= Micronutrient deficiency =

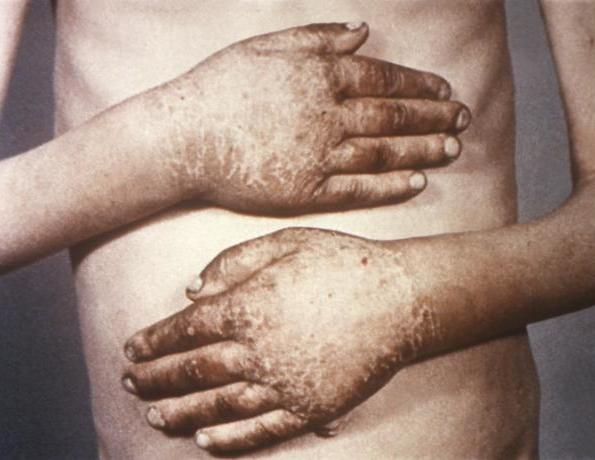
- The skin rash of pellagra, caused by niacin deficiency.

Micronutrient deficiency is defined as the sustained insufficient supply of vitamins and minerals needed for growth and development, as well as to maintain optimal health. Since some of these compounds are considered essentials (we need to obtain them from the diet), micronutrient deficiencies are often the result of an inadequate intake. However, it can also be associated to poor intestinal absorption, presence of certain chronic illnesses and elevated requirements.

== Prevalence ==
Micronutrient deficiencies are considered a public health problem worldwide. For over 30 years it has been estimated that more than two billion people of all ages are affected by this burden, while a recently published study based on individual-level biomarker data estimated that there are 372 million children aged 5 years and younger, and 1.2 billion non-pregnant women of reproductive age with one or more micronutrient deficiencies globally, affecting greatly Asia and sub-Saharan Africa.

Women of reproductive age (including pregnant and lactating) as well as children and adolescents are at higher risk of micronutrient deficiencies due to their higher demands. Similarly, the elderly are among the most vulnerable populations, associated to reduced absorption and utilization, as well as poorer diets. Vegans and people reducing animal-source foods in their diets, as recommended by many scientific studies and experts, are also at greater risk of some micronutrient deficiencies if they don't adequately consume supplements or foods substituting animal-sourced micronutrients.

The most commonly analyzed micronutrient deficiencies, and therefore the most prevalent, include iodine, iron, zinc, calcium, selenium, fluorine, and vitamins A, B_{6}, B_{12}, B_{9} (folate) and D, with large variations between countries and populations.

=== Impact ===
Micronutrient deficiencies are associated to short- and long-term consequences as clinical symptoms and signs will manifest in relation to the body stores for the specific micronutrient and the magnitude of the deficiency. Nonetheless, it has been well established that micronutrient deficiencies are major contributors to impaired growth and neurodevelopment, perinatal complications and increased risk of morbidity and mortality. It has also been associated with 10% of all children's deaths, and are therefore of special concern to those involved with child welfare. Early childhood micronutrient deficiency leads to stunted growth and impaired cognitive development, which in turn can translate into reduced work capacity, productivity and overall well-being during adulthood.

Deficiencies can constrain physical and (neurocognitive) development and compromise health in various ways. Beyond dangerous health conditions, they can also lead to less clinically notable reductions in energy level, mental clarity and overall capacity. They not only affect the cognition of elderly and children but also that of adults. Micronutrients help to resist or to recover from infectious diseases which can have extensive health impacts.

=== Causes ===
Deficiencies of essential vitamins or minerals such as Vitamin A, iron, and zinc may be caused by long-term shortages of nutritious food or by infections such as intestinal worms. They may also be caused or exacerbated when illnesses (such as diarrhoea or malaria) cause rapid loss of nutrients through feces or vomit. Malabsorption can be caused by many diseases of the small intestine, as well as by diseases of the pancreas, liver, biliary tract, and stomach. Anorexia nervosa and impaired digestion all contribute to micronutrient deficiency.

There are several interventions to improve the micronutrient status including fortification of foods, supplementation and treatment of underlying infections. Implementation of appropriate micronutrient interventions has several benefits, including improved cognitive development or enhanced cognition, increased child survival, and reduced prevalence of low birth weight.

=== Links with obesity ===
Some studies have shown a link between micronutrient deficiency and obesity, due to generally cheaper high-calorie low-micronutrient foods and compensation of deficiencies by increased intake.

== Plants ==
In plants a micronutrient deficiency (or trace mineral deficiency) is a physiological plant disorder which occurs when a micronutrient is deficient in the soil in which a plant grows. Micronutrients are distinguished from macronutrients (nitrogen, phosphorus, sulfur, potassium, calcium and magnesium) by the relatively low quantities needed by the plant.

A number of elements are known to be needed in these small amounts for proper plant growth and development. Nutrient deficiencies in these areas can adversely affect plant growth and development. Some of the best known trace mineral deficiencies include: zinc deficiency, boron deficiency, iron deficiency, and manganese deficiency.

=== List of essential trace minerals for plants ===
- Boron is believed to be involved in carbohydrate transport in plants; it also assists in metabolic regulation. Boron deficiency will often result in bud dieback.
- Chlorine is necessary for osmosis and ionic balance; it also plays a role in photosynthesis.
- Copper is a component of some enzymes and of vitamin A. Symptoms of copper deficiency include browning of leaf tips and chlorosis.
- Iron is essential for chlorophyll synthesis, which is why an iron deficiency results in chlorosis.
- Manganese activates some important enzymes involved in chlorophyll formation. Manganese deficient plants will develop chlorosis between the veins of its leaves. The availability of manganese is partially dependent on soil pH.
- Molybdenum is essential to plant health. Molybdenum is used by plants to reduce nitrates into usable forms. Some plants use it for nitrogen fixation, thus it may need to be added to some soils before seeding legumes.
- Nickel is essential for activation of urease, an enzyme involved with nitrogen metabolism that is required to process urea.
- Zinc participates in chlorophyll formation, and also activates many enzymes. Symptoms of zinc deficiency include chlorosis and stunted growth.

== See also ==
- Screening (medicine)
- Blood test
