= Outline of organic gardening and farming =

Overview of and topical guide to organic gardening and farming

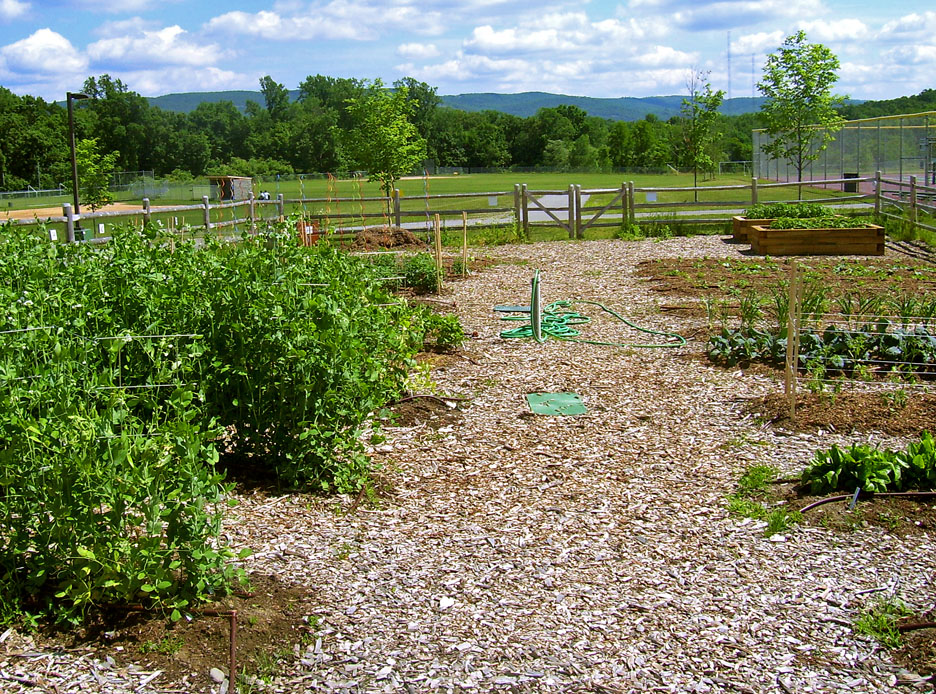
An organic garden on a school campus

The following outline is provided as an overview of and topical guide to organic gardening and farming:

Organic farming – alternative agricultural system that relies on fertilizers of organic origin such as compost, manure, green manure, and bone meal and places emphasis on techniques such as crop rotation and companion planting. Biological pest control, mixed cropping and the fostering of insect predators are encouraged. Organic standards, in general, are intended to enable the use of naturally occurring compounds while restricting or strongly limiting the use of manufactured substances.

== Organic farming and gardening systems and approaches ==
- Biodynamic farming
- Biodynamic gardening
- Climate-friendly gardening
- Forest gardening
- History of organic farming
- Korean natural farming
- Organic farming
- Organic gardening (Organic horticulture)
- Organic lawn management
- Permaculture
- Square foot gardening
- Synergistic gardening
- System of Rice Intensification
- Vegan organic gardening
- Wildlife gardening

=== Principles of organic gardening and farming ===
- Principles of Organic Agriculture
  1. The Principle of Health – "Organic agriculture should sustain and enhance the health of soil, plant, animal and human as one and indivisible."
  2. The Principle of Ecology – "Organic agriculture should be based on living ecological systems and cycles, work with them, emulate them and help sustain them."
  3. The Principle of Fairness – "Organic agriculture should build on relationships that ensure fairness with regard to the common environment and life opportunities."
  4. The Principle of Care – "Organic agriculture should be managed in a precautionary and responsible manner to protect the health and well being of current and future generations and the environment."

=== The ornamental organic garden ===
- List of flowers
- Organic lawn management

== Organic gardening and farming techniques ==
- Aquaponics
- Companion planting

- List of companion plants

- Compost
- Biofertilizer
- Intercropping
- Managed intensive rotational grazing
- Multiple cropping
- No dig gardening
- Pollination management
- Sheet mulching
- Square foot gardening
- Succession planting
- Sustainable agriculture
- Weed control techniques (see also 'weeds' below)

- Stale seed bed

- Xeriscaping (water wise gardening)

- Greywater irrigation

- Neglected crops
- Underutilized crops

== History of organic gardening and farming ==
History of organic farming

== Pests and diseases ==
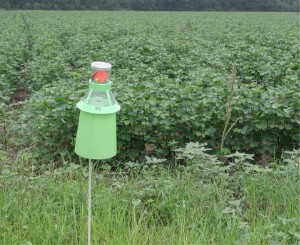
An IPM cotton bollworm trap in a cotton field (Manning, South Carolina): a type of integrated pest management

- Integrated pest management
- Biological pest control
- Physiological plant disorders (i.e., plant disorders caused by environmental factors, such as weather conditions, nutrient deficiencies, etc.)

Nutrient deficiencies

- Boron deficiency
- Calcium deficiency
- Iron deficiency
- Magnesium deficiency
- Manganese deficiency
- Nitrogen deficiency
- Phosphorus deficiency
- Potassium deficiency

- Plant pathology (i.e., plant diseases caused by fungi, viruses, bacteria, etc.)

- Honey fungus
- Rust (fungus)
- Specific replant disease

== Weeds ==
- Indicator plants
- Dynamic accumulator

== Organic organizations ==
- Organic Crop Improvement Association
- Good Gardeners Association (UK)
- Garden Organic, formerly the Henry Doubleday Research Association (main organisation promoting organic gardening in the UK)
- International Federation of Organic Agriculture Movements (IFOAM)
- Permaculture Association (Britain)
- Rodale Institute
- Soil Association (UK)
- Certified Naturally Grown
- Vegan Organic Network
- World-Wide Opportunities on Organic Farms (WWOOF)
- Carolina Farm Stewardship Association For North and South Carolina, of the US, the leading organic farming advocacy and certification institution.
- Biodynamic Farming & Gardening Association
- Irish Organic Farmers and Growers Association (IOFGA) Organic certification and promotion body in Ireland.
- Maine Organic Farmers and Gardeners Association (MOFGA)

== Some important figures in organic farming and gardening ==
- Lady Eve Balfour
- Louis Bromfield
- Peter Caddy
- Alan Chadwick
- Charles III
- Jim Cochran
- Eliot Coleman
- Dr Shewell Cooper
- Bob Flowerdew
- Masanobu Fukuoka
- Howard Garrett
- Geoff Hamilton
- Robert Hart
- Emilia Hazelip
- Lawrence D Hills
- David Holmgren
- Sir Albert Howard
- Dan Jason
- Bill Mollison
- Helen and Scott Nearing
- Michelle Obama
- Airi Ōtsu, Japanese organic farmer
- Prince Philip
- J. I. Rodale
- Viktor Schauberger
- Ruth Stout

== See also ==
- Aquaponics
- Botany
- Community-supported agriculture
- Farmers' markets
- List of countries with organic agriculture regulation
- List of organic food topics
- Local food
- Organic certification
- Organic cotton
- Organic food
- Organic horticulture
- Organic movement
- Orthodox seed
- Recalcitrant seed
- Terra preta
- Wildcrafting

Related lists

- List of environment topics
- List of ethics topics
- List of sustainable agriculture topics
- Urban economics
