= Physiological plant disorder =

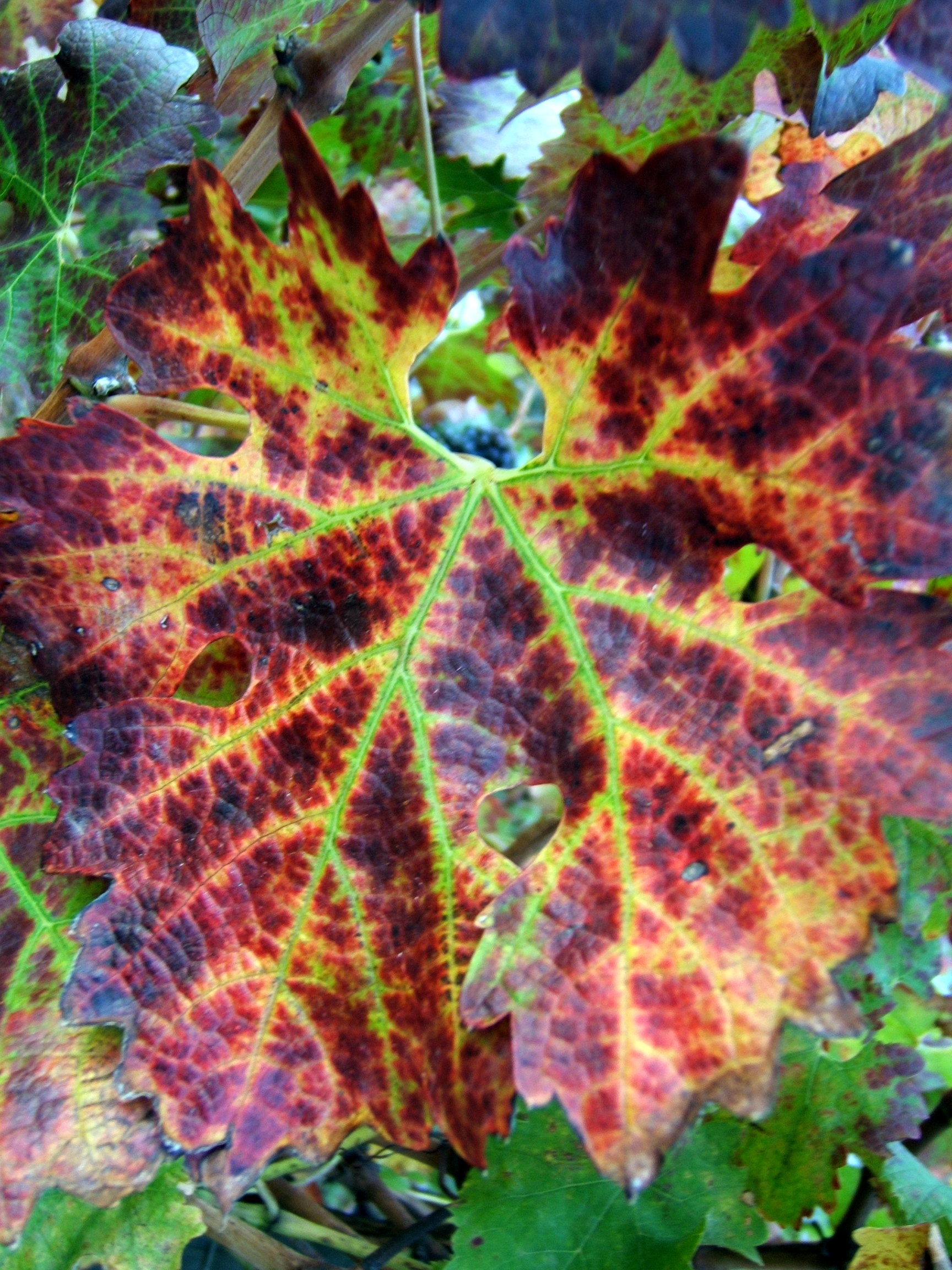
Deficit of micronutrients, vine.

Physiological plant disorders are caused by non-pathological conditions such as poor light, adverse weather, water-logging, phytotoxic compounds or a lack of nutrients, and affect the functioning of the plant system. Physiological disorders are distinguished from plant diseases caused by pathogens, such as a virus or fungus. While the symptoms of physiological disorders may appear disease-like, they can usually be prevented by altering environmental conditions. However, once a plant shows symptoms of a physiological disorder, it is likely that that season's growth or yield will be reduced.

== Diagnosis of disorders ==
Diagnosis of the cause of a physiological disorder (or disease) can be difficult, but there are many web-based guides that may assist with this. Examples are: Abiotic plant disorders: Symptoms, signs and solutions; Georgia Corn Diagnostic Guide; Diagnosing Plant Problems (Kentucky); and Diagnosing Plant Problems (Virginia).

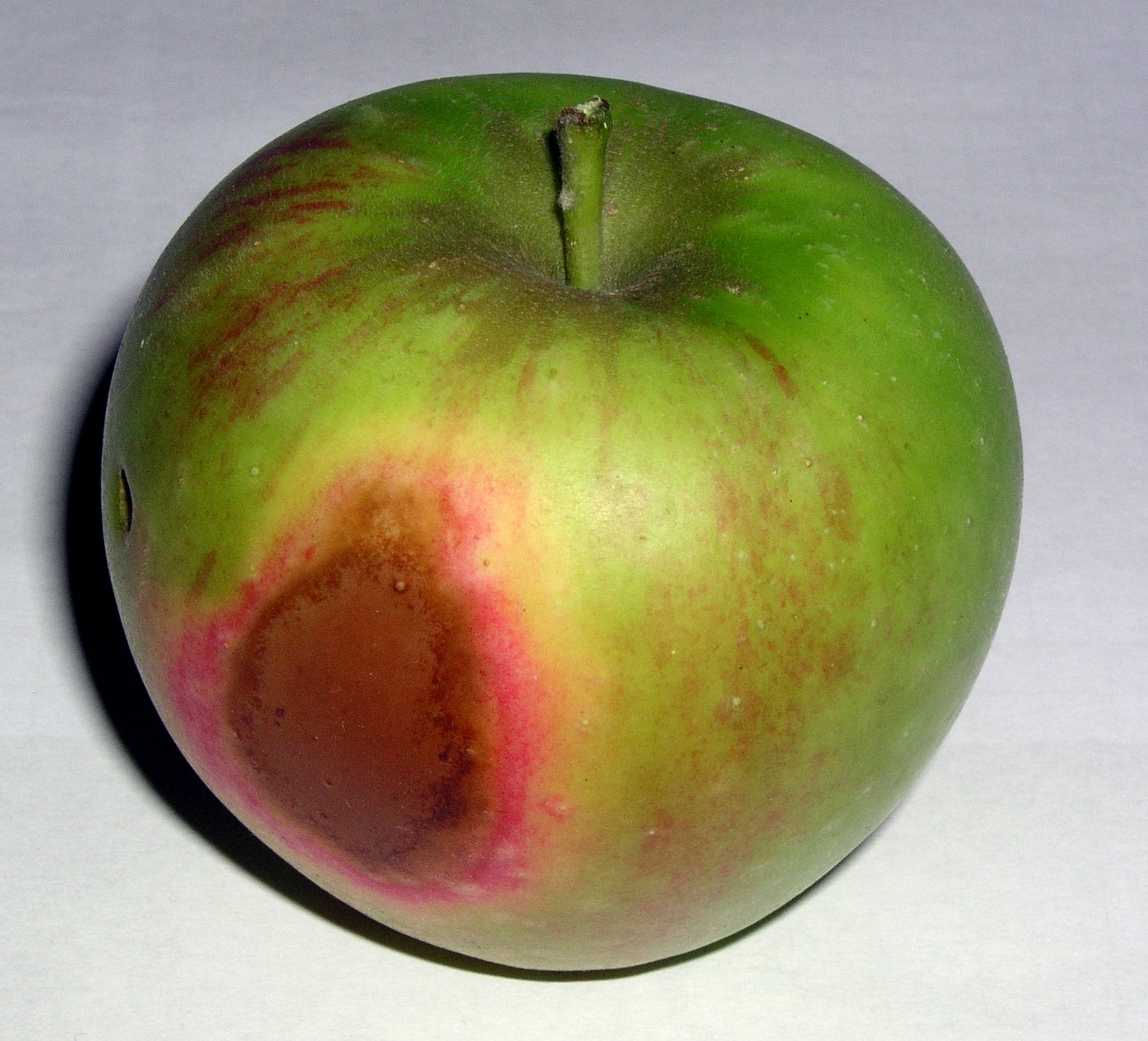
Sunburn on apple.

Some general tips to diagnosing plant disorders:

- Examine where symptoms first appear on a plant—on new leaves, old leaves or all over?
- Note the pattern of any discolouration or yellowing—is it all over, between the veins or around the edges? If only the veins are yellow, deficiency is probably not involved.
- Note general patterns rather than looking at individual plants—are the symptoms distributed throughout a group of plants of the same type growing together? In the case of a deficiency all of the plants should be similarly effected, although distribution will depend on past treatments applied to the soil.
- Soil analysis, such as determining pH, can help to confirm the presence of physiological disorders.
- Considering recent conditions, such as heavy rains, dry spells, frosts, etc., may also help to determine the cause of plant disorders.

== Weather damage ==
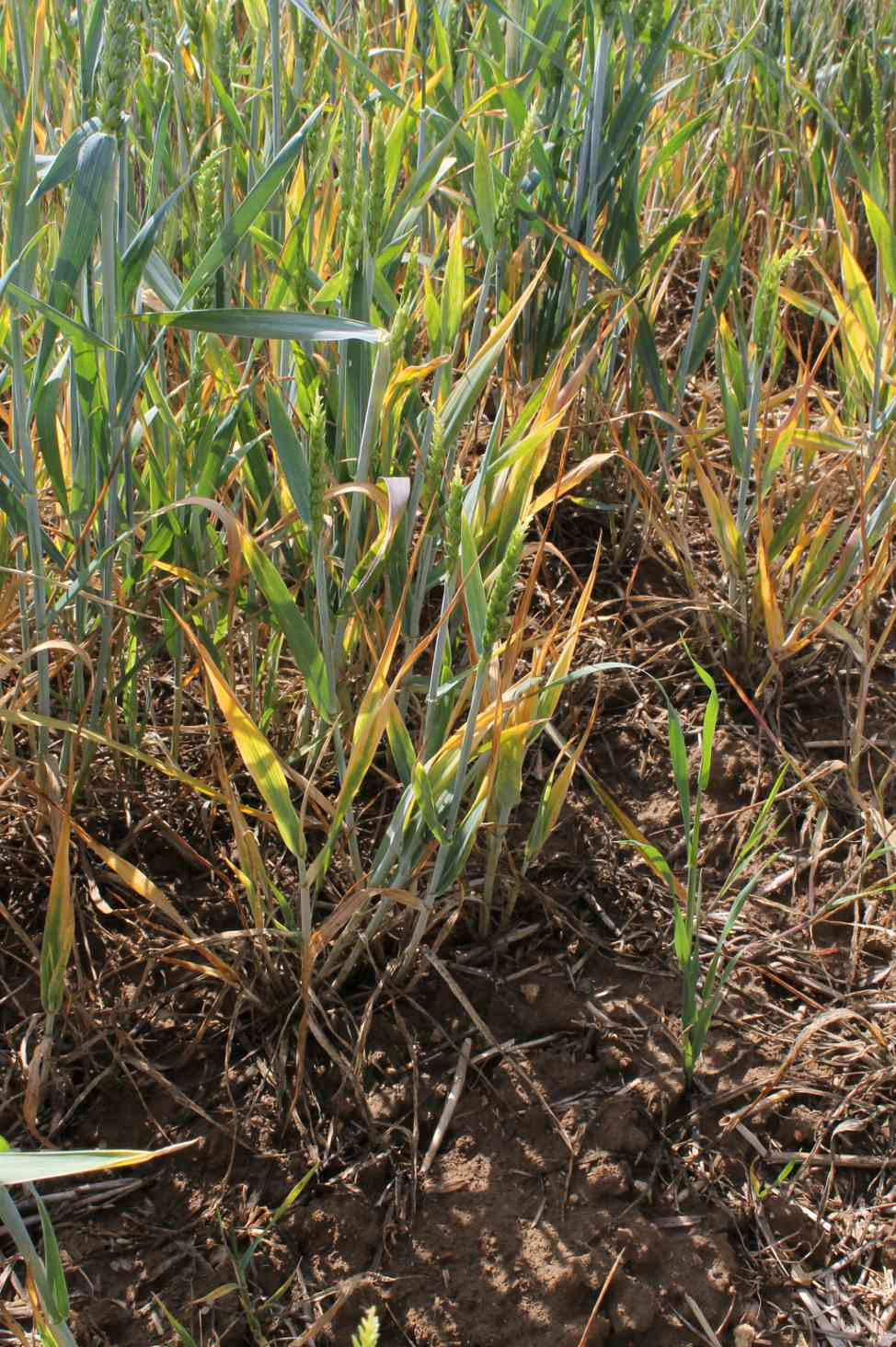
Drought.

Frost and cold are major causes of crop damage to tender plants, although hardy plants can also suffer if new growth is exposed to a hard frost following a period of warm weather. Symptoms will often appear overnight, affecting many types of plants. Leaves and stems may turn black, and buds and flowers may be discoloured, and frosted blooms may not produce fruit. Many annual plants, or plants grown in frost free areas, can suffer from damage when the air temperature drops below 40 degrees Fahrenheit (4 degrees Celsius). Tropical plants may begin to experience cold damage when the temperature is 42 to 48 °F (6 to 9 °C), symptoms include wilting of the top of the stems and/or leaves, and blackening or softening of the plant tissue.

Frost or cold damage can be avoided by ensuring that tender plants are properly hardened before planting, and that they are not planted too early in the season, before the risk of frost has passed. Avoid planting susceptible plants in frost pockets, or where they will receive early morning sun. Protect young buds and bloom with horticultural fleece if frost is forecast. Cold, drying easterly winds can also severely inhibit spring growth even without an actual frost, thus adequate shelter or the use of windbreaks is important.

Drought can cause plants to suffer from water stress and wilt. Adequate irrigation is required during prolonged hot, dry periods. Rather than shallow daily watering, during a drought water should be directed towards the roots, ensuring that the soil is thoroughly soaked two or three times a week. Mulches also help preserve soil moisture and keep roots cool.

Heavy rains, particularly after prolonged dry periods, can also cause roots to split, onion saddleback (splitting at the base), tomatoes split and potatoes to become deformed or hollow. Using mulches or adding organic matter such as leaf mold, compost or well rotted manure to the soil will help to act as a 'buffer' between sudden changes in conditions. Water-logging can occur on poorly drained soils, particularly following heavy rains. Plants can become yellow and stunted, and will tend to be more prone to drought and diseases. Improving drainage will help to alleviate this problem.

Hail can cause damage to soft skinned fruits, and may also allow brown rot or other fungi to penetrate the plant. Brown spot markings or lines on one side of a mature apple are indicative of a spring hailstorm.

Plants affected by salt stress are able to take water from soil, due to an osmotic imbalance between soil and plant.

== Nutrient deficiencies ==
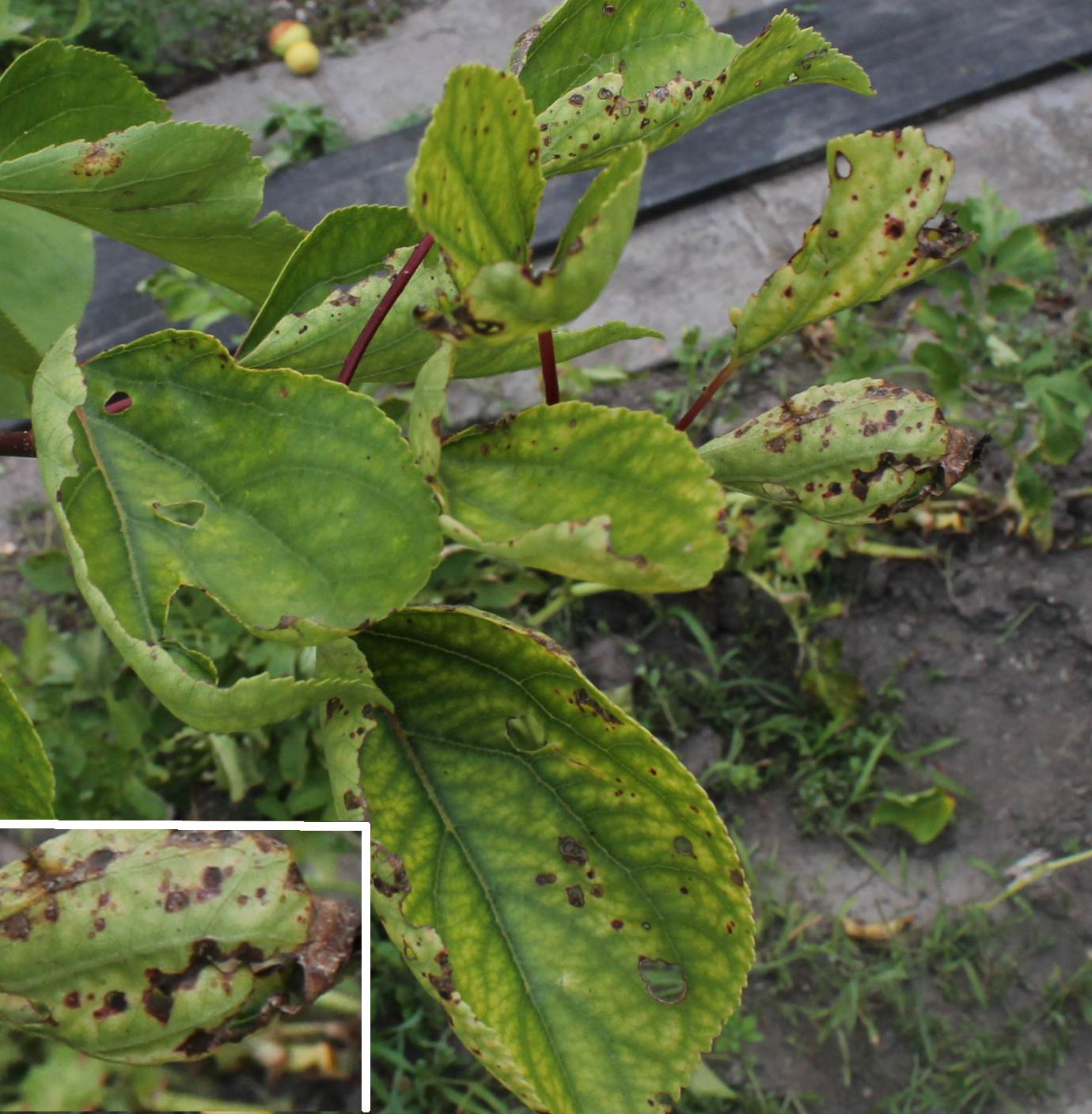
Iron deficiency.

Poor growth and a variety of disorders such as leaf discolouration (chlorosis) can be caused by a shortage of one or more plant nutrients. Poor plant uptake of a nutrient from the soil (or other growing medium) may be due to an absolute shortage of that element in the growing medium, or because that element is present in a form that is not available to the plant. The latter can be caused by incorrect pH, shortage of water, poor root growth or an excess of another nutrient. Plant nutrient deficiencies can be avoided or corrected using a variety of approaches including the consultation of experts on-site, the use of soil and plant-tissue testing services, the application of prescription-blend fertilizers, the application of fresh or well-decomposed organic matter, and the use of biological systems such as cover crops, intercropping, improved fallows, ley cropping, permaculture, or crop rotation.

Nutrient (or mineral) deficiencies include:

- Boron deficiency
- Calcium deficiency
- Iron deficiency
- Magnesium deficiency
- Manganese deficiency
- Molybdenum deficiency
- Nitrogen deficiency
- Phosphorus deficiency
- Potassium deficiency
- Zinc deficiency
