= Plant nutrition =

Study of the chemical elements and compounds necessary for normal plant life

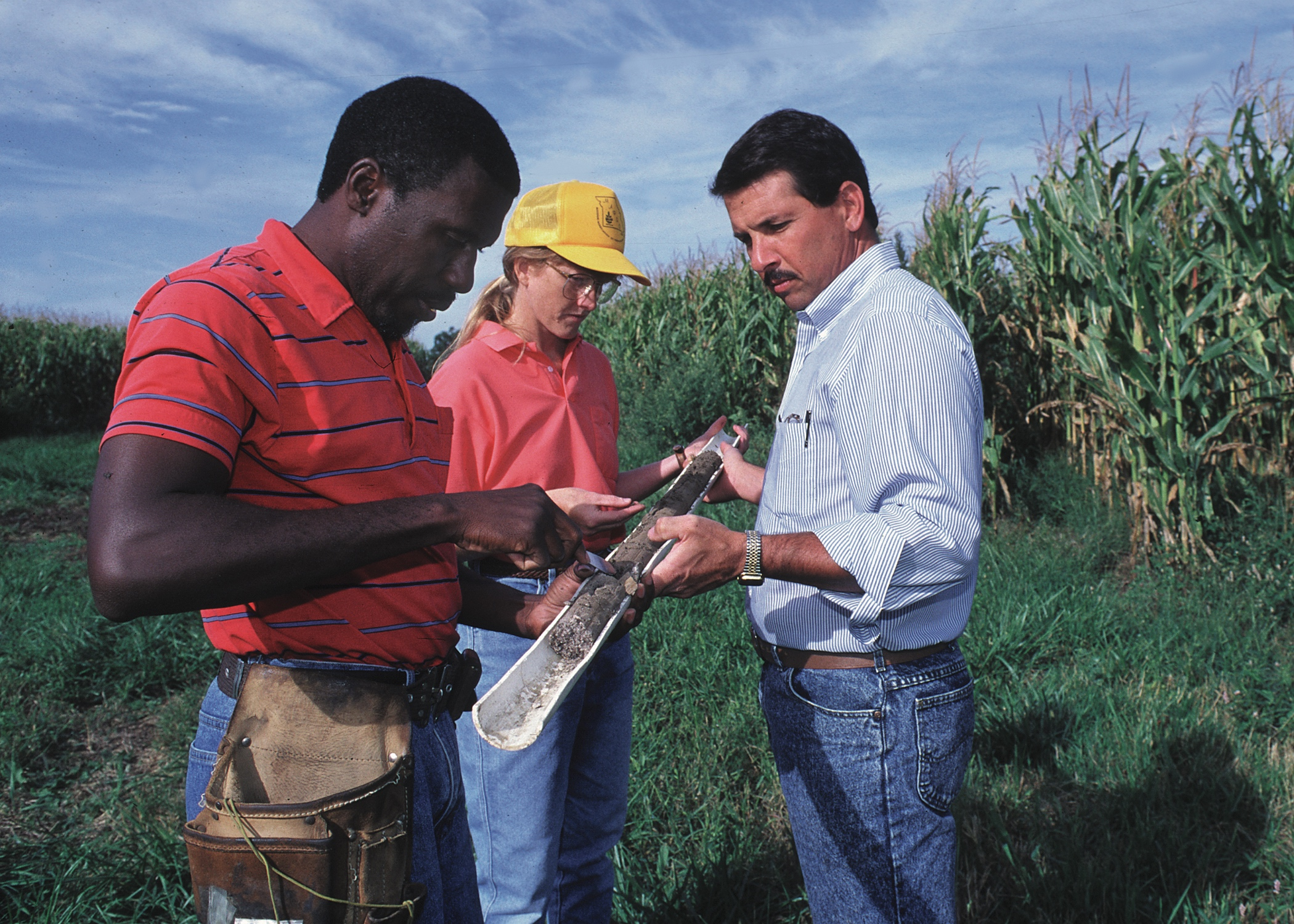
Three soil scientists examining a farm land sample

Plant nutrition is the study of the chemical elements and compounds necessary for plant growth and reproduction, plant metabolism and their external supply. In its absence the plant is unable to complete a normal life cycle, or that the element is part of some essential plant constituent or metabolite. This is in accordance with Justus von Liebig's law of the minimum. The total essential plant nutrients include seventeen different elements: carbon, oxygen and hydrogen which are absorbed from the air and water, whereas other nutrients including nitrogen are typically obtained from the soil (exceptions include some parasitic or carnivorous plants).

Plants must obtain the following mineral nutrients from their growing medium:

- The macronutrients: nitrogen (N), phosphorus (P), potassium (K), sulfur (S), calcium (Ca), magnesium (Mg), carbon (C), hydrogen (H), oxygen (O)
- The micronutrients (or trace minerals): iron (Fe), boron (B), chlorine (Cl), manganese (Mn), zinc (Zn), copper (Cu), molybdenum (Mo), nickel (Ni)

These elements stay beneath soil as salts, so plants absorb these elements as ions. The macronutrients are taken up in larger quantities; hydrogen, oxygen, nitrogen and carbon contribute to over 95% of a plant's entire biomass on a dry matter weight basis. Micronutrients are present in plant tissue in quantities measured in parts per million, ranging from 0.1 to 200 ppm, or less than 0.02% dry weight.

Most soil conditions across the world can provide plants adapted to that climate and soil with sufficient nutrition for a complete life cycle, without the addition of nutrients as fertilizer. However, if the soil is cropped it is necessary to artificially modify soil fertility through the addition of fertilizer to promote vigorous growth and increase or sustain yield. This is done because, even with adequate water and light, nutrient deficiency can limit growth and crop yield.

== History ==
That plants absorb nutrients from their environment, including water from the soil, and distribute water and other nutrients throughout their tissues must have been understood since prehistoric times. Aristotle and later investigators were faced with questions about what these nutrients were and how they were absorbed and transported within plants—questions whose answers were less obvious.

=== Required elements ===
Carbon, hydrogen and oxygen are the basic nutrients plants receive from air and water. Justus von Liebig proved in 1840 that plants needed nitrogen, potassium and phosphorus. Liebig's law of the minimum states that a plant's growth is limited by nutrient deficiency. Plant cultivation in media other than soil was used by Arnon and Stout in 1939 to show that molybdenum was essential to tomato growth.

== Processes ==
Plants take up essential elements from the soil through their roots and from the air through their leaves. Nutrient uptake in the soil is achieved by cation exchange, wherein root hairs pump hydrogen ions (H^{+}) into the soil through proton pumps. These hydrogen ions displace cations attached to negatively charged soil particles so that the cations are available for uptake by the root. In the leaves, stomata open to take in carbon dioxide and expel oxygen. The carbon dioxide molecules are used as the carbon source in photosynthesis.

The root, especially the root hair, a unique cell, is the essential organ for the uptake of nutrients. The structure and architecture of the root can alter the rate of nutrient uptake. Nutrient ions are transported to the center of the root, the stele, in order for the nutrients to reach the conducting tissues, xylem and phloem. The Casparian strip, a cell wall outside the stele but in the root, prevents passive flow of water and nutrients, helping to regulate the uptake of nutrients and water. Xylem moves water and mineral ions in the plant and phloem accounts for organic molecule transportation. Water potential plays a key role in a plant's nutrient uptake. If the water potential is more negative in the plant than the surrounding soils, the nutrients will move from the region of higher solute concentration—in the soil—to the area of lower solute concentration - in the plant.

There are three fundamental ways plants uptake nutrients through the root:

1. Simple diffusion occurs when a nonpolar molecule, such as O_{2}, CO_{2}, and NH_{3} follows a concentration gradient, moving passively through the cell lipid bilayer membrane without the use of transport proteins.
2. Facilitated diffusion is the rapid movement of solutes or ions following a concentration gradient, facilitated by transport proteins.
3. Active transport is the uptake by cells of ions or molecules against a concentration gradient; this requires an energy source, usually ATP, to power molecular pumps that move the ions or molecules through the membrane.

Nutrients can be moved in plants to where they are most needed. For example, a plant will try to supply more nutrients to its younger leaves than to its older ones. When nutrients are mobile in the plant, symptoms of any deficiency become apparent first on the older leaves. However, not all nutrients are equally mobile. Nitrogen, phosphorus, and potassium are mobile nutrients while the others have varying degrees of mobility. When a less-mobile nutrient is deficient, the younger leaves suffer because the nutrient does not move up to them but stays in the older leaves. This phenomenon is helpful in determining which nutrients a plant may be lacking.

Many plants engage in symbiosis with microorganisms. Two important types of these relationship are

1. with bacteria such as rhizobia, that carry out biological nitrogen fixation, in which atmospheric nitrogen (N_{2}) is converted into ammonium (NH^{+}_{4}); and
2. with mycorrhizal fungi, which through their association with the plant roots help to create a larger effective root surface area. Both of these mutualistic relationships enhance nutrient uptake.

The Earth's atmosphere contains over 78 percent nitrogen. Plants called legumes, including the agricultural crops alfalfa and soybeans, widely grown by farmers, harbour nitrogen-fixing bacteria that can convert atmospheric nitrogen into nitrogen the plant can use. Plants not classified as legumes such as wheat, corn and rice rely on nitrogen compounds present in the soil to support their growth. These can be supplied by mineralization of soil organic matter or added plant residues, nitrogen fixing bacteria, animal waste, through the breaking of triple bonded N_{2} molecules by lightning strikes or through the application of fertilizers.

== Functions of nutrients ==
At least 17 elements are known to be essential nutrients for plants. In relatively large amounts, the soil supplies nitrogen, phosphorus, potassium, calcium, magnesium, and sulfur; these are often called the macronutrients. In relatively small amounts, the soil supplies iron, manganese, boron, molybdenum, copper, zinc, chlorine, and cobalt, the so-called micronutrients. Nutrients must be available not only in sufficient amounts but also in appropriate ratios.

Plant nutrition is a difficult subject to understand completely, partially because of the variation between different plants and even between different species or individuals of a given clone. Elements present at low levels may cause deficiency symptoms, and toxicity is possible at levels that are too high. Furthermore, deficiency of one element may present as symptoms of toxicity from another element, and vice versa. An abundance of one nutrient may cause a deficiency of another nutrient. For example, K^{+} uptake can be influenced by the amount of NH^{+}_{4} available.

Nitrogen is plentiful in the Earth's atmosphere, and a number of commercially-important agricultural plants engage in nitrogen fixation (conversion of atmospheric nitrogen to a biologically useful form). However, plants mostly receive their nitrogen through the soil, where it is already converted in biological useful form. This is important because the nitrogen in the atmosphere is too large for the plant to consume, and takes a lot of energy to convert into smaller forms. These include soybeans, edible beans and peas as well as clovers and alfalfa used primarily for feeding livestock. Plants such as the commercially-important corn, wheat, oats, barley and rice require nitrogen compounds to be present in the soil in which they grow.

Carbon and oxygen are absorbed from the air while other nutrients are absorbed from the soil. Green plants ordinarily obtain their carbohydrate supply from the carbon dioxide in the air by the process of photosynthesis. Each of these nutrients is used for a different essential function.

=== Basic nutrients ===
The basic nutrients are derived from air and water.

==== Carbon ====
Carbon forms the backbone of most plant biomolecules, including proteins, starches and cellulose. Carbon is fixed through photosynthesis; this converts carbon dioxide from the air into carbohydrates which are used to store and transport energy within the plant.

==== Hydrogen ====
Hydrogen is necessary for building sugars and building the plant. It is obtained almost entirely from water. Hydrogen ions are imperative for a proton gradient to help drive the electron transport chain in photosynthesis and for respiration.

==== Oxygen ====
Oxygen is a component of many organic and inorganic molecules within the plant, and is acquired in many forms. These include: O_{2} and CO_{2} (mainly from the air via leaves) and H_{2}O, NO^{−}_{3}, H_{2}PO^{−}_{4} and SO^{2−}_{4} (mainly from the soil water via roots). Plants produce oxygen gas (O_{2}) along with glucose during photosynthesis but then require O_{2} to undergo aerobic cellular respiration and break down this glucose to produce ATP.

=== Macronutrients (primary) ===
==== Nitrogen ====
Nitrogen is a major constituent of several of the most important plant substances. For example, nitrogen compounds comprise 40% to 50% of the dry matter of protoplasm, and it is a constituent of amino acids, the building blocks of proteins. It is also an essential constituent of chlorophyll. In many agricultural settings, nitrogen is the limiting nutrient for rapid growth.

==== Phosphorus ====
Like nitrogen, phosphorus is involved with many vital plant processes. Within a plant, it is present mainly as a structural component of the nucleic acids: deoxyribonucleic acid (DNA) and ribonucleic acid (RNA), as well as a constituent of fatty phospholipids, that are important in membrane development and function. It is present in both organic and inorganic forms, both of which are readily translocated within the plant. All energy transfers in the cell are critically dependent on phosphorus. As with all living things, phosphorus is part of the Adenosine triphosphate (ATP), which is of immediate use in all processes that require energy with the cells. Phosphorus can also be used to modify the activity of various enzymes by phosphorylation, and is used for cell signaling. Phosphorus is concentrated at the most actively growing points of a plant and stored within seeds in anticipation of their germination.

==== Potassium ====
Unlike other major elements, potassium does not enter into the composition of any of the important plant constituents involved in metabolism, but it does occur in all parts of plants in substantial amounts. It is essential for enzyme activity including enzymes involved in primary metabolism. It plays a role in turgor regulation, effecting the functioning of the stomata and cell volume growth.

It seems to be of particular importance in leaves and at growing points. Potassium is outstanding among the nutrient elements for its mobility and solubility within plant tissues.

Processes involving potassium include the formation of carbohydrates and proteins, the regulation of internal plant moisture, as a catalyst and condensing agent of complex substances, as an accelerator of enzyme action, and as contributor to photosynthesis, especially under low light intensity. Potassium regulates the opening and closing of the stomata by a potassium ion pump. Since stomata are important in water regulation, potassium regulates water loss from the leaves and increases drought tolerance. Potassium serves as an activator of enzymes used in photosynthesis and respiration. Potassium is used to build cellulose and aids in photosynthesis by the formation of a chlorophyll precursor. The potassium ion (K^{+}) is highly mobile and can aid in balancing the anion (negative) charges within the plant. A relationship between potassium nutrition and cold resistance has been found in several tree species, including two species of spruce. Potassium helps in fruit coloration, shape and also increases its brix. Hence, quality fruits are produced in potassium-rich soils.

Research has linked K^{+} transport with auxin homeostasis, cell signaling, cell expansion, membrane trafficking and phloem transport.

=== Macronutrients (secondary and tertiary) ===
==== Sulfur ====
Sulfur is a structural component of some amino acids (including cysteine and methionine) and vitamins, and is essential for chloroplast growth and function; it is found in the iron-sulfur complexes of the electron transport chains in photosynthesis. It is needed for N_{2} fixation by legumes, and the conversion of nitrate into amino acids and then into protein.

==== Calcium ====
Calcium in plants occurs chiefly in the leaves, with lower concentrations in seeds, fruits, and roots. A major function is as a constituent of cell walls. When coupled with certain acidic compounds of the jelly-like pectins of the middle lamella, calcium forms an insoluble salt. It is also intimately involved in meristems, and is particularly important in root development, with roles in cell division, cell elongation, and the detoxification of hydrogen ions. Other functions attributed to calcium are: the neutralization of organic acids; inhibition of some potassium-activated ions; and a role in nitrogen absorption. A notable feature of calcium-deficient plants is a defective root system. Roots are usually affected before above-ground parts. Blossom end rot is also a result of inadequate calcium.

Calcium regulates transport of other nutrients into the plant and is also involved in the activation of certain plant enzymes. Calcium deficiency results in stunting. This nutrient is involved in photosynthesis and plant structure. It is needed as a balancing cation for anions in the vacuole and as an intracellular messenger in the cytosol.

==== Magnesium ====
The outstanding role of magnesium in plant nutrition is as a constituent of the chlorophyll molecule. As a carrier, it is also involved in numerous enzyme reactions as an effective activator, in which it is closely associated with energy-supplying phosphorus compounds.

=== Micro-nutrients ===
Plants are able sufficiently to accumulate most trace elements. Some plants are sensitive indicators of the chemical environment in which they grow (Dunn 1991), and some plants have barrier mechanisms that exclude or limit the uptake of a particular element or ion species, e.g., alder twigs commonly accumulate molybdenum but not arsenic, whereas the reverse is true of spruce bark (Dunn 1991). Otherwise, a plant can integrate the geochemical signature of the soil mass permeated by its root system together with the contained groundwaters. Sampling is facilitated by the tendency of many elements to accumulate in tissues at the plant's extremities. Some micronutrients can be applied as seed coatings.

==== Iron ====
Iron is necessary for photosynthesis and is present as an enzyme cofactor in plants. Iron deficiency can result in interveinal chlorosis and necrosis. Iron is not a structural part of chlorophyll but very much essential for its synthesis. Copper deficiency can be responsible for promoting an iron deficiency. It helps in the electron transport of plant.

As with other biological processes, the main useful form of iron is that of iron(II) due to its higher solubility in neutral pH. However, plants are also capable of using iron(III) via citric acid, using the photo-reduction of ferric citrate. In the field, as with many other transitional metal elements, iron fertilizer is supplied as a chelate.

==== Molybdenum ====
Molybdenum is a cofactor for enzymes important in building amino acids and is involved in nitrogen metabolism. Molybdenum is part of the nitrate reductase enzyme (needed for the reduction of nitrate) and the nitrogenase enzyme (required for biological nitrogen fixation). Reduced productivity as a result of molybdenum deficiency is usually associated with the reduced activity of one or more of these enzymes.

==== Boron ====
Boron has many functions in a plant: it affects flowering and fruiting, pollen germination, cell division, and active salt absorption. The metabolism of amino acids and proteins, carbohydrates, calcium, and water are strongly affected by boron. Many of those listed functions may be embodied by its function in moving the highly polar sugars through cell membranes by reducing their polarity and hence the energy needed to pass the sugar. If sugar cannot pass to the fastest growing parts rapidly enough, those parts die.

==== Copper ====
Copper is important for photosynthesis. Symptoms for copper deficiency include chlorosis. It is involved in many enzyme processes; necessary for proper photosynthesis; involved in the manufacture of lignin (cell walls) and involved in grain production. It is difficult to find in some soil conditions.

==== Manganese ====
Manganese is necessary for photosynthesis, including the building of chloroplasts. Manganese deficiency may result in coloration abnormalities, such as discolored spots on the foliage.

==== Sodium ====
Sodium is involved in the regeneration of phosphoenolpyruvate in CAM and C4 plants. Sodium can potentially replace potassium's regulation of stomatal opening and closing.

Essentiality of sodium:

- Essential for C4 plants rather C3
- Substitution of K by Na: Plants can be classified into four groups:
1. Group A—a high proportion of K can be replaced by Na and stimulate the growth, which cannot be achieved by the application of K
2. Group B—specific growth responses to Na are observed but they are much less distinct
3. Group C—Only minor substitution is possible and Na has no effect
4. Group D—No substitution occurs
- Stimulate the growth—increase leaf area and stomata. Improves the water balance
- Na functions in metabolism
1. C4 metabolism
2. Impair the conversion of pyruvate to phosphoenol-pyruvate
3. Reduce the photosystem II activity and ultrastructural changes in mesophyll chloroplast
- Replacing K functions
1. Internal osmoticum
2. Stomatal function
3. Photosynthesis
4. Counteraction in long distance transport
5. Enzyme activation
- Improves the crop quality e.g. improves the taste of carrots by increasing sucrose

==== Zinc ====
Zinc is required in a large number of enzymes and plays an essential role in DNA transcription. A typical symptom of zinc deficiency is the stunted growth of leaves, commonly known as "little leaf" and is caused by the oxidative degradation of the growth hormone auxin.

==== Nickel ====
In vascular plants, nickel is absorbed by plants in the form of Ni^{2+} ion. Nickel is essential for activation of urease, an enzyme involved with nitrogen metabolism that is required to process urea. Without nickel, toxic levels of urea accumulate, leading to the formation of necrotic lesions. In non-vascular plants, nickel activates several enzymes involved in a variety of processes, and can substitute for zinc and iron as a cofactor in some enzymes.

==== Chlorine ====
Chlorine, as compounded chloride, is necessary for osmosis and ionic balance; it also plays a role in photosynthesis.

==== Cobalt ====
Cobalt has proven to be beneficial to at least some plants although it does not appear to be essential for most species. It has, however, been shown to be essential for nitrogen fixation by the nitrogen-fixing bacteria associated with legumes and other plants.

==== Silicon ====
Silicon is not considered an essential element for plant growth and development. It is always found in abundance in the environment and hence if needed it is available. It is found in the structures of plants and improves the health of plants.

In plants, silicon has been shown in experiments to strengthen cell walls, improve plant strength, health, and productivity. There have been studies showing evidence of silicon improving drought and frost resistance, decreasing lodging potential and boosting the plant's natural pest and disease fighting systems. Silicon has also been shown to improve plant vigor and physiology by improving root mass and density, and increasing above ground plant biomass and crop yields. Silicon is currently under consideration by the Association of American Plant Food Control Officials (AAPFCO) for elevation to the status of a "plant beneficial substance".

==== Vanadium ====
Vanadium may be required by some plants, but at very low concentrations. It may also be substituting for molybdenum.

==== Selenium ====
Selenium is probably not essential for flowering plants, but it can be beneficial; it can stimulate plant growth, improve tolerance of oxidative stress, and increase resistance to pathogens and herbivory.

== Mobility ==
=== Mobile ===
Nitrogen is transported via the xylem from the roots to the leaf canopy as nitrate ions, or in an organic form, such as amino acids or amides. Nitrogen can also be transported in the phloem sap as amides, amino acids and ureides; it is therefore mobile within the plant, and the older leaves exhibit chlorosis and necrosis earlier than the younger leaves. Because phosphorus is a mobile nutrient, older leaves will show the first signs of deficiency. Magnesium is very mobile in plants, and, like potassium, when deficient is translocated from older to younger tissues, so that signs of deficiency appear first on the oldest tissues and then spread progressively to younger tissues.

=== Immobile ===
Because calcium is phloem immobile, calcium deficiency can be seen in new growth. When developing tissues are forced to rely on the xylem, calcium is supplied by transpiration only.

Boron is not relocatable in the plant via the phloem. It must be supplied to the growing parts via the xylem. Foliar sprays affect only those parts sprayed, which may be insufficient for the fastest growing parts, and is very temporary.

In plants, sulfur cannot be mobilized from older leaves for new growth, so deficiency symptoms are seen in the youngest tissues first. Symptoms of deficiency include yellowing of leaves and stunted growth.

== Nutrient deficiency ==
=== Symptoms ===
The effect of a nutrient deficiency can vary from a subtle depression of growth rate to obvious stunting, deformity, discoloration, distress, and even death. Visual symptoms distinctive enough to be useful in identifying a deficiency are rare. Most deficiencies are multiple and moderate. However, while a deficiency is seldom that of a single nutrient, nitrogen is commonly the nutrient in shortest supply.

Chlorosis of foliage is not always due to mineral nutrient deficiency. Solarization can produce superficially similar effects, though mineral deficiency tends to cause premature defoliation, whereas solarization does not, nor does solarization depress nitrogen concentration.

=== Macronutrients ===
Nitrogen deficiency most often results in stunted growth, slow growth, and chlorosis. Nitrogen deficient plants will also exhibit a purple appearance on the stems, petioles and underside of leaves from an accumulation of anthocyanin pigments.

Phosphorus deficiency can produce symptoms similar to those of nitrogen deficiency, characterized by an intense green coloration or reddening in leaves due to lack of chlorophyll. If the plant is experiencing high phosphorus deficiencies the leaves may become denatured and show signs of death. Occasionally the leaves may appear purple from an accumulation of anthocyanin. As noted by Russel: "Phosphate deficiency differs from nitrogen deficiency in being extremely difficult to diagnose, and crops can be suffering from extreme starvation without there being any obvious signs that lack of phosphate is the cause". Russell's observation applies to at least some coniferous seedlings, but Benzian found that although response to phosphorus in very acid forest tree nurseries in England was consistently high, no species (including Sitka spruce) showed any visible symptom of deficiency other than a slight lack of lustre. Phosphorus levels have to be exceedingly low before visible symptoms appear in such seedlings. In sand culture at 0 ppm phosphorus, white spruce seedlings were very small and tinted deep purple; at 0.62 ppm, only the smallest seedlings were deep purple; at 6.2 ppm, the seedlings were of good size and color.

The root system is less effective without a continuous supply of calcium to newly developing cells. Even short term disruptions in calcium supply can disrupt biological functions and root function. A common symptom of calcium deficiency in leaves is the curling of the leaf towards the veins or center of the leaf. Many times this can also have a blackened appearance. The tips of the leaves may appear burned and cracking may occur in some calcium deficient crops if they experience a sudden increase in humidity. Calcium deficiency may arise in tissues that are fed by the phloem, causing blossom end rot in watermelons, peppers and tomatoes, empty peanut pods and bitter pits in apples. In enclosed tissues, calcium deficiency can cause celery black heart and "brown heart" in greens like escarole.

Researchers found that partial deficiencies of K or P did not change the fatty acid composition of phosphatidyl choline in Brassica napus L. plants. Calcium deficiency did, on the other hand, lead to a marked decline of polyunsaturated compounds that would be expected to have negative impacts for integrity of the plant membrane, that could effect some properties like its permeability, and is needed for the ion uptake activity of the root membranes.

Potassium deficiency may cause necrosis or interveinal chlorosis. Deficiency may result in higher risk of pathogens, wilting, chlorosis, brown spotting, and higher chances of damage from frost and heat. When potassium is moderately deficient, the effects first appear in the older tissues, and from there progress towards the growing points. Acute deficiency severely affects growing points, and die-back commonly occurs. Symptoms of potassium deficiency in white spruce include: browning and death of needles (chlorosis); reduced growth in height and diameter; impaired retention of needles; and reduced needle length.

=== Micronutrients ===
Mo deficiency is usually found on older growth. Fe, Mn and Cu effect new growth, causing green or yellow veins, Zn can effect old and new leaves, and B will be seem on terminal buds. A plant with zinc deficiency may have leaves on top of each other due to reduced internodal expansion.

Zinc is the most widely deficient micronutrient for industrial crop cultivation, followed by boron. Acidifying N fertilizers create micro-sites around the granule that keep micronutrient cations soluble for longer in alkaline soils, but high concentrations of P or C may negate these effects.

Boron deficiencies effecting seed yields and pollen fertility are common in laterite soils. Boron is essential for the proper forming and strengthening of cell walls. Lack of boron results in short thick cells producing stunted fruiting bodies and roots. Deficiency results in the death of the terminal growing points and stunted growth. Inadequate amounts of boron affect many agricultural crops, legume forage crops most strongly. Boron deficiencies can be detected by analysis of plant material to apply a correction before the obvious symptoms appear, after which it is too late to prevent crop loss. Strawberries deficient in boron will produce lumpy fruit; apricots will not blossom or, if they do, will not fruit or will drop their fruit depending on the level of boron deficit. Broadcast of boron supplements is effective and long term; a foliar spray is immediate but must be repeated.

== Toxicity ==
Boron concentration in soil water solution higher than one ppm is toxic to most plants. Toxic concentrations within plants are 10 to 50 ppm for small grains and 200 ppm in boron-tolerant crops such as sugar beets, rutabaga, cucumbers, and conifers. Toxic soil conditions are generally limited to arid regions or can be caused by underground borax deposits in contact with water or volcanic gases dissolved in percolating water.

== Availability and uptake ==
=== Nitrogen fixation ===
There is an abundant supply of nitrogen in the earth's atmosphere—N_{2} gas comprises nearly 79% of air. However, N_{2} is unavailable for use by most organisms because there is a triple bond between the two nitrogen atoms in the molecule, making it almost inert. In order for nitrogen to be used for growth it must be "fixed" (combined) in the form of ammonium (NH^{+}_{4}) or nitrate (NO^{−}_{3}) ions. The weathering of rocks releases these ions so slowly that it has a negligible effect on the availability of fixed nitrogen. Therefore, nitrogen is often the limiting factor for growth and biomass production in all environments where there is a suitable climate and availability of water to support life.

Microorganisms have a central role in almost all aspects of nitrogen availability, and therefore for life support on earth. Some bacteria can convert N_{2} into ammonia by the process termed nitrogen fixation; these bacteria are either free-living or form symbiotic associations with plants or other organisms (e.g., termites, protozoa), while other bacteria bring about transformations of ammonia to nitrate, and of nitrate to N_{2} or other nitrogen gases. Many bacteria and fungi degrade organic matter, releasing fixed nitrogen for reuse by other organisms. All these processes contribute to the nitrogen cycle.

Nitrogen enters the plant largely through the roots. A "pool" of soluble nitrogen accumulates. Its composition within a species varies widely depending on several factors, including day length, time of day, night temperatures, nutrient deficiencies, and nutrient imbalance. Short day length promotes asparagine formation, whereas glutamine is produced under long day regimes. Darkness favors protein breakdown accompanied by high asparagine accumulation. Night temperature modifies the effects due to night length, and soluble nitrogen tends to accumulate owing to retarded synthesis and breakdown of proteins. Low night temperature conserves glutamine; high night temperature increases accumulation of asparagine because of breakdown. Deficiency of K accentuates differences between long- and short-day plants. The pool of soluble nitrogen is much smaller than in well-nourished plants when N and P are deficient since uptake of nitrate and further reduction and conversion of N to organic forms are restricted more than is protein synthesis. Deficiencies of Ca, K, and S affect the conversion of organic N to protein more than uptake and reduction. The size of the pool of soluble N is no guide per se to growth rate, but the size of the pool in relation to total N might be a useful ratio in this regard. Nitrogen availability in the rooting medium also affects the size and structure of tracheids formed in the long lateral roots of white spruce (Krasowski and Owens 1999).

=== Root environment ===
==== Mycorrhiza ====
Phosphorus is most commonly found in the soil in the form of polyprotic phosphoric acid (H_{3}PO_{4}), but is taken up most readily in the form of H_{2}PO^{−}_{4}. Phosphorus is available to plants in limited quantities in most soils because it is released very slowly from insoluble phosphates and is rapidly fixed once again. Under most environmental conditions it is the element that limits growth because of this constriction and due to its high demand by plants and microorganisms. Plants can increase phosphorus uptake by a mutualism with mycorrhiza. On some soils, the phosphorus nutrition of some conifers, including the spruces, depends on the ability of mycorrhizae to take up, and make soil phosphorus available to the tree, hitherto unobtainable to the non-mycorrhizal root. Seedling white spruce, greenhouse-grown in sand testing negative for phosphorus, were very small and purple for many months until spontaneous mycorrhizal inoculation, the effect of which was manifested by a greening of foliage and the development of vigorous shoot growth.

==== Root temperature ====
When soil-potassium levels are high, plants take up more potassium than needed for healthy growth. The term luxury consumption has been applied to this. Potassium intake increases with root temperature and depresses calcium uptake. Calcium to boron ratio must be maintained in a narrow range for normal plant growth. Lack of boron causes failure of calcium metabolism which produces hollow heart in peanuts and black heart in beets.

=== Nutrient interactions ===
Calcium and magnesium inhibit the uptake of trace metals. Copper and zinc mutually reduce uptake of each other. Zinc also effects iron levels of plants. These interactions are dependent on species and growing conditions. For example, for clover, lettuce and red beet plants nearing toxic levels of zinc, copper and nickel, these three elements increased the toxicity of the others in a positive relationship. In barley positive interaction was observed between copper and zinc, while in French beans the positive interaction occurred between nickel and zinc. Other researchers have studied the synergistic and antagonistic effects of soil conditions on lead, zinc, cadmium and copper in radish plants to develop predictive indicators for uptake like soil pH.

Calcium absorption is increased by water-soluble phosphate fertilizers, and is used when potassium and potash fertilizers decrease the uptake of phosphorus, magnesium and calcium. For these reasons, imbalanced application of potassium fertilizers can markedly decrease crop yields.

=== Solubility and soil pH ===
Boron is available to plants over a range of pH, from 5.0 to 7.5. Boron is absorbed by plants in the form of the anion BO^{3−}_{3}. It is available to plants in moderately soluble mineral forms of Ca, Mg and Na borates and the highly soluble form of organic compounds. It is mobile in the soil, hence, it is prone to leaching. Leaching removes substantial amounts of boron in sandy soil, but little in fine silt or clay soil. Boron's fixation to those minerals at high pH can render boron unavailable, while low pH frees the fixed boron, leaving it prone to leaching in wet climates. It precipitates with other minerals in the form of borax in which form it was first used over 400 years ago as a soil supplement. Decomposition of organic material causes boron to be deposited in the topmost soil layer. When soil dries it can cause a precipitous drop in the availability of boron to plants as the plants cannot draw nutrients from that desiccated layer. Hence, boron deficiency diseases appear in dry weather.

Most of the nitrogen taken up by plants is from the soil in the forms of NO^{−}_{3}, although in acid environments such as boreal forests where nitrification is less likely to occur, ammonium NH^{+}_{4} is more likely to be the dominating source of nitrogen. Amino acids and proteins can only be built from NH^{+}_{4}, so NO^{−}_{3} must be reduced.

Fe and Mn become oxidized and are highly unavailable in acidic soils.

== Measurements ==
Nutrient status (mineral nutrient and trace element composition, also called ionome and nutrient profile) of plants are commonly portrayed by tissue elementary analysis. Interpretation of the results of such studies, however, has been controversial. During recent decades the nearly two-century-old "law of minimum" or "Liebig's law" (that states that plant growth is controlled not by the total amount of resources available, but by the scarcest resource) has been replaced by several mathematical approaches that use different models in order to take the interactions between the individual nutrients into account.

Later developments in this field were based on the fact that the nutrient elements (and compounds) do not act independently from each other; Baxter, 2015, because there may be direct chemical interactions between them or they may influence each other's uptake, translocation, and biological action via a number of mechanisms as exemplified for the case of ammonia.

== Plant nutrition in agricultural systems ==
=== Fertilizers ===
Boron is highly soluble in the form of borax or boric acid and is too easily leached from soil making these forms unsuitable for use as a fertilizer. Calcium borate is less soluble and can be made from sodium tetraborate. Boron is often applied to fields as a contaminant in other soil amendments but is not generally adequate to make up the rate of loss by cropping. The rates of application of borate to produce an adequate alfalfa crop range from 15 pounds per acre for a sandy-silt, acidic soil of low organic matter, to 60 pounds per acre for a soil with high organic matter, high cation exchange capacity and high pH. Application rates should be limited to a few pounds per acre in a test plot to determine if boron is needed generally. Otherwise, testing for boron levels in plant material is required to determine remedies. Excess boron can be removed by irrigation and assisted by application of elemental sulfur to lower the pH and increase boron solubility. Foliar sprays are used on fruit crop trees in soils of high alkalinity.

Selenium is, however, an essential mineral element for animal (including human) nutrition and selenium deficiencies are known to occur when food or animal feed is grown on selenium-deficient soils. The use of inorganic selenium fertilizers can increase selenium concentrations in edible crops and animal diets thereby improving animal health.

It is useful to apply a high phosphorus content fertilizer, such as bone meal, to perennials to help with successful root formation.

=== Hydroponics ===
Hydroponics is a method for growing plants in a water-nutrient solution without using nutrient-rich soil or substrates. Researchers and home gardeners can grow their plants in a controlled environment. The most common artificial nutrient solution is the Hoagland solution, developed by D. R. Hoagland and W. C. Snyder in 1933. The solution (known as A-Z solution) consists of all the essential macro- and micronutrients in the correct proportions necessary for most plant growth. An aerator is used to prevent an anoxic event or hypoxia. Hypoxia can affect the nutrient uptake of a plant because, without oxygen present, respiration becomes inhibited within the root cells. The nutrient film technique is a hydroponic technique in which the roots are not fully submerged. Incomplete submergence allows for adequate aeration of the roots, while a "film" thin layer of nutrient-rich water is pumped through the system to provide nutrients and water to the plant.

== See also ==
- Horticulture
- International Plant Nutrition Colloquium
- Nutrient pollution
- Photosynthesis
- Plant physiology
- Phytochemistry
- Plant hormone
- Resource recovery
- Soil
