= IPNC =

IPNC may refer to the following:

- International Pinot Noir Celebration
- International Plant Nutrition Colloquium
- International Pathogenic Neisseria Conference
