= Bitter pit =

Plant disorder

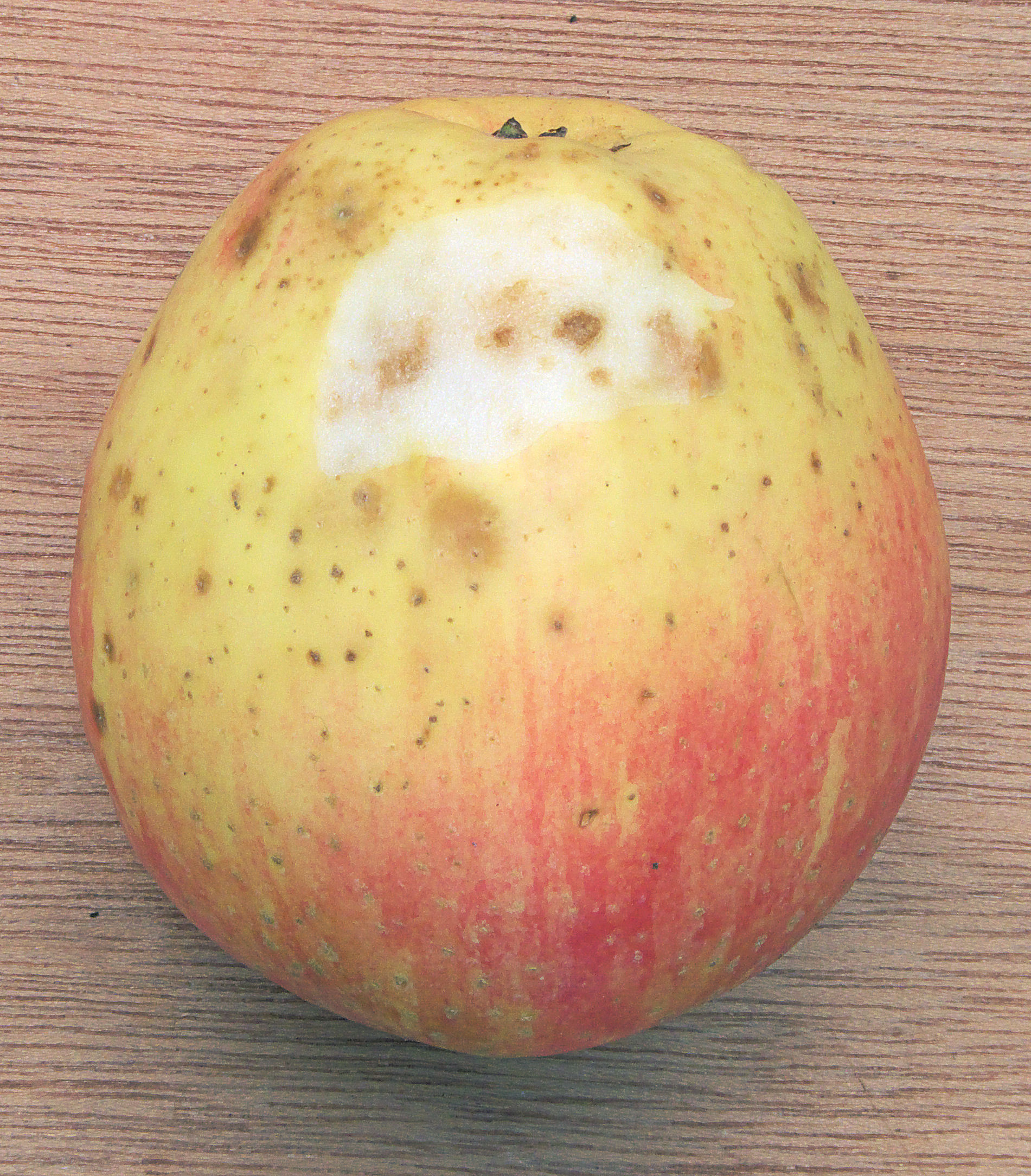
Bitter pit in the 'Summerred' cultivar

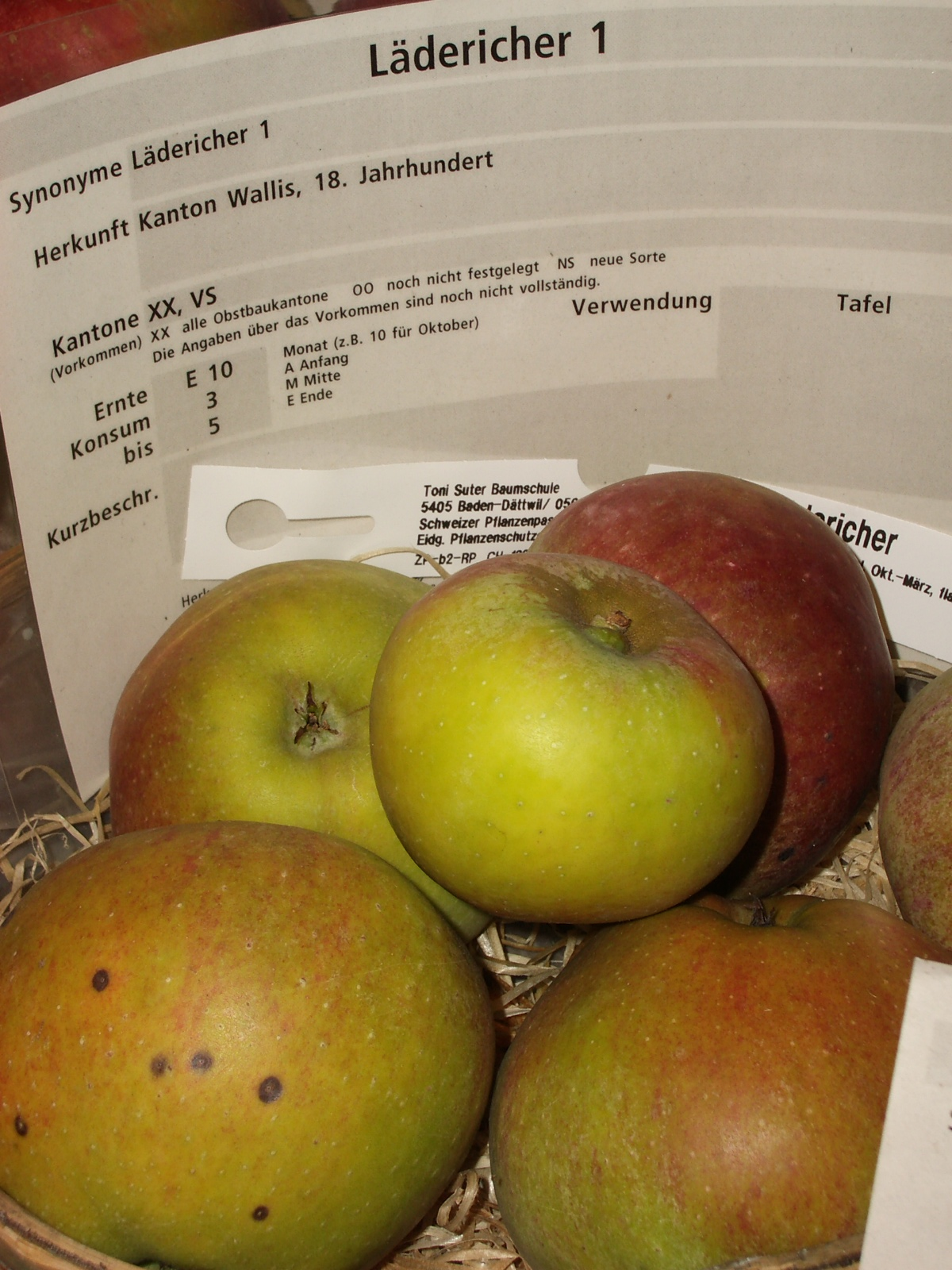
Signs of bitter pit beginning on one apple, lower left

Bitter pit is a disorder in apple fruits, now believed to be induced by calcium deficiency. It occurs less commonly in pears.

The disease was probably first reported in Germany where it was known as Stippen. It was also known as "Baldwin spot" and "blotchy cork" in North America. The name "bitter pit" was first used by Cobb in Australia in 1895. The disease has been shown as non-pathological and is now known as a disorder. When it occurs on the tree, it is known as "tree pit"; it may also occur in storage, when it is known as "storage pit".

== Symptoms ==
The affected fruit have dark spots, about ½ cm diameter, which occur on the skin or in the flesh or both. The cells in the spots are dead (necrotic), and turn brown-black.

== Causes ==
Early reports indicated that the disorder was affected by climate and growing conditions. Dry weather before harvest seemed to increase the condition. Light crops, heavy use of fertilizers, large fruit and early harvesting increased the condition. Fruit that were free of bitter pit at harvest were often severely affected after a short period of storage. Bitter pit has been widely reviewed over many decades.

The disorder became a major problem for exports from the Southern Hemisphere to Europe. The breakthrough in control came with the discovery in North America that the mineral calcium was low in affected fruit. This was confirmed elsewhere.

== Control ==
Several decades of research in several countries with many cultivars showed that moderate levels of bitter pit could be controlled with the spraying of the trees with calcium chloride or calcium nitrate during the growing season. However, in the southern hemisphere where highly susceptible fruit had to be harvested early for export to Europe, the problem remained. An attempt to increase the calcium content by applying calcium after harvest had resulted in severe injury to the fruit. Export of susceptible apples from New Zealand was under threat and new methods for controlling bitter pit were investigated. While it was shown that bitter pit was reduced as calcium levels rose, it was not possible to determine a minimum level of calcium that would ensure that the disorder was controlled. The most effective treatment found for closed calyx fruit was to submerge the fruit in the calcium chloride solution and to apply a vacuum and immediately rinse in water. This overcame the injury problem and gave much better control of the disorder. The vacuum treatment was commercialized in New Zealand for the Cox's Orange Pippin cultivar in 1978, and was used for several years. However the treatment was expensive and could not be used for open calyx cultivars.

A simpler treatment was developed in Western Australia and was adopted in Australia and in New Zealand. This involved dipping the fruit in the calcium solution and rinsing in water after about 36 hours. This treatment has been confirmed by independent workers and has generally been adopted in Australia and New Zealand. Postharvest dipping in a calcium solution has been recommended in some other countries where bitter pit is severe. However the problem of fruit injury does not seem to have been addressed.

It appears that bitter pit can generally be reduced by using good horticultural practices. Usually spraying throughout the growing season with a calcium salt is also necessary for moderately susceptible cultivars. It is more difficult to control storage pit in highly susceptible cultivars as field spraying may not be able to apply sufficient calcium to the fruit. Improved control can be obtained by also dipping the fruit in a 2–3 per cent calcium chloride solution after harvest and rinsing the fruit in water after about 36 hours.
