= International Plant Nutrition Colloquium =

The International Plant Nutrition Colloquium (IPNC) is an international conference held every four years for the promotion of research within the field of plant nutrition. Prior to 1981, it was known as the International Colloquium on Plant Analysis and Fertiliser Problems. The IPNC is organised by the International Plant Nutrition Council, which "seeks to advance science-based non-commercial research and education in plant nutrition in order to highlight the importance of this scientific field for crop production, food security, human health and sustainable environmental protection". It is considered that the IPNC is the most important international meeting on plant nutrition globally, with more than 800 delegates attending each meeting. The IPNC covers research in the fields of plant mineral nutrition, plant molecular biology, plant genetics, agronomy, horticulture, ecology, environmental sciences, and fertilizer use and production.

In honour of Professor Horst Marschner, who was a passionate supporter of students and young researchers, the IPNC has established the Marschner Young Scientist Award for outstanding early-career researchers and PhD students with a potential to become future research leaders.

The current President of the International Plant Nutrition Council is Professor Ciro A. Rosolem from the São Paulo State University. The next IPNC is to be held in Iguazu Falls, Brazil, from 22-27 August 2022.

Past and future locations for the IPNC:

IPNC	Year	Location
20th	2025	Porto, Portugal
19th	2022	Iguazu Falls, Brazil
18th	2017	Copenhagen, Denmark
17th	2013	Istanbul, Turkey
16th	2009	Sacramento, United States
15th	2005	Beijing, China
14th	2001	Hannover, Germany
13th	1997	Tokyo, Japan
12th	1993	Perth, Australia
11th	1989	Wageningen, Netherlands
10th	1986	Rockville, United States
9th	1982	Coventry, England
8th	1978	Auckland, New Zealand
7th	1974	Hannover, Germany
6th	1970	Tel-Aviv, Israel
5th	1966	Brussels, Belgium
4th	1962	Brussels, Belgium
3rd	1959	Montreal, Canada
2nd	1956	Paris, France
1st	1954	Paris, France
