= Calcium deficiency (plant) =

Plant disorder

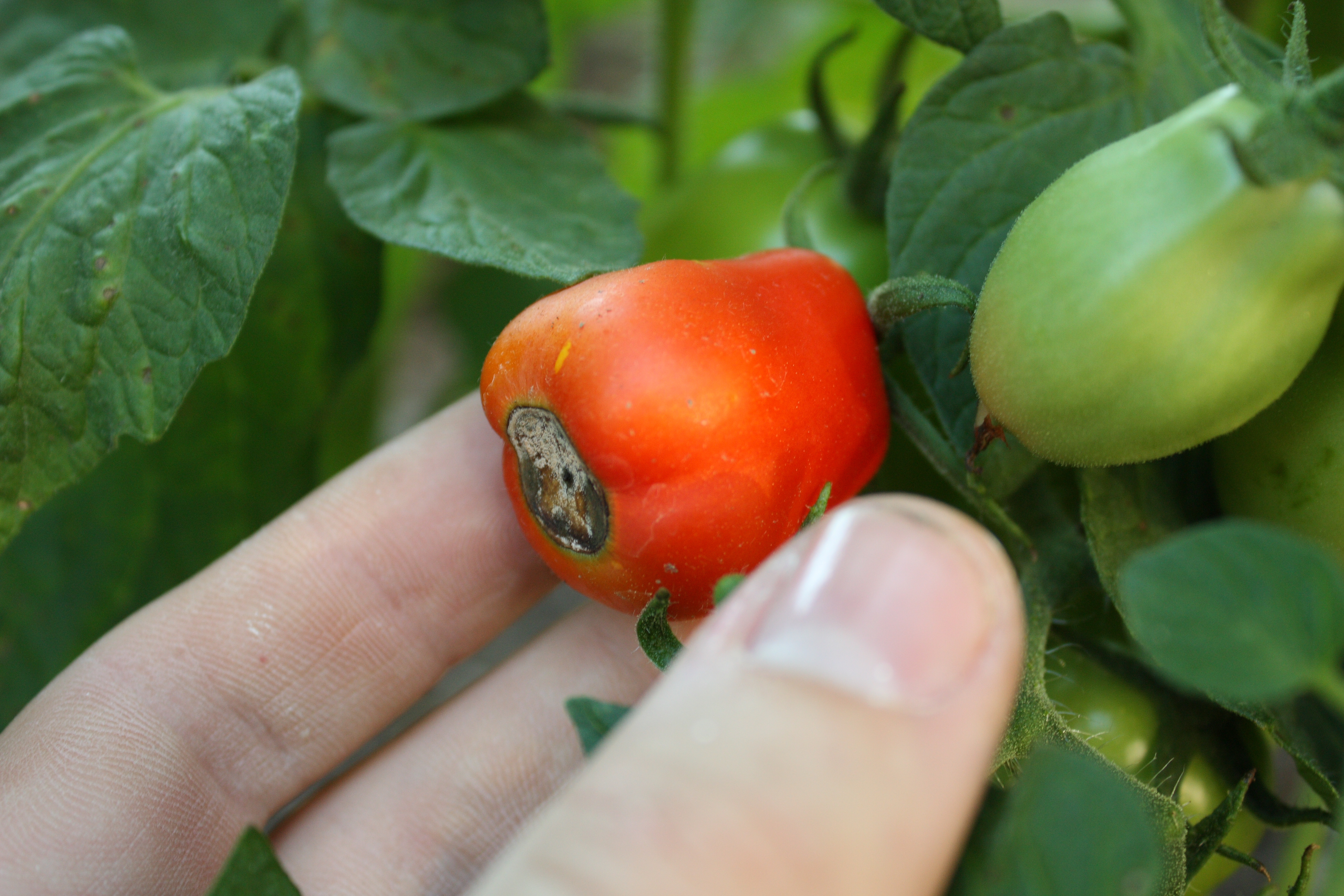
Calcium roots loss (blossom end rot) on a tomato

Calcium (Ca) deficiency is a plant disorder that can be caused by insufficient level of biologically available calcium in the growing medium, but is more frequently a product of low transpiration of the whole plant or more commonly the affected tissue. Plants are susceptible to such localized calcium deficiencies in low or non-transpiring tissues because calcium is not transported in the phloem. This may be due to water shortages, which slow the transportation of calcium to the plant, poor uptake of calcium through the stem, or too much nitrogen in the soil.

== Causes ==
Acidic, sandy, or coarse soils often contain less calcium. Uneven soil moisture and overuse of fertilizers can also cause calcium deficiency. At times, even with sufficient calcium in the soil, it can be in an insoluble form and is then unusable by the plant or it could be attributed to a "transport protein". Soils containing high phosphorus are particularly susceptible to creating insoluble forms of calcium.

Calcium and magnesium are opposed within the plant cells, and have antagonistic interactions. As a result, a homeostatic balance between Ca and Mg within the plant is necessary for optimal growth and proper development.

== Symptoms ==
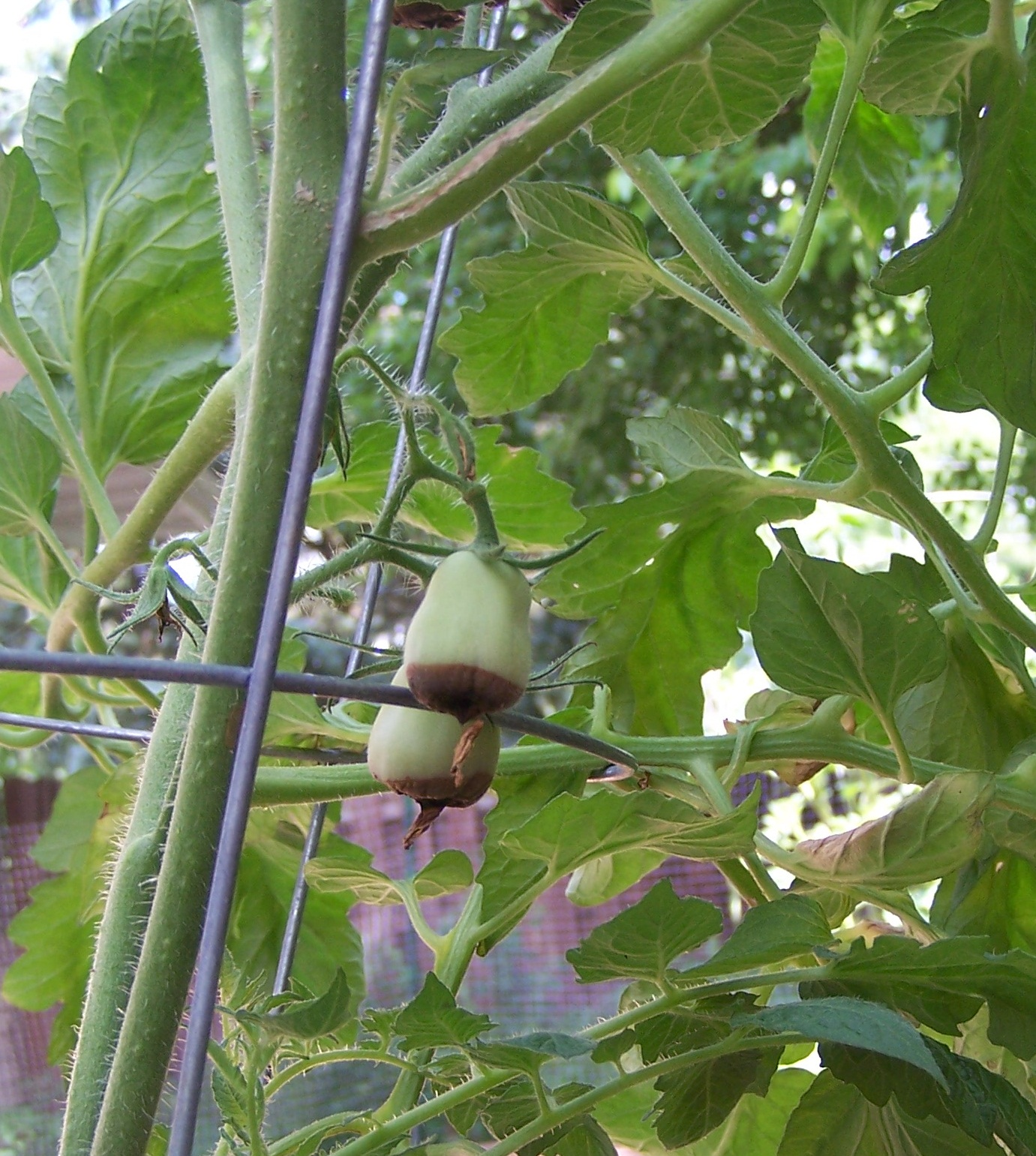
Blossom end rot on a grape tomato

Calcium deficiency symptoms appear initially as localized tissue necrosis leading to stunted plant growth, necrotic leaf margins on young leaves or curling of the leaves, and eventual death of terminal buds and root tips. Generally, the new growth and rapidly growing tissues of the plant are affected first. The mature leaves are rarely if ever affected because calcium accumulates to high concentrations in older leaves. Calcium deficiencies in plants are associated with reduced height, fewer nodes, and less leaf area.

Crop-specific symptoms include:

Apple
'Bitter pit' – fruit skins develop pits, brown spots appear on skin and/or in flesh and taste of those areas is bitter. This usually occurs when fruit is in storage, and Bramley apples are particularly susceptible. Related to boron deficiency, "water cored" apples seldom display bitter pit effects.
Cabbage, lettuce and brussels sprouts
There is some evidence that plants like lettuce are more likely to experience tipburn (burned edges of leaves) if they're experiencing a deficiency of calcium.
Carrot
'Cavity spot' – oval spots develop into craters which may be invaded by other disease-causing organisms.
Celery
Stunted growth, central leaves stunted.
Tomatoes and peppers
'Blossom end rot' – Symptoms start as sunken, dry decaying areas at the blossom end of the fruit, furthest away from the stem, not all fruit on a truss is necessarily affected. Sometimes rapid growth from high-nitrogen fertilizers may exacerbate blossom end rot. Water management and preventing water stress is key to minimizing its occurrence. Although it was once common knowledge that blossom end rot was caused by calcium deficiencies, there are also other proposed causes.

== Treatment ==
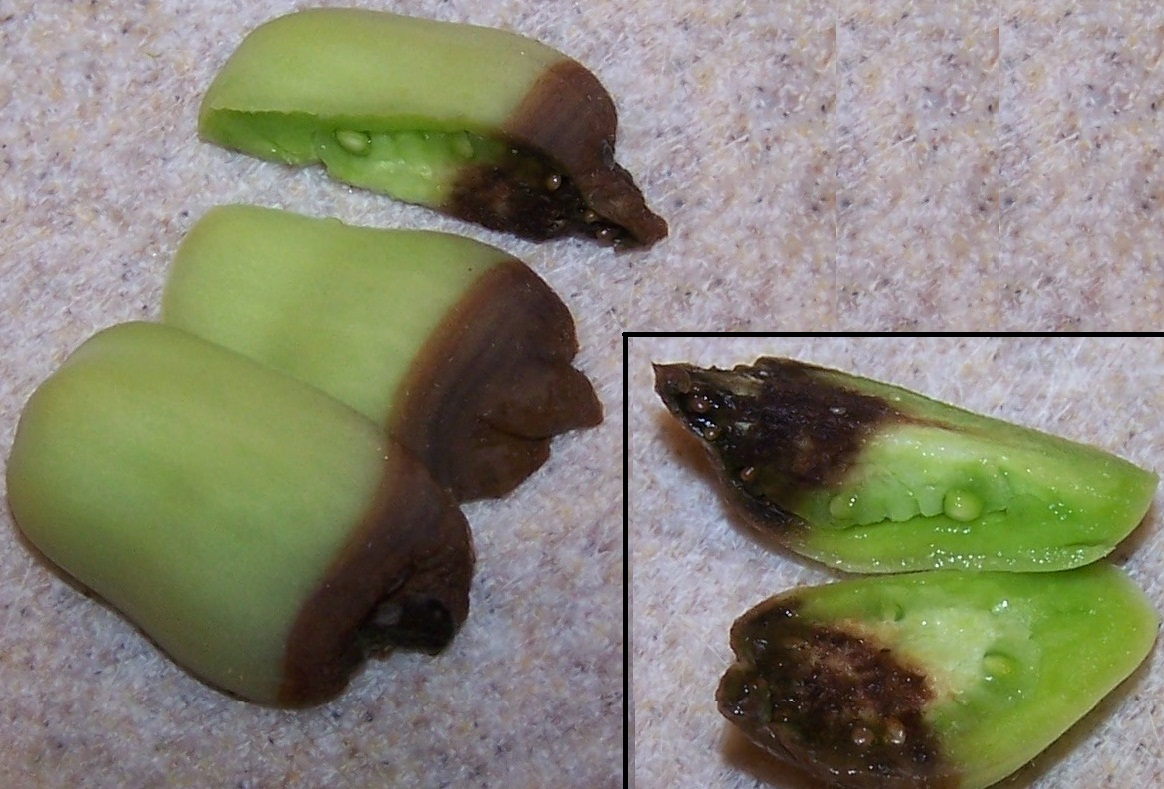
Dissection of grape tomato with blossom end rot

Calcium deficiency can sometimes be rectified by adding agricultural lime to acid soils, aiming at a pH of 6.5, unless the subject plants specifically prefer acidic soil. Organic matter should be added to the soil to improve its moisture-retaining capacity. However, because of the nature of the disorder (i.e. poor transport of calcium to low transpiring tissues), the problem cannot generally be cured by the addition of calcium to the roots. In some species, the problem can be reduced by prophylactic spraying with calcium chloride of tissues at risk.

Plant damage is difficult to reverse, so corrective action should be taken immediately, supplemental applications of calcium nitrate at 200 ppm nitrogen, for example. Soil pH should be tested, and corrected if needed, because calcium deficiency is often associated with low pH. Early fruit will generally have the worst symptoms, with them typically lessening as the season progresses. Preventative measures, such as irrigating prior to especially high temperatures and stable irrigation will minimize the occurrence.

== See also ==
- Blackheart (plant disease)
- Plant nutrition
- Horticulture
