= Zinc deficiency (plant disorder) =

Plant condition characterised by an inability to obtain zinc

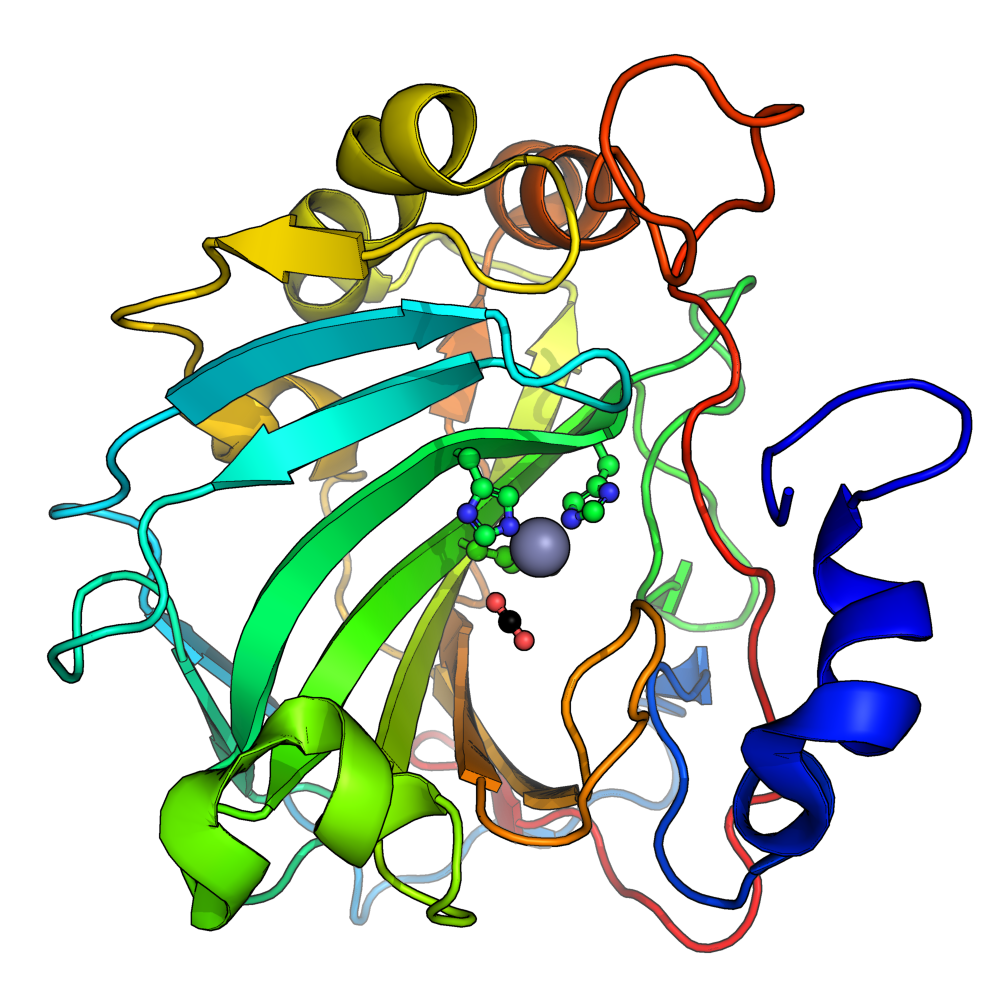
Carbonic anhydrase, an enzyme that requires zinc (gray sphere in this image), is essential for plant health.

Zinc deficiency occurs when plant growth is limited because the plant cannot take up sufficient quantities of this essential micronutrient from its growing medium. Zinc is one of the most important micronutrients.

== Symptoms ==
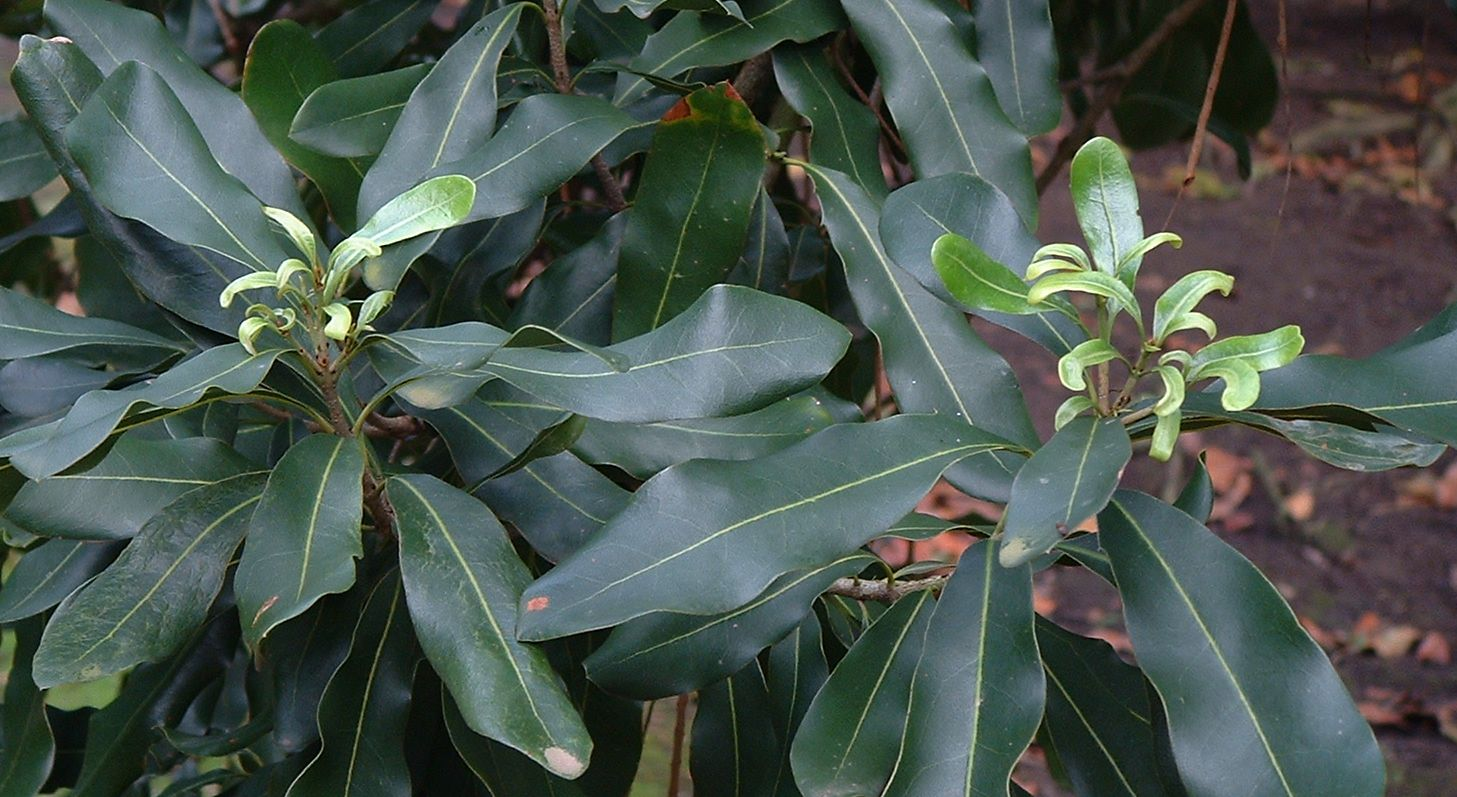
Macadamia shoots showing zinc deficiency symptoms. The youngest leaves show chlorosis (yellowing), dwarfing and malformation.

Visible deficiency symptoms include:

- Chlorosis - yellowing of leaves; often interveinal; in some species, young leaves are the most affected, but in others both old and new leaves are chlorotic;
- Necrotic spots - death of leaf tissue on areas of chlorosis;
- Bronzing of leaves - chlorotic areas may turn bronze coloured;
- Rosetting of leaves - zinc-deficient dicotyledons often have shortened internodes, so leaves are clustered on the stem;
- Stunting of plants - small plants may occur as a result of reduced growth or because of reduced internode elongation;
- Dwarf leaves ('little leaf') - small leaves that often show chlorosis, necrotic spots or bronzing;
- Malformed leaves - leaves are often narrower or have wavy margins.

== Soil conditions ==
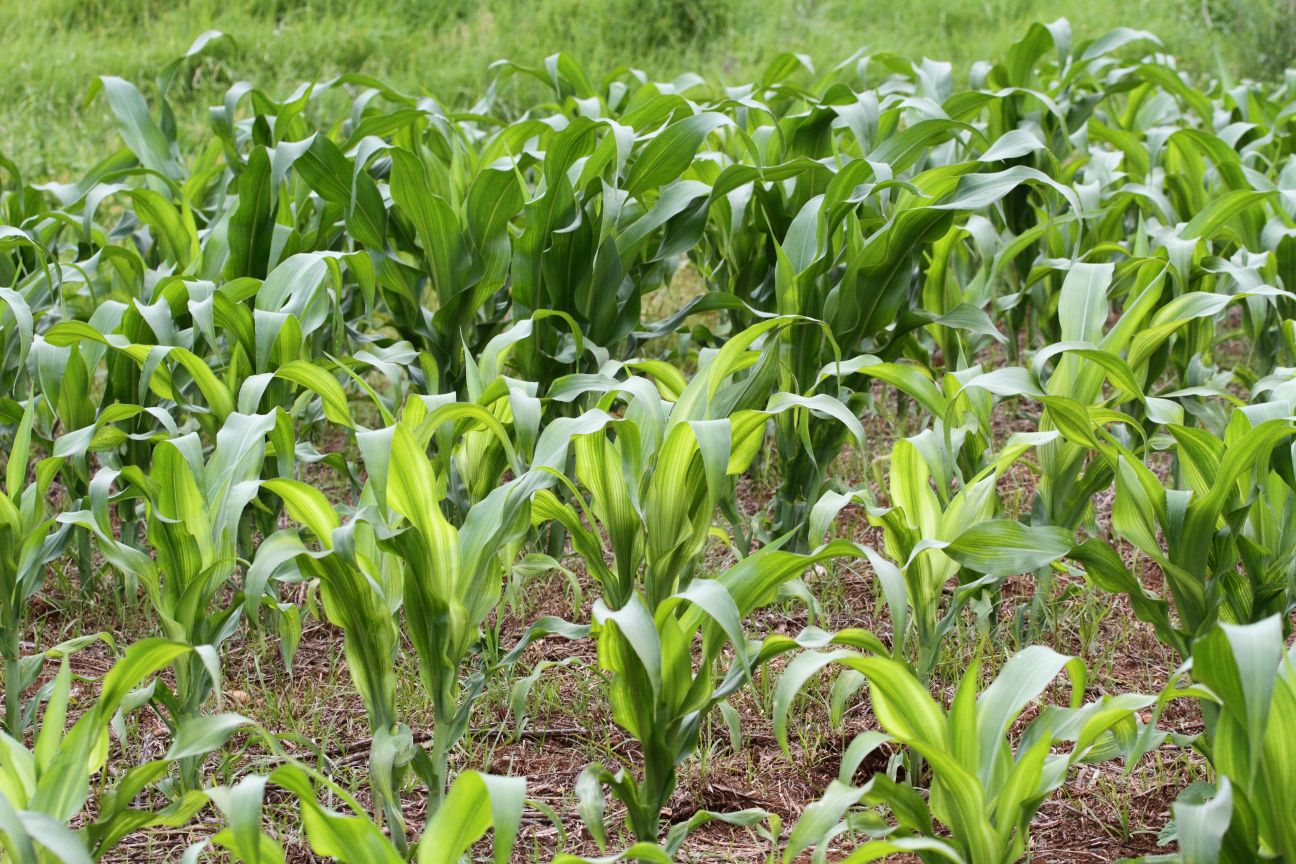
Maize plants with severe zinc deficiency in the foreground, with healthier plants (planted at the same time) in the background.

Zinc deficiency is common in many different types of soil; some soils (sandy soils, histosols and soils developed from highly weathered parent material) have low total zinc concentrations, and others have low plant-available zinc due to strong zinc sorption (calcareous soils, highly weathered soils, vertisols, hydromorphic soils, saline soils). Soils low in organic matter (such as where topsoils have been removed), and compacted soils that restrict root proliferation also have a high risk of zinc deficiency. Application of phosphorus fertilizers has frequently been associated with zinc deficiency; this may be due to enhanced sorption by clay minerals (especially iron oxides), suppression of vesicular arbuscular mycorrhizae and/or immobilization of zinc in plant tissues. Liming of soils also frequently induces zinc deficiency by increasing zinc sorption.

== Treatment ==
Zinc is an essential micronutrient which means it is essential for plant growth and development, but is required in very small quantities. Although zinc requirements vary among crops, zinc leaf concentrations (on a dry matter basis) in the range 20 to 100 mg/kg are adequate for most crops.

Zinc sulphate or zinc oxide can be applied to soils to correct zinc deficiency. Recommended applications of actual zinc range from 5 to 100 kg/hectare but optimum levels of zinc vary with plant type and the severity of the deficiency. Application of zinc may not correct zinc deficiency in alkaline soils because even with the addition of zinc, it may remain unavailable for plant absorption.

Foliar applications of zinc as zinc sulphate or as zinc chelate (or other organic complexes) are also widely used, especially with fruit trees and grape vines. Zinc can also be supplied as a seed treatment, or by root-dipping of transplant seedlings.

== Functions ==
Zinc is a cofactor in a number of enzymes.

Zinc deficiency increases membrane leakiness as zinc-containing enzymes are involved in the detoxification of membrane-damaging oxygen radicals. Zinc may be involved in the control of gene expression; it appears important in stabilizing RNA and DNA structure, in maintaining the activity of DNA-synthesizing enzymes and in controlling the activity of RNA-degrading enzymes.

Almost half of the world's cereal crops are grown on zinc-deficient soils; as a result, zinc deficiency in humans is a widespread problem.
