= Molybdenum deficiency (plant disorder) =

Molybdenum (Mo) deficiency occurs when plant growth is limited because the plant cannot take up sufficient quantities of this essential micronutrient from its growing medium. For crops growing in soil, this may be a result of low concentrations of Mo in the soil as a whole (i.e. the parent material of the soil is low in Mo), or because the soil Mo is held in forms that are not available to plants – sorption of Mo is strongest in acid soils.

Nitrogenase with Mo-containing catalytic sites highlighted. This enzyme is mainly responsible for fixing nitrogen.

== Functions ==
In plants, Mo is essential for several enzymes including:

- Nitrogenase, which is required for biological N_{2} fixation by both asymbiotic and symbiotic nitrogen-fixing bacteria;
- Nitrate reductase, which is required for the reduction of nitrate – this is necessary for the incorporation of nitrate-N in proteins; and
- Xanthine dehydrogenase, which is involved in the synthesis of uric acid from purines.

== Symptoms ==
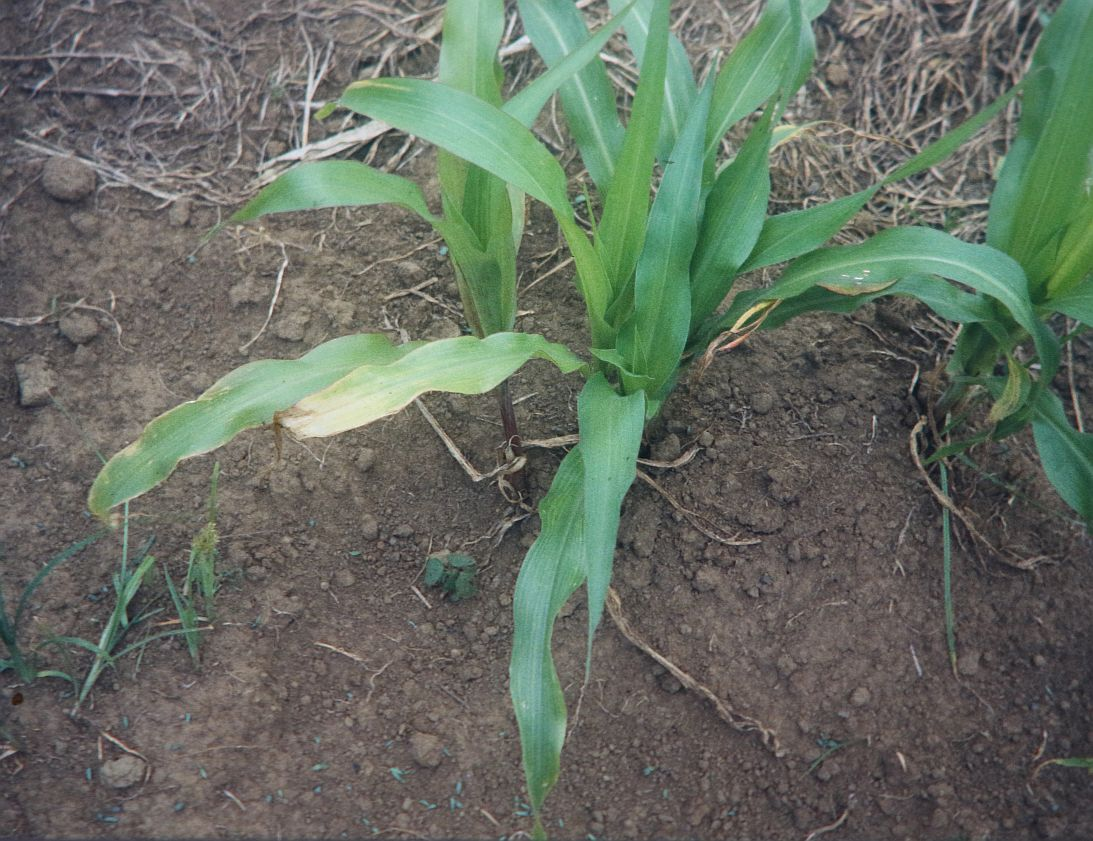
The two maize plants on the left are showing Mo deficiency symptoms. Plants were growing on acid soils in Vulindlela, KwaZulu-Natal

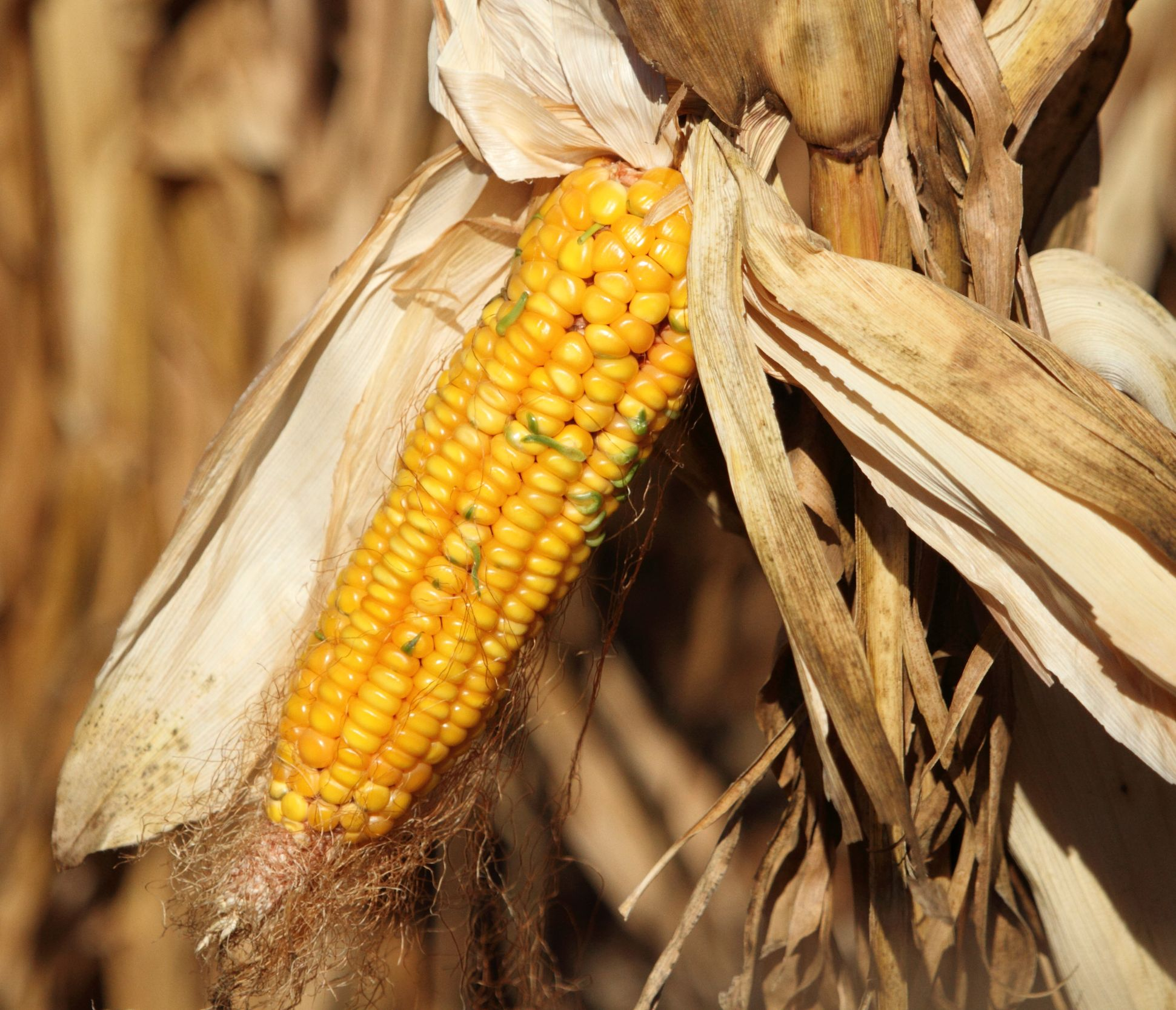
Premature germination of maize on the cob before harvest. From a plot with severe soil acidity at Nthabamhlope, KwaZulu-Natal

Molybdenum deficiency symptoms in most plants are associated with a build-up of nitrate in the affected plant part. This is a result of poor nitrate reductase activity. Symptoms include:

- pale leaves with interveinal and marginal chlorosis (yellowing) and necrosis (scald);
- the whiptail disorder in Brassica crops (especially cauliflower);
- decreased tasselling in maize;
- premature germination of maize grain.

In legumes, inhibition of N_{2} fixation may lead to pale, yellowing, nitrogen-deficient plants. The size and number of root nodules are often reduced.

== Soil conditions ==
Molybdenum deficiency is common in many different types of soil; some soils have low total Mo concentrations, and others have low plant-available Mo due to strong Mo sorption. Symptoms are most common where both conditions apply, such as in acid sandy soils. Molybdenum may be strongly sorbed in ironstone soils. Liming of soils frequently relieves Mo deficiency by decreasing Mo sorption.

== Molybdenum requirements ==
Molybdenum is an essential micronutrient which means it is essential for plant growth and development, but is required in very small quantities. Although Mo requirements vary among crops, Mo leaf concentrations (on a dry matter basis) in the range 0.2–2.0 mg kg^{−1} are adequate for most crops.

== Treatment ==
Raising the soil pH by liming frequently relieves Mo deficiency. In many situations, however, a soil-, seed- or foliar application of a Mo fertilizer is far more cost-effective than the use of lime to increase Mo availability. Sodium molybdate is a typical source of Mo. Typical soil and foliar application rates are 50–200 g Mo ha^{−1}; recommended rates for seed treatment range from 7–100 g Mo ha^{−1}. Other sources recommend application levels of 0.25 kg/acre.
