= Manganese deficiency (plant) =

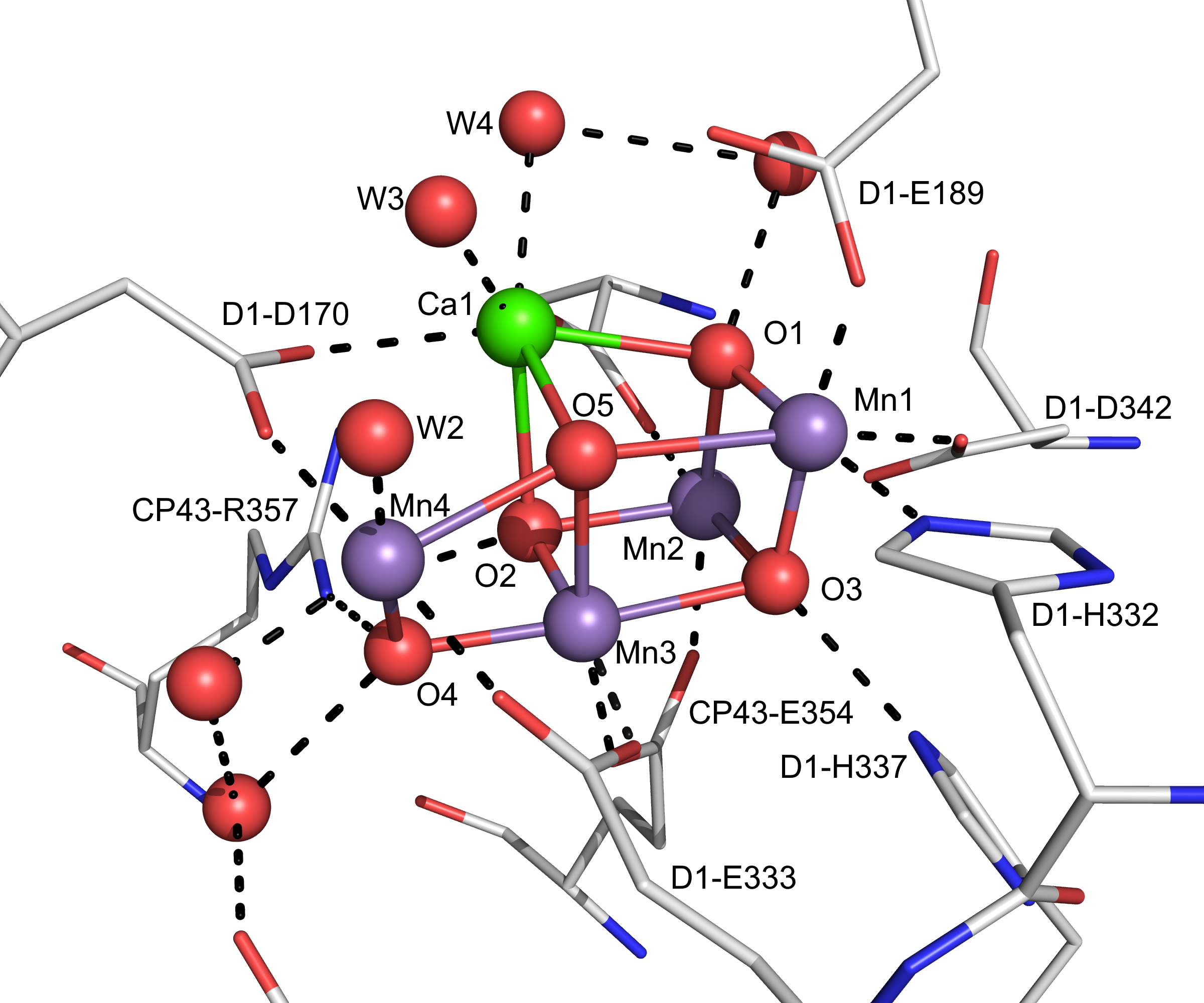
Structure of the Mn_{4}O_{5}Ca core of the oxygen-evolving site in plants, illustrating one of many roles of the trace mineral manganese.

Manganese (Mn) deficiency is a plant disorder that is often confused with, and occurs with, iron deficiency. Most common in poorly drained soils, also where organic matter levels are high. Manganese may be unavailable to plants where pH is high.

Affected plants include onion, apple, peas, French beans, cherry and raspberry, and symptoms include yellowing of leaves with smallest leaf veins remaining green to produce a ‘chequered’ effect. The plant may seem to grow away from the problem so that younger leaves may appear to be unaffected. Brown spots may appear on leaf surfaces, and severely affected leaves turn brown and wither.

== Symptoms ==
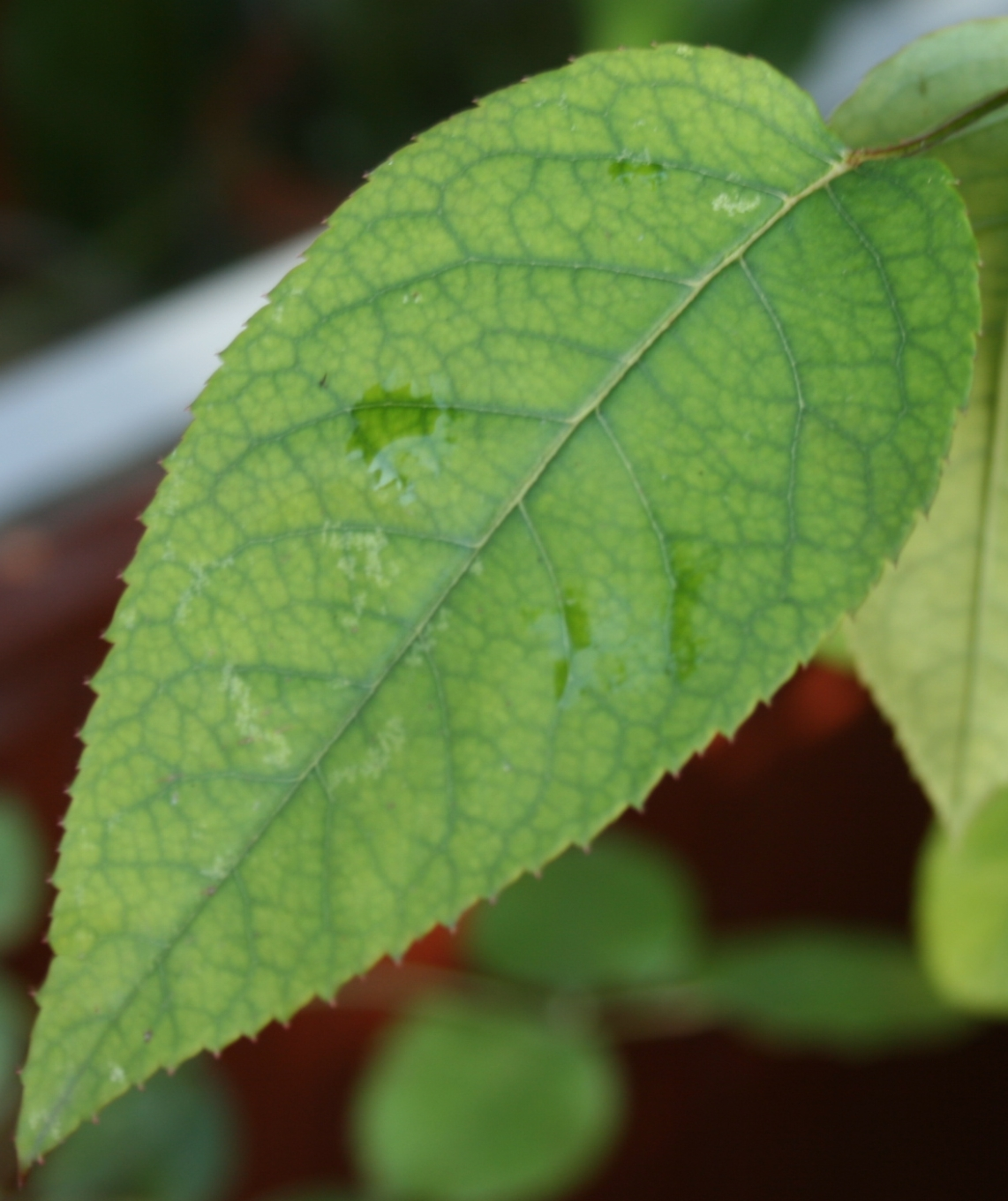
Effects of manganese deficiency on a rose plant.

Manganese deficiency can be easy to spot in plants because, much like Magnesium deficiency (agriculture), the leaves start to turn yellow and undergo interveinal chlorosis. The difference between these two is that the younger leaves near the top of the plant show symptoms first because manganese is not mobile while in magnesium deficiency show symptoms in older leaves near the bottom of the plant.

== Treatment ==
Manganese deficiency is easy to cure and homeowners have several options when treating these symptoms. The first is to adjust the soil pH. Two materials commonly used for lowering the soil pH are ammonium sulfate and sulfur. Ammonium sulfate will change the soil pH instantly because the ammonium produces the acidity as soon as it dissolves in the soil. Sulfur, however, requires some time for the conversion to sulfuric acid by soil bacteria. If the soil pH is not a problem and there is no manganese in the soil then Foliar feeding for small plants and Medicaps for large trees are both common ways for homeowners to get manganese into the plant.

To mitigate issues with manganese deficiency, Manganese oxide and sulfate are components of fertilizers. In the year 2000, an estimated 20,000 tons of these compounds were used in fertilizers in the US alone.
