= Phosphorus deficiency =

Plant disorder

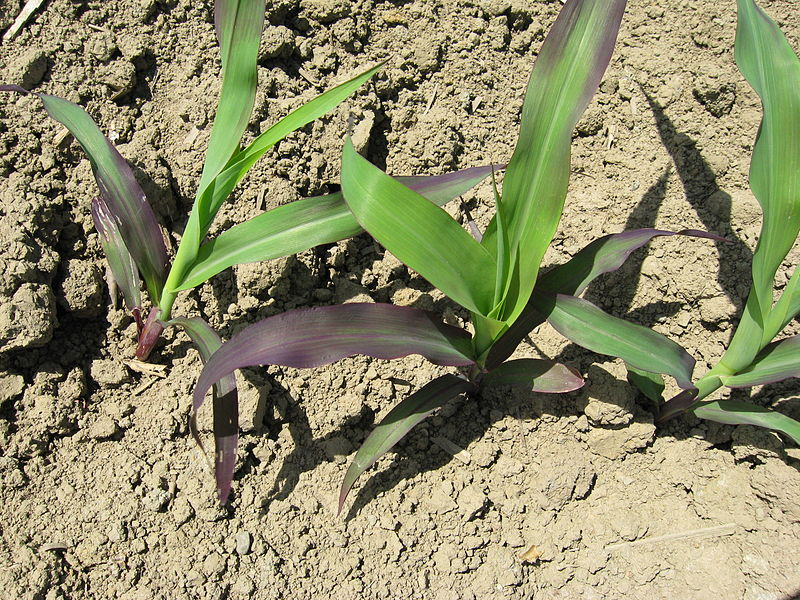
Phosphorus deficiency on corn

Phosphorus deficiency is a plant disorder associated with insufficient supply of phosphorus. Phosphorus refers here to salts of phosphates (PO^{3−}_{4}), monohydrogen phosphate (HPO^{2−}_{4}), and dihydrogen phosphate (H_{2}PO^{−}_{4}). These anions readily interconvert, and the predominant species is determined by the pH of the solution or soil. Phosphates are required for the biosynthesis of genetic material as well as ATP, essential for life. Phosphorus deficiency can be controlled by applying sources of phosphorus such as bone meal, rock phosphate, manure, and phosphate-fertilizers.

== Symptoms ==
In plants, phosphorus (P) is considered second to nitrogen as the most essential nutrient to ensure health and function. Phosphorus is used by plants in numerous processes such as photophosphorylation, genetic transfer, the transportation of nutrients, and phospholipid cell membranes. Within a plant cell these functions are imperative for function, in photophosphorylation for example the creation of stored energy in plants is a result of a chemical reaction including phosphorus. Phosphorus is a key molecular component of genetic reproduction. When phosphorus is present in inadequate levels, genetic processes such as cell division and plant growth are impaired. Hence, phosphorus deficient plants may mature at a slower rate than plants with adequate amounts of phosphorus. The stunted growth induced by phosphorus deficiency has been correlated with smaller leaf sizes and a lessened number of leaves. Phosphorus deficiency may also create an imbalance in the storage of carbohydrates. Photosynthesis, the main function of plant cells that produces energy from sunlight and water, usually remains at a normal rate under a phosphorus-deficient state. However phosphorus usage in functions within the cell usually slow. This imbalance of rates in phosphorus deficient plants leads to the buildup of excess carbohydrate within the plant as starch granules. A change in root structure can also occur, where growth of lateral roots is favored while halting taproot growth. Root secretion of ribonucleases and acid phosphatases is promoted to scavange phosphorus, in some cases accompanied by organic acids that help degrade aluminum complexes with inorganic phosphate in soil. Reactive anthocyanin synthesis induced by low phosphorus often can be observed by the darkening of leaves. In some plants the leaf pigment change as a result of this process can turn leaves a dark purplish color.

== Detection ==
Detecting phosphorus deficiency can take multiple forms. A preliminary detection method is a visual inspection of plants. Darker green leaves and purplish or red pigment can indicate a deficiency in phosphorus. This method however can be an unclear diagnosis because other plant environment factors can result in similar discoloration symptoms. In commercial or well monitored settings for plants, phosphorus deficiency is diagnosed by scientific testing. Additionally, discoloration in plant leaves only occurs under fairly severe phosphorus deficiency so it is beneficial to planters and farmers to scientifically check phosphorus levels before discoloration occurs. The most prominent method of checking phosphorus levels is by soil testing. The major soil testing methods are Bray 1-P, Mehlich 3, and Olsen methods. Each of these methods are viable but each method has tendencies to be more accurate in known geographical areas. These tests use chemical solutions to extract phosphorus from the soil. The extract must then be analyzed to determine the concentration of the phosphorus. Colorimetry is used to determine this concentration. With the addition of the phosphorus extract into a colorimeter, there is visual color change of the solution and the degree to this color change is an indicator of phosphorus concentration. To apply this testing method on phosphorus deficiency, the measured phosphorus concentration must be compared to known values. Most plants have established and thoroughly tested optimal soil conditions. If the concentration of phosphorus measured from the colorimeter test is significantly lower than the plant's optimal soil levels, then it is likely the plant is phosphorus deficient. The soil testing with colorimetric analysis, while widely used, can be subject to diagnostic problems as a result of interference from other present compounds and elements. Additional phosphorus detection methods such as spectral radiance and inductively coupled plasma spectrometry (ICP) are also implemented with the goal of improving reading accuracy. According to the World Congress of Soil Scientists, the advantages of these light-based measurement methods are their quickness of evaluation, simultaneous measurements of plant nutrients, and their non-destructive testing nature. Although these methods have experimental based evidence, unanimous approval of the methods has not yet been achieved.

== Treatment ==
Correction and prevention of phosphorus deficiency typically involves increasing the levels of available phosphorus into the soil. Planters add phosphorus into soil with bone meal, rock phosphate, manure, and phosphate-fertilizers. Introducing these compounds into soil however does not ensure the alleviation of phosphorus deficiency. There must be phosphorus in the soil, but the plant must also absorb the phosphorus. Phosphorus uptake is limited by the chemical form of the phosphorus. A large portion of phosphorus in soil is in chemical compounds that plants can't absorb. Phosphorus must be present in soil in specific chemical arrangements to be usable as plant nutrients. Facilitation of usable phosphorus in soil can be optimized by maintaining soil within a specified pH range. Soil acidity, measured on the pH scale, partly dictates what chemical arrangements that phosphorus forms. Between pH 6 and 7, phosphorus makes the fewest bonds which render the nutrient unusable to plants. At this range of acidity the likeliness of phosphorus uptake is increased and the likeliness of phosphorus deficiency is decreased. Another part of prevention and treatment of phosphorus is the plant's disposition to absorb nutrients. Plant species and different plants within a species react differently to low levels of phosphorus in soil. Greater expansion of root systems generally correlates to greater nutrient uptake. Plants within a species that have larger roots are genetically advantaged and less prone to phosphorus deficiency. These plants can be cultivated and bred as a long term phosphorus deficiency prevention method. Along with root size, other root adaptations to low phosphorus, such as mycorrhizal symbioses, have been found to increase nutrient intake. These adaptations to roots work to maintain levels of vital nutrients. In larger commercial agriculture settings, variation of plants to adopt these desirable phosphorus intake adaptations may be a long-term phosphorus deficiency correction method.
