= Boron deficiency (plant disorder) =

Nutritional disorder in plants

Boron deficiency is a common deficiency of the micronutrient boron in plants. It is the most widespread micronutrient deficiency around the world and causes large losses in crop production and crop quality. Boron deficiency affects vegetative and reproductive growth of plants, resulting in inhibition of cell expansion, death of meristem, and reduced fertility.

Plants contain boron both in a water-soluble and insoluble form. In intact plants, the amount of water-soluble boron fluctuates with the amount of boron supplied, while insoluble boron does not. The appearzance of boron deficiency coincides with the decrease of water-insoluble boron. It appears that the insoluble boron is the functional form while the soluble boron represents the surplus.

Boron is essential for the growth of higher plants. The primary function of the element is to provide structural integrity to the cell wall in plants. Other functions likely include the maintenance of the plasma membrane and other metabolic pathways.

== Symptoms ==
Symptoms include dying growing tips and bushy, stunted growth; extreme cases may prevent fruit set. Crop-specific symptoms include:

- Apple - interacting with calcium, may display as "water core", internal areas appearing frozen
- Beetroot - rough, cankered patches on roots, internal brown rot.
- Cabbage - distorted leaves, hollow areas in stems.
- Cauliflower - poor development of curds, and brown patches. Stems, leafstalks and midribs roughened.
- Celery - leaf stalks develop cracks on the upper surface, inner tissue is reddish brown.
- Celeriac - causes brown heart rot.
- Mango - fruits show internal lesions and cracking
- Pears - new shoots die back in spring, fruits develop hard brown flecks in the skin.
- Strawberries - Stunted growth, foliage small, yellow and puckered at tips. Fruits are small and pale.
- Swede (rutabaga) and turnip - brown or gray concentric rings develop inside the roots.
- Arecaceae (Palm Tree) - brown spots on fronds & lower productivity.

== Soil conditions ==
Boron is present in the soil in many forms, the most common being boric acid (H_{3}BO_{3}). An adequate amount of boron in the soil is typically in a range of 0.5 to 1.0 mg/kg, with deficiency commonly observed below a threshold of 0.2 to 0.5 mg/kg depending on crop and soil type.

Boron deficiency is also observed in basic soils with a high pH because in basic conditions boric acid exists in an undissociated form which the plant is unable to absorb. Soils with low organic matter content (<1.5%) are also susceptible to boron deficiency. Highly leached sandy soils are also characteristic of boron deficiency because the boron will not be retained in the soil. Boron toxicity is also possible if the boron content of the soil is high enough that the plant cannot cope with the excess boron. The levels at which boron is toxic to plants varies with different species of plants.

== Soil types ==
Several distinct soil types exhibit heightened vulnerability to boron deficiency due to their physical, chemical, and mineralogical properties:

- Sandy and light-textured soils: Low cation exchange capacity and limited organic matter allow soluble boron to leach beyond the root zone during rainfall or irrigation.
- Low organic matter soils: Organic matter acts as both reservoir and buffer for boron; soils with low organic carbon have smaller labile boron pools, increasing deficiency risk

More specifically such soils are:

- Highly weathered tropical soils (Acrisols, Ferralsols): Intense weathering and low organic matter reduce plant-available boron and increase vulnerability to seasonal shortfalls. Extensive leaching over geological timescales depletes native boron reserves.
- Podzols and Andosols: Podzolic soils sorb or fix boron through interactions with aluminum and iron oxides; volcanic ash-derived Andosols may lose boron through leaching or retain it in forms unavailable to plants despite adequate total boron concentrations.
- Calcareous alkaline soils: High CaCO₃ content reduces available boron through precipitation reactions with calcium and adsorption onto carbonate surfaces. Field surveys in Pakistan documented 35 to 56% of fields affected.

== Global regions most susceptible to B deficiency ==
Boron deficiency is a widespread agricultural concern, but certain global regions are particularly affected due to their predominant soil types, climate, and geological history.

South and Southeast Asia are among the most severely affected regions. In Bangladesh, widespread boron deficiency has been documented across floodplain soils, where sandy alluvial deposits and intensive cropping deplete available boron. In Pakistan, field surveys of calcareous alkaline soils have found 35 to 56 percent of agricultural fields to be boron deficient. Parts of eastern India, Nepal, and China (particularly acidic red soils in the south) also report significant boron deficiency in rice, wheat, and oilseed crops.

Sub-Saharan Africa faces extensive boron deficiency linked to highly weathered Ferralsols and Acrisols that have undergone intense leaching over geological timescales. Countries across West Africa and East Africa report low soil boron levels affecting cereal and legume production.

In South America, the Cerrado region of Brazil is particularly vulnerable due to its acidic, highly weathered Oxisols with low organic matter content. Boron deficiency is a recognized constraint for soybean, eucalyptus, and coffee cultivation in these soils.

Northern and Western Europe experience boron deficiency primarily in leached sandy and podzolic soils, particularly in Scandinavia, the Baltic states, and parts of the United Kingdom. These soils have low cation exchange capacity and organic matter, leading to boron leaching under high rainfall conditions.

Arid and semi-arid regions with calcareous soils, such as parts of the Middle East, northern Africa, and the Mediterranean Basin, also exhibit boron deficiency. Although total soil boron may be adequate, high soil pH and calcium carbonate content reduce plant-available boron through adsorption and precipitation reactions.

== Boron requirements ==
Boron is an essential micronutrient, which means it is essential for plant growth and development, but is required in very small quantities. Although Boron requirements vary among crops, the optimum boron content of the leaves for most crops is 20-100 ppm. Excess boron can result in boron toxicity and the toxicity level varies between plants.

== Treatment ==
Boric acid (16.5% boron), borax (11.3% boron) or Solubor (20.5% boron) can be applied to soils to correct boron deficiency. Typical applications of actual boron are about 1.1 kg/hectare or 1.0 lb/acre but optimum levels of boron vary with plant type. Borax, Boric Acid or Solubor can be dissolved in water and sprayed or applied to soil in blended dry fertilizer. Excess boron is toxic to plants so care must be taken to ensure correct application rate and even coverage. While boron may be sprayed on leaves, excess will cause plant damage. Application of boron may not correct boron deficiency in alkaline soils because even with the addition of boron, it may remain unavailable for plant absorption. Continued application of boron may be necessary in soils that are susceptible to leaching such as sandy soils. Flushing soils containing toxic levels of boron with water can remove the boron through leaching.

A boron-containing granular potash fertilizer, called Aspire, has been developed to evenly distribute boron through potassium chloride granules. This product contains two forms of boron - sodium borate for quick release and calcium borate for gradual release - to ensure season-long boron availability. These boron-infused potash granules prevent localized boron toxicity, while the granular size allows it to be distributed by common fertilizer equipment along with typical granular NPK fertilizer blends.

== Functions ==
Once boron has been absorbed by the plant and incorporated into the various structures that require boron, the plant is unable to disassemble these structures and re-transport boron through the plant resulting in boron being a non-mobile nutrient. Due to translocation difficulties the youngest leaves often show deficiency symptoms first.

=== Cell wall ===
Boron is part of the dRG-II-B complex which is involved in the cross linking for pectin located in the primary cell wall and the middle lamella of plant cells. This cross linking is thought to stabilize the matrix of plant cell walls.

=== Enhances protein synthesis ===
Boron plays a role in the synthesis of protein in plants, although the precise mechanisms are not fully understood. Boron deficiency has been associated with reduced RNA levels and impaired ribonuclease activity in plant tissues, suggesting a link between boron availability and nucleic acid metabolism. Studies have shown that boron-deficient plants exhibit decreased incorporation of amino acids into proteins, particularly in actively dividing meristematic tissues. Boron is thought to influence protein synthesis indirectly through its structural role in cell wall integrity, which affects cellular signaling and gene expression pathways. Additionally, adequate boron supply has been linked to improved nitrogen metabolism and enhanced nitrate uptake, both of which are critical for amino acid and protein biosynthesis in plants.

=== Germination and pollination ===
The B requirement is much higher for reproductive growth than for vegetative growth in most plant species. Boron increases flower production and retention, pollen tube elongation and germination, and seed and fruit development.

A deficiency of B can cause incomplete pollination of corn or prevent maximum pod-set in soybeans.

=== Sugar translocation ===
Photosynthesis transforms sunlight energy into plant energy compounds such as sugars. For this process to continue in plants, the sugars must be moved away from the site of their development, and stored or used to make other compounds.

Boron increases the rate of transport of sugars (which are produced by photosynthesis in mature plant leaves) to actively growing regions and also in developing fruits. Boron is essential for providing sugars which are needed for root growth in all plants and also for normal development of root nodules in legumes such as alfalfa, soybeans and peanuts.
