= Index of organic food articles =

This is a list of organic food topics. Organic foods are foods that are produced using methods of organic farming – that do not involve modern synthetic inputs such as synthetic pesticides and chemical fertilizers. Organic foods are also not processed using irradiation, industrial solvents, or chemical food additives.

== Organic food topics ==
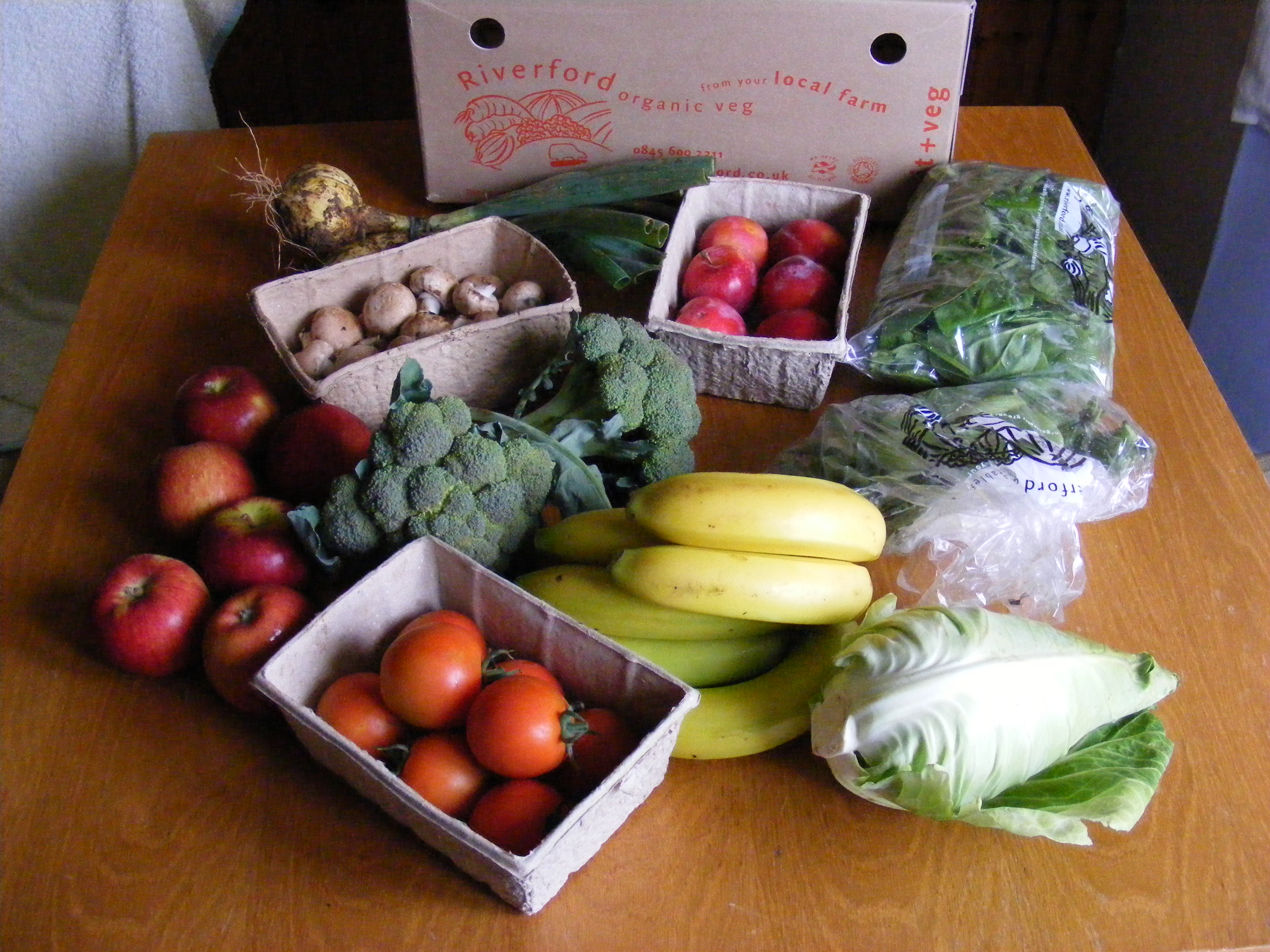
Organic fruits and vegetables

=== 0-9 ===
- 4th Street Food Co-op

=== A ===
- Alb-Leisa
- Animal, Vegetable, Miracle: A Year of Food Life
- Amy's Kitchen
- Annie's Homegrown

=== B ===
- Bloom Agro

=== C ===
- Central Market (Texas)
- Certified Naturally Grown
- Choices Market

=== D ===
- Dancing Deer Baking Co.

=== E ===
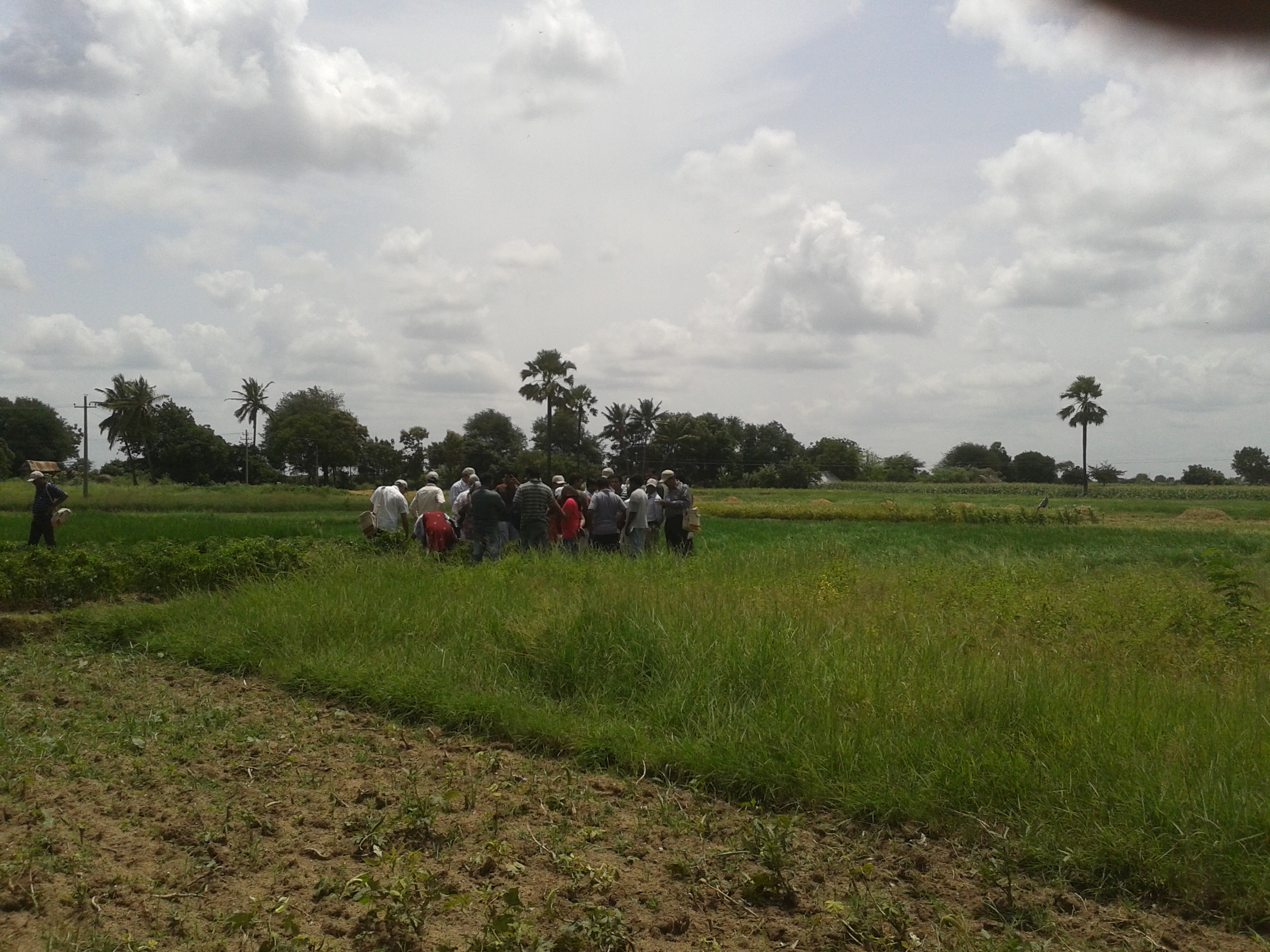
Scientists from Directorate of Rice Research (DRR) visiting crop fields in Enabavi

- Earth Fare
- ECOCERT
- Eden Foods Inc.
- Enabavi
- Erewhon Organic Cereal
- EU-Eco-regulation

=== G ===
- George Street Co-op
- Green & Black's

=== H ===
- Happy Family (food company)
- Health food store

=== I ===
- Irish Organic Farmers and Growers Association

=== J ===
- Jordans (company)

=== K ===
- Kallø

=== L ===
- List of organic gardening and farming topics
- Lotus Foods

=== M ===
- Organic milk

=== N ===
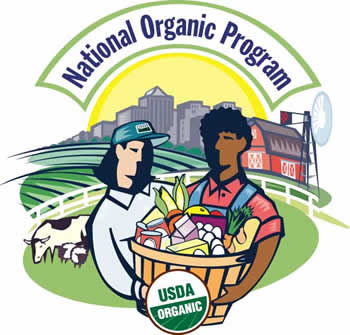
Logo for the U.S. National Organic Program

- National Organic Program
- National Organic Standards Board
- Natural food
- Nature's Path
- Restaurant Nora
- Northland Organic Foods Corporation
- Numi Organic Tea

=== O ===
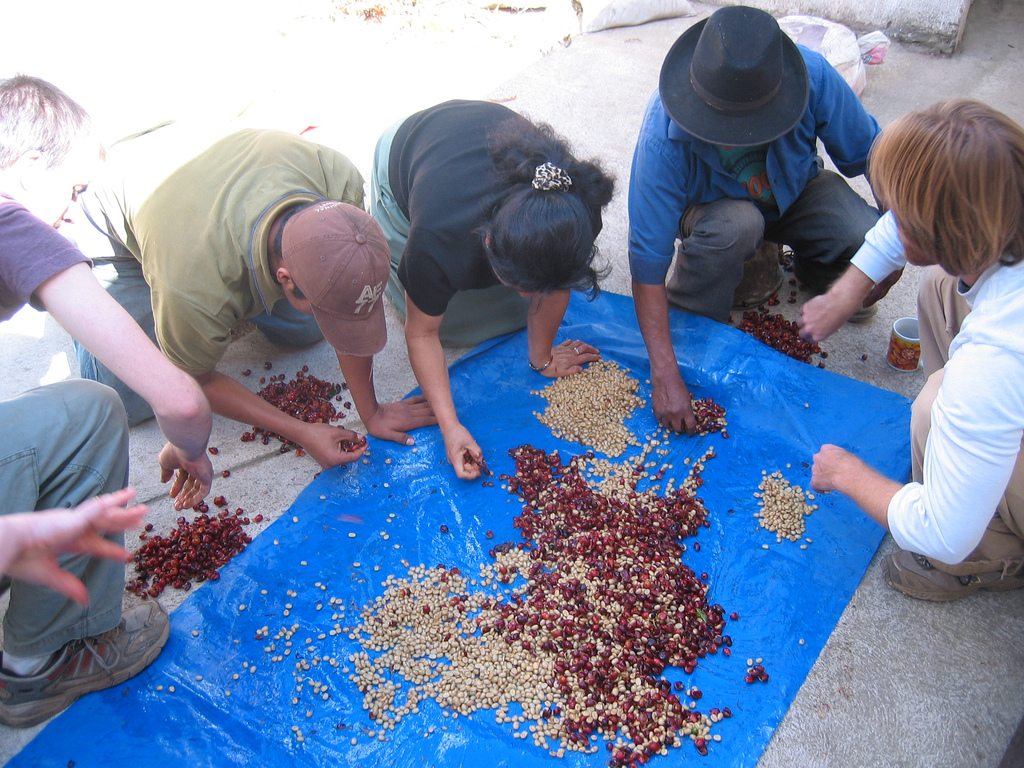
Organic coffee beans being sorted and pulped by workers and volunteers, on an organic, fair-trade, shade-grown coffee plantation in Guatemala

- Organic aquaculture
- Organic beef
- Organic certification
- Organic coffee
- Organic farming
- Organic Farming Digest
- Organic food
- Organic Food Development Center
- Organic Foods Production Act of 1990
- Organic horticulture
- Organic infant formula
- Organic livestock farming
- Organic movement
- Organic Trade Association
- Organic Valley
- Organic wild
- Organically Grown Company
- Organic food culture

=== P ===
- PCC Natural Markets
- People's Food Co-op (Portland)
- Plum Baby
- Price-Pottenger Nutrition Foundation

=== Q ===
- Quality Assurance International

=== R ===
- Rachel's Organic
- Rainbow Grocery Cooperative

=== S ===
- Soil Association
- Soil conditioner
- Soil steam sterilization
- Sprouts Farmers Market
- Square One Organic Vodka
- Stonyfield Farm
- SunOpta

=== T ===
- The Fresh Market
- Theo Chocolate

=== U ===
- United Natural Foods

=== V ===
- Vegan organic gardening
- Vegetable box scheme

=== W ===
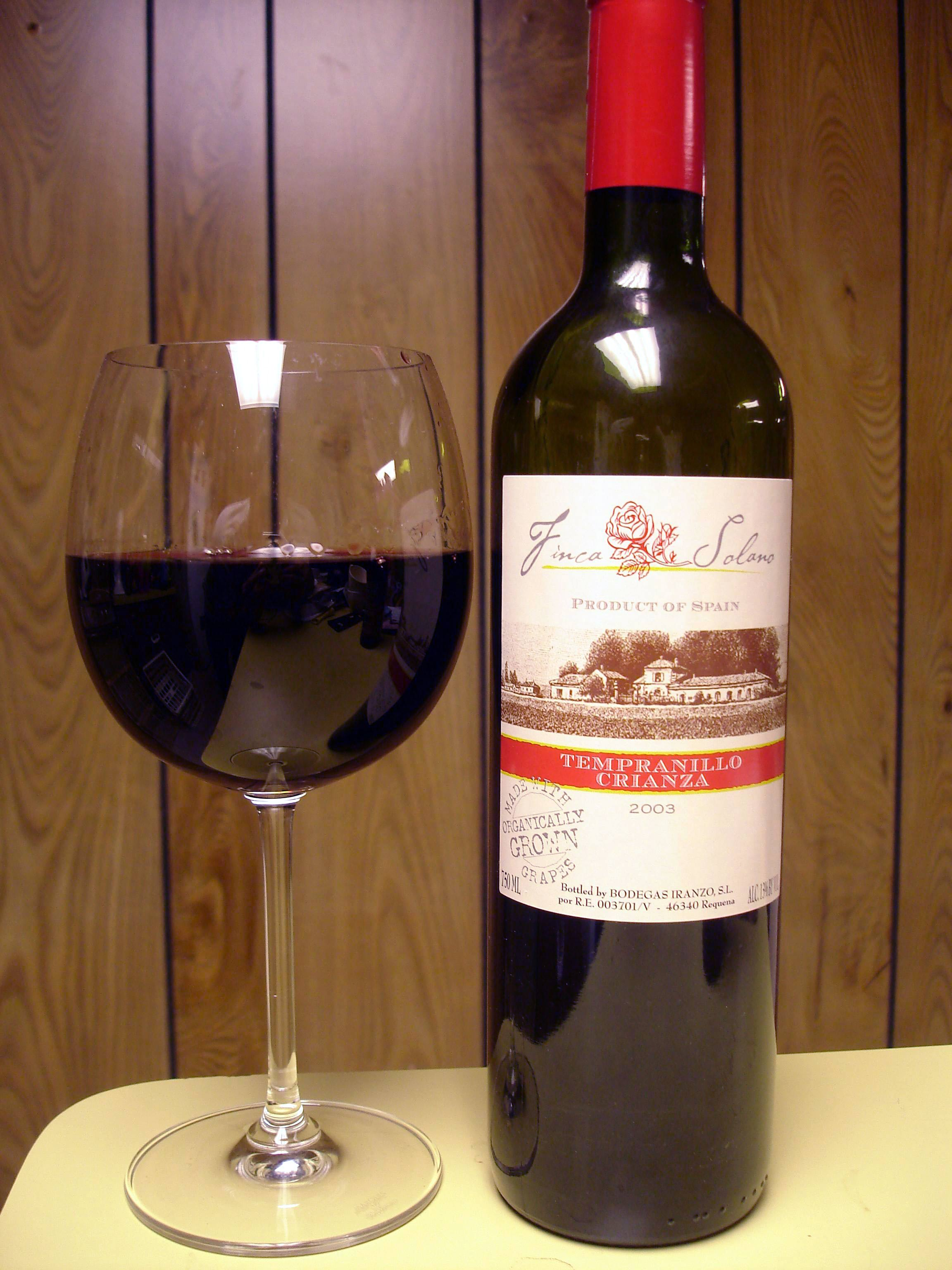
Organic wine

- Weaver Street Market
- Wedge Community Co-op
- Weston A. Price Foundation
- Whole Foods Co-op
- Whole Foods Market
- Wild Oats Markets
- Willy Street Cooperative
- Wine (organic)

=== Y ===
- Ypsilanti Food Co-op

== See also ==
- Health food
- List of foods
- Non-GMO Project
- Specialty foods
