= Agriculturist =

Professional in agriculture management

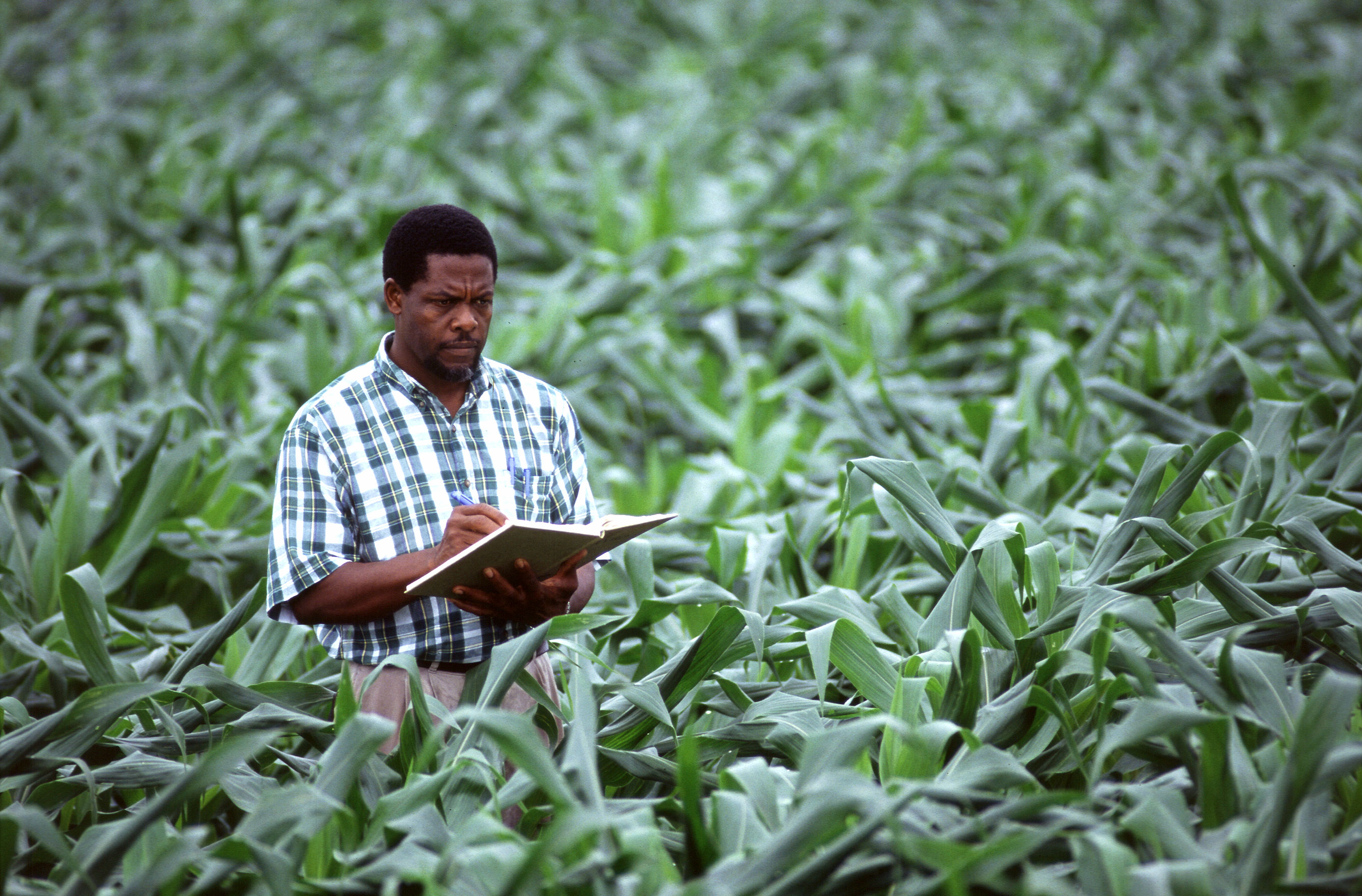
- An agriculturist performing a checkup on crops

Occupation
- Names: Agriculturist, agrologist, agronomist, agricultural scientist
- Occupation type: Profession

Description
- Competencies: Farming, biology, business, economics, environmental planning
- Education required: Agriculture degree (BS)
- Fields of employment: Agribusiness enterprises, farming enterprises, agriculture schools, government offices
- Related jobs: Farmer, farm worker, agricultural engineer

An agriculturist, agriculturalist, agrologist, or agronomist (abbreviated as agr.) is a professional in the science, practice, and management of agriculture and agribusiness. It is a regulated profession in Canada, the United States, the European Union, Pakistan, India, Japan and the Philippines. Other names used to designate the profession include agricultural scientist, agricultural manager, agricultural planner, agriculture researcher, or agriculture policy maker.

The primary role of agriculturists are in leading agricultural projects and programs, usually in agri business planning or research for the benefit of farms, food, and agribusiness-related organizations. Agriculturists usually are designated in the government as public agriculturists serving as agriculture policymakers or technical advisors for policy making. Agriculturists can also provide technical advice for farmers and farm workers such as in making crop calendars and workflows to optimize farm production, tracing agricultural market channels, prescribing fertilizers and pesticides to avoid misuse, and in aligning for organic accreditation or the national agricultural quality standards.

Preparation of technical engineering designs and construction for agriculture meanwhile are reserved for agricultural engineers. Agriculturists may pursue environmental planning and focus on agricultural and rural planning.

== Responsibilities ==
Agriculturists are science based consultants with major fields of specialization including agribusiness management, crop science, agricultural extension, agriculture economics, development communication, animal science, soil science, food technology, crop protection, agricultural biotechnology, agricultural policy, and environmental science.

In modern practice, agriculturists are expected to be proficient in digital agriculture such as the use of geographic information systems, artificial intelligence, and remote sensing for better agricultural planning.

Agriculturists of today are involved with many issues, including producing food, creating healthier food, managing the environmental impact of agriculture, distribution of agriculture, recreation surfaces (sports fields, golf courses, and parks), and extracting energy from plants.

Agriculturists often specialize in food and agriculture research areas such as crop rotation, irrigation and drainage, plant breeding, plant physiology, soil classification, soil fertility, weed control, turfgrass and insect and pest control.

Professional agriculturists may provide advice directly to farmers, vineyards, agricultural corporations, municipal and provincial governments, the fertilizer and seeds sector, consult on food processing, advise on range management, turf management and golf course operations, assess and provide remedial recommendations for brown lands (contaminated sites), watersheds, among many different areas of practice.

== Asia ==
=== China ===
In the People's Republic of China, the professional designation is agricultural technician (农业技术员, nóngyè jìshùyuán). These professionals operate within a state-led agricultural extension system coordinated by the Ministry of Agriculture and Rural Affairs (MARA) and are primarily appointed at the county or township level by local government agencies.

Due to the competitive nature of public service employment, individuals who aspire to hold permanent positions within the civil service must pass the National Civil Service Exam (公务员考试). In addition to passing this exam, candidates are required to have completed a degree in agriculture or a closely related field and highly-intricate training programs to be eligible for appointment as public agricultural officers.

=== India ===
In India, the professional designation is Agricultural Scientist (abbreviated as ARS). To qualify for entry level posts, the Agricultural Scientists Recruitment Board conducts competitive examinations pursuant to the Gajendragadkar Report of 1972. The post of entry level ARS is same with Jr. Class I cadre of Central government. The initial pay is fixed after granting advance increments for higher qualification, with PhDs getting the highest salary.

They are kept on 'tenure track' or 'probation' for two years and upon satisfactory completion of this period they are given tenure and confirmed in the ARS. On completing service for designated years and meeting set performance criteria, they are promoted to the next higher grades in a flexible complementation system known as Career Advancement Scheme (CAS).

Incumbents without a PhD degree are given paid study leave to acquire PhD qualification, which is necessary for career progression. Through CAS, scientists can rise up to principal scientist grade, which is equivalent to the scale of joint secretary to the Government of India. The ARS encourages fresh infusion of talent at all senior levels through lateral entry in which incumbent scientists can participate in the open competition and move their career ahead in much shorter time than CAS. All the research management positions are filled through open competition. The director general of ICAR is the highest-ranked member of the ARS, who is ex officio secretary to the Government of India, Department of Agricultural Research and Education (DARE), Ministry of Agriculture.

=== Japan ===
In Japan, the professional designation is agricultural extension officer (農業指導士, Nōgyō Shidōshi) by virtue of the Agricultural Improvement Promotion Act. One must typically hold a degree in agriculture or a related field, accumulate years of practical technical experience, pass a national qualification exam, and then be appointed by a prefectural government, as guided by standards from the Ministry of Agriculture, Forestry and Fisheries (MAFF). These officers deliver technical advice, promote good agricultural practices, assist with compliance in programs like the Certified Farm Manager initiative (農業経営士), and support technology transfer to local farmers.

Meanwhile Certified Farm Manager (農業経営士, Nōgyō Keieishi), a designation formally awarded through a combination of academic credentials, government-administered training, certification programs, and skills assessments from the Japan Agricultural Cooperatives and that are aligned with the Japanese Agricultural Standards of the Ministry of Agriculture, Forestry and Fisheries (MAFF).

=== Philippines ===
In the Philippines, the official professional designation is Registered Agriculturist (R.Agr.) by virtue of the Philippine Agriculturist Act of 2025 or Republic Act No. 12215. Prior to the enactment of the law, the profession has already been regulated by the Professional Regulation Commission and the Professional Board of Agriculture by virtue of Republic Act No. 8435 or Agriculture and Fisheries Modernization Act of 1997, which mentioned:

Section 75. Agriculture and Fisheries Board. - There shall be created an Agriculture and Fisheries Board in the Professional Regulation Commission to upgrade the Agriculture and Fisheries profession. Those who have not passed the Civil Service Examination for Fisheries and Agriculture but have served the industry in either private or public capacity for not less than five (5) years shall be automatically granted eligibility by the Board of Examiners. The first board of examination for B.S. Fisheries and/or Agriculture Graduates shall be conducted within one (1) year from the approval of this Act.

A Registered Agriculturist can affix the title "R.Agr." (as name suffix) or "Agr." (as name prefix) to indicate the profession. The Professional Board of Agriculture was created and established in 2000 by virtue of PRC Resolution No. 2000-663 and the first Agriculturist Licensure Examination (ALE) was held in 2003 and has annually been held annually.

==== Professional Practice of Agriculturists ====
Registered Agriculturists ("RAgr") are authorized to perform services related to:

- Crop, livestock, and poultry production, processing and marketing
- Soil, crop, and animal health management
- Consultancy, feasibility planning and cost estimation services
- Breeding, research, pest & disease control, and extension work
- Training, technology transfer, and agricultural education
- Marketing and agribusiness management
- Teaching agricultural subjects in recognized institutions
- Employment in private and government roles requiring professional agricultural knowledge

Similar to other professions in the Philippines, malpractice and illegal practice of agriculture are grounds for suspension or revocation of certificates of registration and professional licenses. Licensed agriculturists in the Philippines are integrated into one accredited integrated professional organization, which is the Philippine Association of Agriculturists. Penalties

A separate registry system for farmers, fisherfolk, and agri-youth was established by the Department of Agriculture through the Registry System for Basic Sectors in Agriculture (RSBSA).

==== Eligibility to take the Board Exam ====
A prospective professional agriculturist is typically required to have a four-year Bachelor of Science degree in Agriculture, although other degree programs directly related to agriculture are also allowed to take the licensure examination if they earn at least twenty-seven units of fundamental agriculture credits from a recognized higher education institution. About 5,500 registered agriculturists pass the licensure examination annually. It is one of the hardest licensure examinations in the country with 29.84% passing rate in November 2021.

Professionals and educators with at least five years of experience in agriculture are allowed to be registered as an Agriculturist without taking the licensure examination.

== Europe ==
=== European Union ===
In the European Union, the generic name of the profession is Agronomist/Agricultural Engineer. The profession is exercised for the public interest in defense of the principles of the Charter of Fundamental Rights of the European Union and Directive 2005/36/EC.

==== Italy ====
In Italy, the professional designation is "Dottori Agronomi" (translated as Agronomy Doctor). The profession is exercised for the public interest in defense of the principles of Articles 9 and 32 of the Italian Constitution and of the Charter of Fundamental Rights of the European Union. Professionals enrolled in the Register of Dottori Agronomi while exercising the profession base their actions on the following principles:

- Contribute to the integrated and sustainable development through the planning and design compatible with the conservation of biodiversity;
- Ensure and promote the quality of food for animal feed and animal welfare;
- Ensure the safety and promote the quality of food products for the protection of the business system and the health and well-being of the consumer;
- Promote and enhance the landscapes and cultures of rural communities;
- Qualify and enhance urban ecosystems and the development of plant and animal heritage and biodiversity.

== North America ==
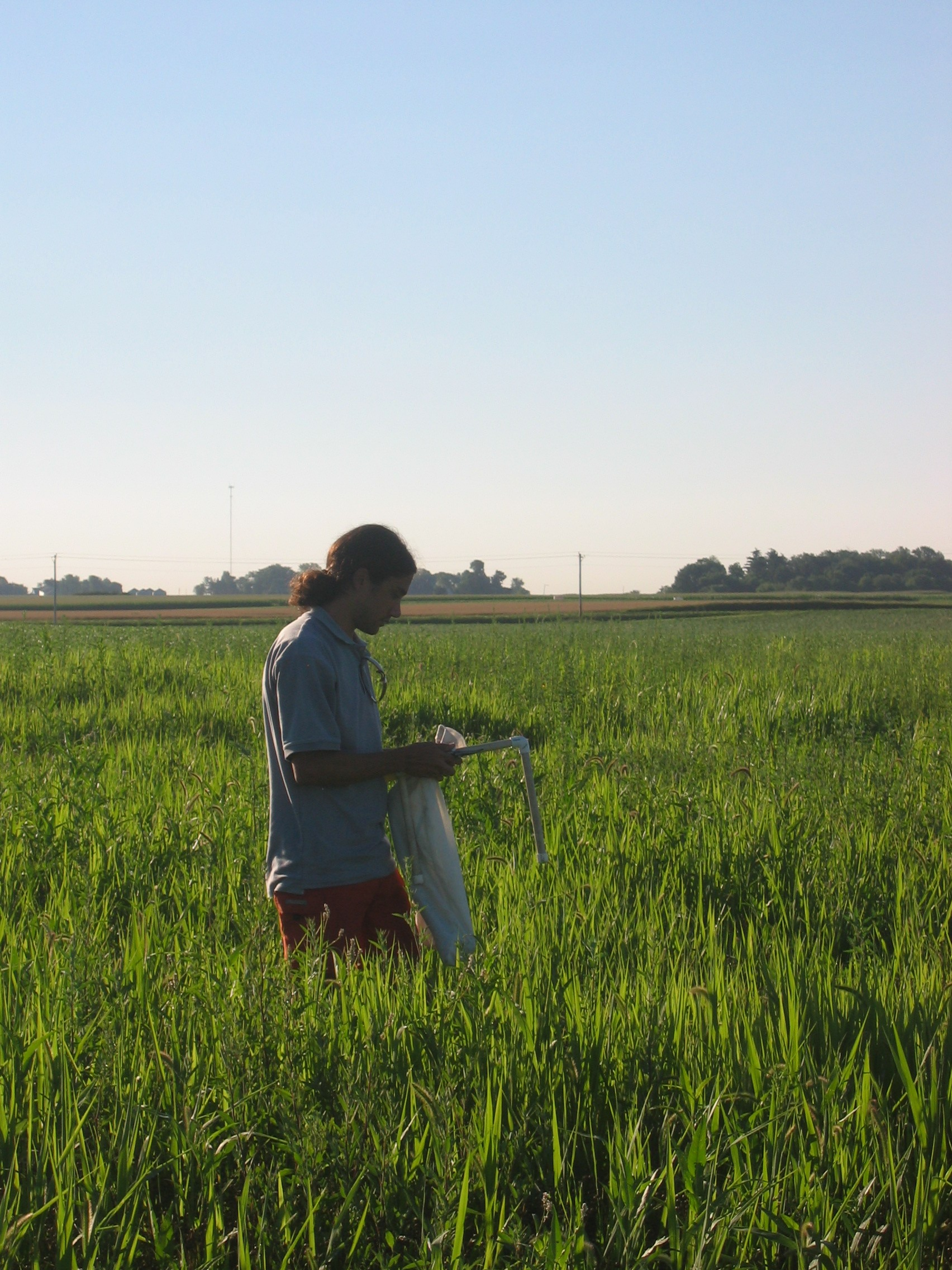
An agronomist field sampling a trial plot of flax

=== Canada ===
In Canada, the professional designation is "agrologist", also called "agronome" in Québec. There are more than 10,000 professional agrologists and agronomes in Canada.

Professional agrologists are accredited through provincial regulatory bodies, e.g. Saskatchewan Institute of Agrology, Nova Scotia Institute of Agrologists. The requirements to attain professional designation (PAg) are similar in each province. A prospective agrologist is typically required to have a four-year undergraduate science degree directly related to agrology. If accepted by their provincial institute, the applicant is known as an articling agrologist (AAg) or agrologist-in-training (AIT) and must complete a two-year educational and mentorship program before being considered for a professional designation.

An alternative certification called "registered technical agrologist" (RTag), or (PTag) is also available, requiring a two-year college or university education in the agricultural sciences instead of a four-year degree. These technologists designations require a two-year mentorship and education program, and participate in the same mentorship processes as a professional agrologist.

=== United States ===
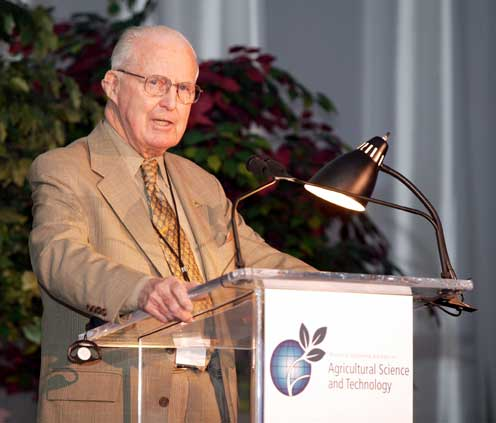
Norman Borlaug, father of the Green Revolution

In the United States, the professional designation is Certified Professional Agronomist (abbreviated C.PAg), the American Society of Agronomy is the regulatory organization responsible for certification. The American Society of Agronomy uses a sliding scale of education and experience to determine certification: it is required to have either a bachelor's degree in science and 5 years work experience, a master's degree related to agrology and 3 years work experience, or a Doctorate related to agrology and a single year of work experience. CPAgs are required to complete at least 50 hours of continuing education through the American Society of Agronomy every two years in order to retain their certification.

The American Society of Agronomy also provides certifications for Certified Crop Advisors (CCA). To become a Certified Crop Adviser an applicant must pass two exams that may both be written on the same day at the same location. The International exam is written by CCAs in North America. The Prairie region exam is written by individuals wishing to work as advisers in the three Prairie provinces of Canada or in the heartland states of the US.

== See also ==
- Agriculture
- Agronomy
- Agricultural science
- Agricultural engineering
- Horticulture
- Animal science
- Botany
- Forestry
- Aquaculture
