= Organic coffee =

Coffee produced without artificial chemicals

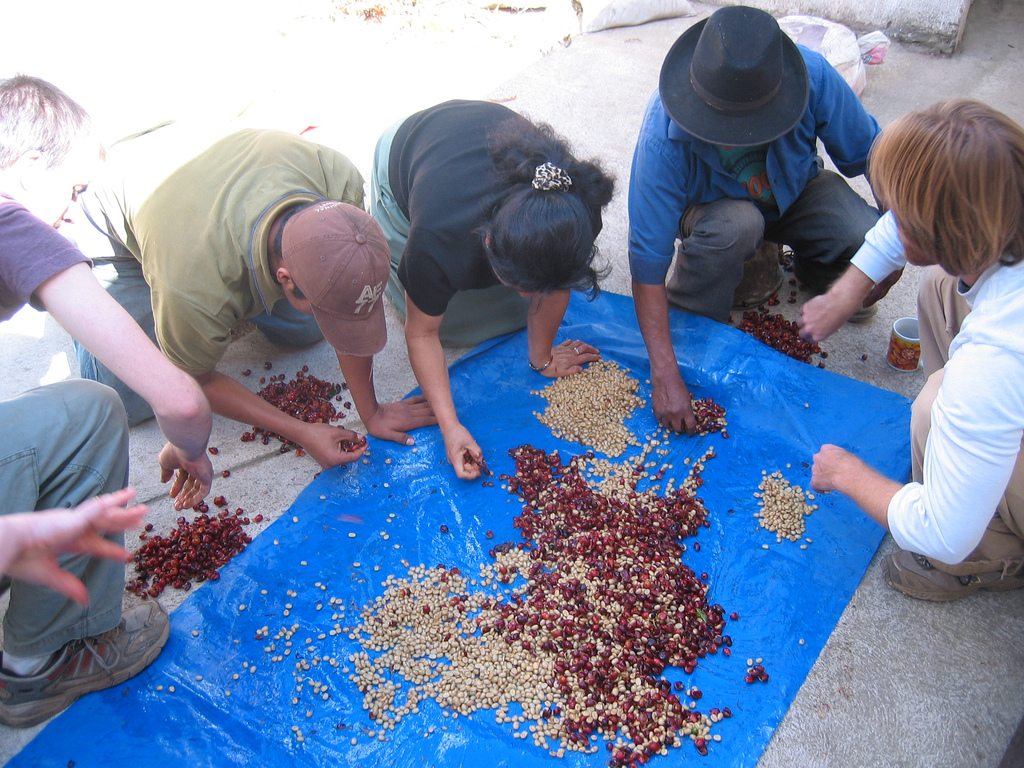
Coffee beans being sorted and pulped by workers and volunteers, on an organic, fair-trade, shade-grown coffee plantation in Guatemala

Organic coffee is coffee produced without the aid of artificial chemical substances, such as certain additives or some pesticides and herbicides.

Several organizations have established standards for the certification of organic coffee production. In the U.S the USDA Agricultural Marketing Service oversees certification through the National Organic Program, which regulates the labeling of organic products sold in the country. At an international level, the FAO/WHO Codex Alimentarius Commission provides guidelines for the production, processing, labeling and marketing of organically produced foods including coffee.

== Meaning of organic ==
Many factors are taken into consideration when coffee is considered for organic certification. For example, the coffee farm's fertilizer must be 100% organic. Some organic fertilizer options include chicken manure, coffee pulp, bocachi and general compost. If inorganic fertilizers such as synthetic nitrogen, phosphate, and potash are used, then the crop grown cannot be certified organic.

In the US, organic coffee crops are overseen by the United States Department of Agriculture (USDA). Although these standards discourage the use of chemicals on cropland within three years preceding the harvest in question, exemptions can be made. This means that not all USDA certified organic products are necessarily free of chemical residues.

Meanwhile, the Organic Food Production Act of 1990 (OFPA) focuses on the production of coffee after the harvest. OFPA regulates the use of chemicals on the product and how the coffee beans are handled throughout the production process. Regulations are not necessarily stringent; The former vice-chair of the U.S. National Organic Standards Board has stated that "Organic labels are not statements regarding the healthiness, nutritional value, or overall safety of consuming such products" (Liu 333).

== Organic producers ==
According to the center for Tropical Agricultural Research and Higher Education in Costa Rica (CATIE), 75% of the world's organic coffee comes from Latin America. In addition, a number of Asian and African countries produce organic coffee, including Indonesia and Ethiopia. As of 2010, Peru was the leading exporter of organic coffee, with over 423,000 bags exported that year. Honduras and Mexico each produce over 100,000 bags annually. Other large producers include Brazil, Colombia, El Salvador, and Guatemala.

Organic coffee production is generally on the rise in Latin America. As of 2010, about 10% of one-time organic growers had given in to conventional production due to price competition. However, this trend is reversing as consumers increasingly demand organic goods and investors step in to supply loans with manageable interest rates.

To be sold as organic in the U.S., imported coffee must gain organic certification. Among other standards, this includes meeting the following requirements:

- The coffee is grown on land that wasn't exposed to synthetic pesticides or other prohibited substances for 3 years prior.
- A sufficient buffer exists between the organic coffee and the closest conventional crop.
- A sustainable crop rotation plan is in place to prevent erosion, the depletion of soil nutrients, and to naturally control for pests.

== Effects of organic coffee on the environment ==
Organic agriculture can strengthen the natural environment's resistance to disease. For example, coffee of this standard is generally shade-grown, a quality that promotes forest preservation. Other benefits of this process include the minimization of soil erosion and participation in a healthy ecosystem. Bird populations develop mutually beneficial relationships with coffee fields, enjoying the habitat while keeping insect populations under control and naturally fertilizing the soil.

Shade use and reforestation are aspects of the organic agricultural production of coffee that promotes healthy environmental effects. Due to the influence of these factors on climate vulnerability and carbon stocks, there are collaboration aspects that align with climate change adaptation and mitigation. Afforestation in areas high in coffee agroforestry has shown positive results, including finance possibilities through carbon offsetting, insetting, and footprint reductions. Technical assistance and capacity building are other low-cost benefits that help bolster this collaboration.

== Small-scale farming ==
Small-scale farming can have a significant impact on soil remediation. Organic coffee helps soils even though, "1/3 [of] farmers had problems obtaining organic fertilizer[s]". Many would-be organic farmers lack the funding to establish environmentally friendly fertilizers to help their coffee grow at competitive rates. The prices that farmers get for their coffee may vary drastically (3021).

== Organic fertilizers ==
Organic fertilizers are a significant factor in dictating whether coffee can be certified organic. Organic fertilizers can reduce soil erosion and increase fertility by lowering bulk density. This means that farmers are not only growing healthy coffee, but they are putting vital nutrients back into their soils to help the next crop. The coffee plant has a vital nutrient it produces – coffee pulp. Coffee pulp is the outside of the plant that can be salvaged and returned to the soil as an organic fertilizer. Nitrogen, phosphorus, and potassium are the major nutrients that coffee plants need so by using the coffee pulp, cattle manure, bocachi and compost, and chicken manure and biogreen, farmers are able to supply those essential nutrients to the plant cheaper.

Prices of organic fertilizers vary widely. Because transportation costs are usually a primary hindrance, sourcing nearby fertilizers is almost essential for success. Organic fertilizers are cheaper in the long run because they replenish lost nutrients in the soil and thus help future generation organic coffee plants.

The problem with organic fertilizers is that "there is poor synchronization of nutrient availability and crop demand, as organic fertilizers release their nutrients slowly and not necessarily at the times when nutrients are required by crops". This means that growing organic coffee is slower because the nutrients take time to release, thus slowing the growth rate of the plant. Using inorganic fertilizers permits faster growth of plants because it is modified to sustain a larger yield. Inorganic fertilizers must be bought, brought onto the farm, as opposed to say recycled manure of cattle or chicken. Even though it must be bought, farmers are able to use less inorganic fertilizer because it is more concentrated than organic, but in the long run organic helps the soils and is healthier. Even though organic fertilizers are less expensive than inorganic, consumers see a higher price with organic coffee. Environmentally-conscious consumers may be willing to pay this premium.

Farmers may opt to combine organic and inorganic fertilizers, which appears to maximize yield on the cultivated lands and thus decrease the need for further farming land expansion

== North America and its consumption of organic coffee ==
The Organic Trade Association reported that organic coffee imports to the United States and Canada dramatically increased by 29% from 29,484 tons to 36,741 tons between the years of 2006 and 2007. Between 2007 and 2008, organic coffee imports increased to 40,370 tons, a growth of 12%. Most of these imports were also sold within the United States and Canada.

Due to organic coffee's higher value (it has the greatest value of any organic import in North America) than that of conventional coffee, it only takes up approximately 3% in volume of North America's coffee market, yet its piece of the market concerning value is slightly greater than that of conventional coffee. Organic coffee accounts for about one-third of all U.S. organic beverage sales.

== Pricing of organic coffee ==
There is a high demand for organic coffee, especially in North America, Western Europe, and Japan, where the demand is higher than the supply. This among the expensive certification are some of the contributing factors to the higher price tag of organic coffee.

The economic factors that affect pricing of organic coffee are questionable to some. There is an argument about a large amount of injustice in the production of organic coffee due to the strenuous work done by those who grow and harvest coffee beans and what the consumer receives. Relating to this, there is also debate surrounding organic farming as a whole. An example of why people do not agree with organic farming, specifically organic coffee farming is grand amounts of organic compost that are required to meet the nutrient requirements.

The higher price tag of organic coffee can be attributed to many varying factors, one of which is ethical concern. A study done in South Korea used the Theory of Planned Behaviour (TPB) to assess what motives were behind the choice of organic coffee and explored the concern for ethics here. The findings of this study showed that consumers purchased with the protection of health and environmental factors in mind.

== See also ==
- Economics of coffee
- Coffea
- List of organic food topics
