= Pollen drift =

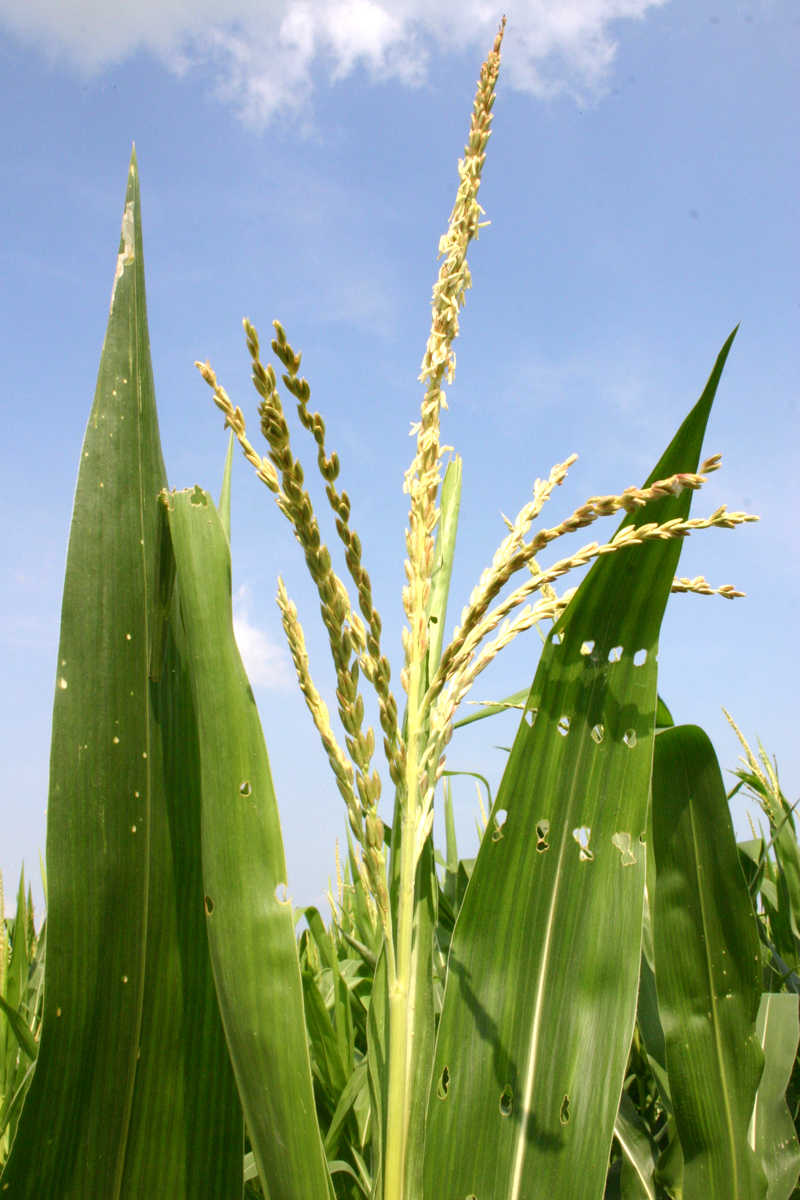
The stamen of a corn plant, showing the pollen.

Pollen drift is the accidental cross-pollination of different varieties of crops through natural dispersal methods. The term is used almost exclusively when referring to strains of corn, and especially refers to the crossing of genetically modified crops with those that are not. For example, farmers who grow specialty crops may wish to preserve their genetic traits, such as an especially high oil content, without compromising the gene pool of the variety. Or, farmers may wish to avoid crossing a particular GMO crop that has been approved for export to a certain country, with non-GMO crops or other varieties of GMO crops that may not have the same approval.

Farmers who produce non-GMO crops and farmers who produce GMO crops for export are the most likely to be affected. Farmers whose non-GMO crops have been contaminated with GMO genes may lose their contracts or the rights to certain labeling. GMO exporters must meet the requirements of other countries, many of whom have stringent import controls regarding GMOs.

Pollen drift can be avoided by careful examination of the geography of the area where the crop is to be grown combined with the study of the nature of the crop's pollen, the distance it can travel and via what methods, and how to plant their fields to avoid unwanted cross-pollination.

== Corn ==
Corn pollen is particularly prone to pollen drift. Corn plants release their pollen for around a week, and an entire field may take up to two weeks to completely release its pollen; pollen release usually shows a spike two to three days after half the plants have released their pollen. Each individual plant can produce 4 to 5 million individual pollen grains. Its pollen is among the largest particles that can be found in the air, and is spherical in its shape. It can drift up to half a mile and remain viable for several days in optimal conditions. These factors all create a considerable possibility for one corn field to cross-pollinate another, even if just a small percentage of the pollen shed by a given field drifts into a different field.

Corn producers can reduce the chance of cross-contamination via pollen drift by separating fields by at least 150 feet (46 m); however, many identity preserved corn programs require that non-GMO fields be separated from GMO corn by a distance of at least 660 feet (200 m). They may also utilize a technique called 'flooding' by surrounding their fields with a border of non-GMO corn, the theory being that these 'border rows' of corn will dilute any outside pollen, thus reducing the risk of cross-contamination. Producers can also alternate planting dates to prevent crops from releasing their pollen at similar times.
