= Organic milk =

Milk produced according to organic farming methods

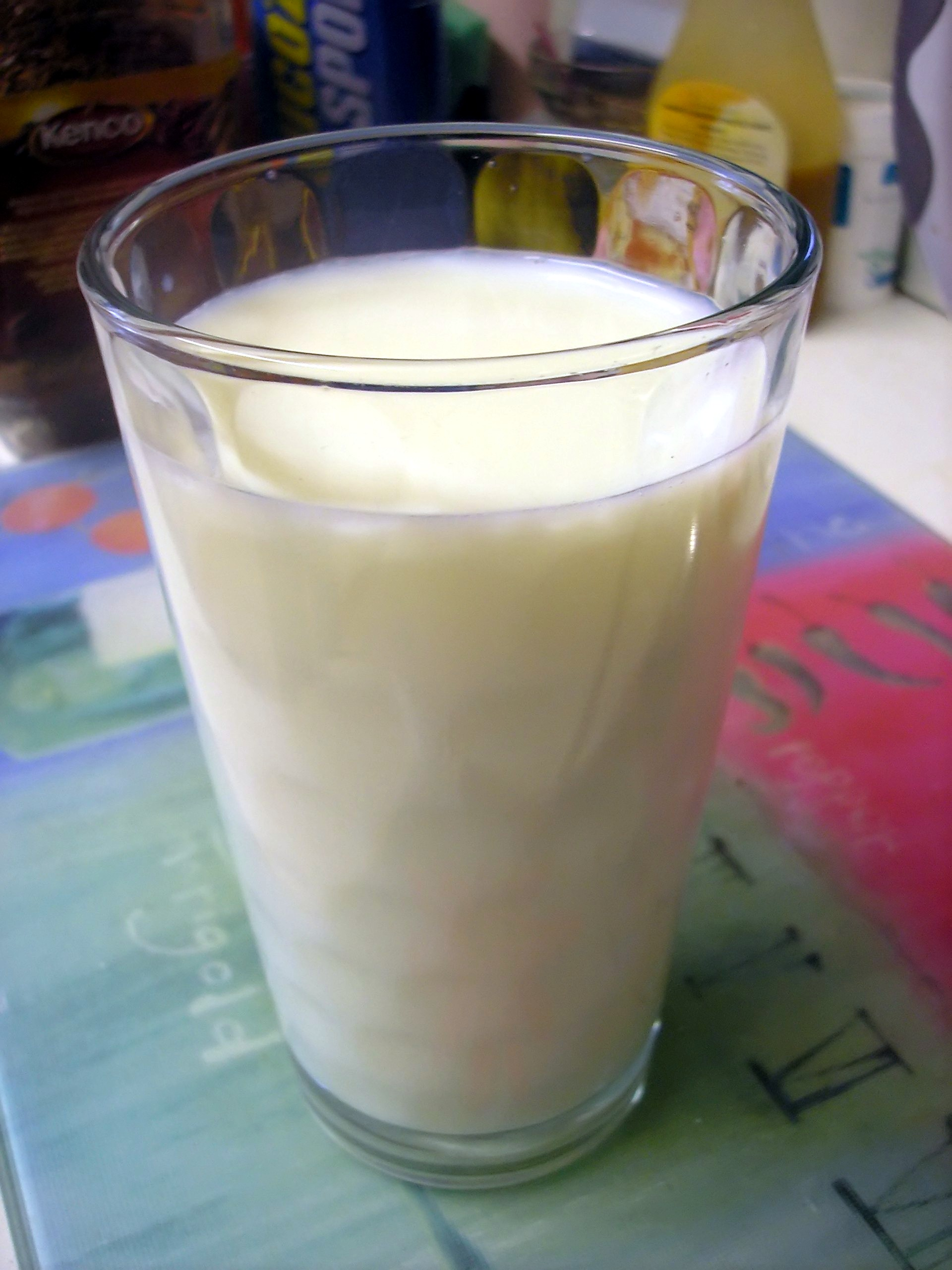
A glass of milk

Organic milk refers to a number of milk products from livestock raised according to organic farming methods. In most jurisdictions, use of the term "organic" or equivalents like "bio" or "eco", on any product is regulated by food authorities. In general these regulations stipulate that livestock must be: allowed to graze, be fed an organically certified fodder or compound feed, not be treated with most drugs (including bovine growth hormone), and in general must be treated humanely.

There are multiple obstacles to forming firm conclusions regarding possible safety or health benefits from consuming organic milk or conventional milk, including the lack of long term clinical studies. The studies that are available have come to conflicting conclusions with regard to absolute differences in nutrient content between organic and conventionally produced milk, such as protein or fatty acid content. The weight of available evidence does not support the position that there are any clinically relevant differences between organic and conventionally produced milk, in terms of nutrition or safety.

== Legal definition ==
In general, all livestock used to produce organic milk must be maintained using the methods of organic farming as defined in the jurisdiction where the milk will be sold, and generally must be certified in order to be marketed as organic. In general, these laws require that livestock be allowed to graze on pasture, be fed organic certified feed (which may not include byproducts of animal slaughter), and that the animals not be treated with drugs (although it is also illegal to withhold necessary drugs from a sick animal in order to maintain that animal's organic status).

- Australia: NASAA Organic Standard
- Canada:
- European Union: EU-Eco-regulation
  - Sweden: KRAV
  - United Kingdom: DEFRA
- Norway: Debio Organic certification
- India: NPOP, (National Program for Organic Production)
- Japan: JAS Standards
- United States: National Organic Program (NOP) Standards

== Comparison with conventional milk ==
=== Chemical composition ===
Studies have examined chemical differences in the composition of organic milk compared with conventional milk. These studies generally suffer from confounding variables, and are difficult to generalize due to differences in the tests that were done, the season of testing and brand of milk tested, and because the vagaries of agriculture affect the chemical composition of milk. Treatment of the foodstuffs after initial gathering (whether milk is pasteurized or raw), the length of time between milking and analysis, as well as conditions of transport and storage, also affect the chemical composition of a given batch.

==== Nutrient content ====
A 2012 meta-analysis of the scientific literature did not find significant differences in the vitamin content of organic and conventional plant or animal products, and found that results varied from study to study. The authors found 4 studies on each of beta-carotene and alpha-tocopherol levels in milk; differences were heterogeneous and not significant. The authors found few studies on fatty acids in milk; all (but for one) were of raw milk, and suggest that raw organic milk may contain significantly more beneficial omega-3 fatty acids and vaccenic acid than raw conventional milk. The authors found no significant differences between organic raw milk and conventional milk with respect to total protein, total fat, or 7 other vitamins and fatty acids tested. (Note: The authors noted that higher levels of beneficial fatty acids in raw organic milk was also found in another recent meta-analysis. The findings from one study of mothers eating exclusively organic foods also found higher levels of vaccenic acid in their breast milk. Statistical analysis of the published studies studying milk and fatty acids raised the possibility of publication bias in these studies. It was also noted that the results of studies that looked at fatty acids content were heterogeneous and small in number, which makes statistically significant differences more difficult to detect and interpret.) A different review concluded, "Results to date suggest that the nutritional content of organic milk is similar to that of conventional milk. There may be a different profile of fatty acids in organic milk, with a higher proportion of PUFA (polyunsaturated fatty acids) relative to other fatty acids, but this effect does not appear to be consistent. This difference will be smaller in fat-reduced milk."

A less comprehensive review published in 2012 looking only at data from studies published from 2008 to 2011 found that organic dairy products contain significantly higher protein, total omega-3 fatty acid, and 5 other fatty acids, but less linoleic acid, oleic acid, and omega-6 fatty acids than those of conventional produced milk. It also found that organic dairy products have significantly higher omega-3 to -6 ratio and Δ9-desaturase index than the conventional types.

==== Chemical and pesticide residue ====
A consumer concern that drives demand for organic food is the concern that conventional foods may contain residues of pesticides and chemicals. Many investigations of organic milk have not measured pesticide residues. One review of the literature concluded the "available evidence indicates that regular and organic milk contain similar trace levels of chemical and pesticide residues."

=== Health and safety ===
With respect to scientific knowledge of health and safety benefits from a diet of organic food, several factors limit our ability to say that there is any health benefit, or detriment, from such a diet. The 2012 meta-analysis noted that "there have been no long-term studies of health outcomes of populations consuming predominantly organic versus conventionally produced food controlling for socioeconomic factors; such studies would be expensive to conduct." A 2009 meta-analysis has noted that there have been very few studies that have looked at direct human health outcomes. In addition, as discussed above, difficulties in accurately and meaningfully measuring chemical differences between organic and conventional milk make it difficult to extrapolate health recommendations based solely on chemical analysis.

The authors of the 2012 meta-analysis ultimately concluded that the review "identified limited evidence for the superiority of organic foods. The evidence does not suggest marked health benefits from consuming organic versus conventional foods".

A review of the literature published by the American Academy of Pediatrics published in 2012 concluded: "There is no evidence of clinically relevant differences in organic and conventional milk. There are few, if any, nutritional differences between organic and conventional milk. There is no evidence that any differences that may exist are clinically relevant. There is no evidence that organic milk has clinically significant higher bacterial contamination levels than does conventional milk. There is no evidence that conventional milk contains significantly increased amounts of bovine growth hormone. Any bovine growth hormone that might remain in conventional milk is not biologically active in humans because of structural differences and susceptibility to digestion in the stomach."

== Taste ==
One review noted that some consumers like the taste of organic milk, while others do not, and suggested that the amount of heat treatment is likely to be a significant factor in determining the taste of the milk. Certain treatments, such as ultra-heat treatments used by milk producers, can impart a slight nutty taste to the milk. Overall, the results of taste testing "are not clear-cut" as to whether organic or conventional milk is preferred.

== Economic factors ==
Compared to conventional milk farms, organic milk farms produce significantly less milk per cow and cost more to operate. Organic dairy co-ops have been a successful economic survival strategy for small to medium-sized producers in the American midwest. Organic milk accounts for 18% of milk sales in the US and was worth $2.5 billion in 2016.

== See also ==
- List of organic food topics
- Natural foods
- Organic food
- Organic livestock farming
- Organic movement
- Sustainable agriculture
