= Quality Assurance International =

U.S.-based international organic certification company

- Founded: 1989
- Headquarters: San Diego, California, U.S.
- Services: Organic, gluten-free, non-GMO, natural personal care, and social responsibility certifications.
- Parent: NSF International
- Website: www.qai-inc.com

Quality Assurance International (QAI) is a United States-based international organic certification company that is authorized by the United States Department of Agriculture (USDA) as "a USDA-accredited certifying agent that operates globally to certify organic operations to National Organic Program standards". It is a for-profit corporation, established in 1989, and headquartered in San Diego, California. It is one of the world's largest certifiers, operating as of 2011 in the United States, Canada, Latin America, the European Union, and Japan.

== Certification programs ==
=== Organic certification ===
QAI offers organic certification under the National Organic Program for agricultural producers, food processing facilities, integrated manufacturing operations, contract packing operations, traders, distributors, retailers, and ultimately consumers.

=== Gluten-free certification ===
QAI, in partnership with National Foundation for Celiac Awareness (NFCA), developed a science-based gluten-free certification program.

The nature of the QAI certification protocols ensures prevention of contamination and co-mingling, critically important for those with allergies to gluten and gluten-intolerance. The QAI and NFCA "Gluten-Free" certification program requires companies to produce products at less than 10 parts per million (ppm) of gluten to receive certification.

=== Personal care certification ===
Under this program, products with a minimum organic content of 70 percent (070) that meet the requirements can make the organic label and marketing claim of "Contains Organic Ingredients". These products can bear the unique NSF/ANSI 305 "Contains Organic Ingredients" mark. The Organic Trade Association considers certification to this standard a best practice. It is required by some retailers for personal care products that do not meet the National Organic Program standard for food.

=== International organic certification ===
As an accredited certifying agent under the USDA's National Organic Program, QAI is also accredited by the USDA for ISO 65 compliance, the Japan Ministry of Agriculture Forestry for JAS (Japanese Agricultural Standard) compliance, and Le Conseil des appellations reservées et des termes valorisants (CARTV).

=== Food safety certification ===
QAI offers joint certification to the British Retail Consortium (BRC), Safe Quality Food (SQF) and FSSC 22000 global food safety standards, which is required by many retailers under the Global Food Safety Initiative (GFSI).

== Accreditations ==
QAI holds the following accreditations:

- United States Department of Agriculture (USDA)

National Organic Program (NOP)
ISO Guide 65

- International Organic Accreditation Service (IOAS)

European Recognition Programme (EU)
ISO Guide 65
Canadian Organic Regime (COR)

- Conseil des appellations reservées et des termes valorisants (CARTV, Canada)
- KEMA
- JAS through their Japan-based, MAFF accredited partner EcoCert

ISO 14001

=== Environmental accreditation ===
QAI achieved ISO 14001 Environmental Management Systems accreditation in June 2010. ISO 14001 registration verifies that QAI has effective procedures in place to monitor and continuously improve its environmental performance. To obtain ISO 14001 registration, QAI reduced energy and raw material use; implemented a paperless documentation and billing management system; developed a recycling program for paper, plastic containers and bags, electronics, mercury-containing light bulbs and batteries; and instituted a composting program for coffee grounds, tea bags and fruit/vegetable food scraps.

== Partnerships ==
QAI works with other leading food safety and quality organizations. As a result, QAI is able to provide additional services:

- NSF/ANSI 305 "Contains Organic Ingredients" Personal Care Products
- NaTrue Personal Care Certification
- British Retail Consortium (BRC), Safe Quality Foods (SQF), FSSC 22000 Certification
- HACCP (Hazard analysis critical control point)
- Star-K Kosher Certification
- IBD Eco-Social Certification
- Dietary Supplement GMP and Certification
- Sustainability Claims Verification
- Non-GMO Project Certification

== Community and industry advocacy ==
QAI is also active in the Organic Trade Association (OTA) to help protect and promote organic practices. QAI Senior Vice President Joe Smillie has served as OTA president and as a member of the board of directors. QAI President Kristen Holt currently serves on the board of directors as treasurer.

== 2008 ginger controversy ==
In July 2008, it was reported that organic powdered ginger that had been certified by QAI, was found when tested to be contaminated with the banned pesticide Aldicarb. The organic ginger from which the QAI certified organic powdered ginger originated had been certified organic by two other USDA accredited certifying agents in China. Under Chinese law, foreigners may not inspect Chinese farms.

== See also ==
- List of organic food topics
- Organic farming – Type of agriculture that emphasizes natural and environmentally friendly techniques
- Organic food – Food complying with organic farming standards
- Soil Association – British registered charity
