= Northland Organic Foods Corporation =

Northland Organic Foods
- Company type: Private company
- Industry: Certified organic & non-GMO, identity preserved (IP) raw materials and food ingredients
- Founded: 1991
- Founder: Peter Shortridge
- Headquarters: Saint Paul, Minnesota
- Key people: Peter Shortridge, President; Amy Nankivil, International Marketing Director; Susan Ponsolle, Marketing Manager
- Products: Oil seeds & grains Flours & meals Edible oils IP lecithins IP tocopherols
- Website: Northland Organic Foods

Northland Organic Foods Corporation (NOFC) was a global food and agricultural products company based in Saint Paul, Minnesota. Founded in 1991, Northland was in the organic foods industry, specializing in the development, production, and international distribution of certified organic and conventional non-GMO specialty food and feed-use seeds, whole soybeans, corn, wheat and other cereal grains. Northland also produces and markets identity-preserved value-added ingredients such as soy meal, grits, flours, oils, lecithins and whole soybean powder under the IP Pure label.

Northland Organic Foods is actively involved on a local, national and international level in community programs and ecological conferences whose goals are to promote organic and sustainable agriculture. The company also sponsors a website called Seed to Plate, a non-profit informational online resource dedicated to providing a forum for the discussion of agricultural, environmental, and artistic issues with the goal toward solutions and action.

Northland Organic Foods is the sister company of Northland Seed & Grain Corporation, based in Saint Paul, Minnesota, a producer and global supplier of identity preserved, non-GMO seeds, raw materials and ingredients to the food manufacturing and feed industries. Northland Seed & Grain’s seed breeding program is centered on the development of traditionally crossbred, organic and non-GMO specialty variety seeds and grains.

The company offers a low-fat soy product.

== See also ==
- Certified naturally grown
- Identity preserved
- Organic agriculture
- Organic food
- National Organic Program
