= Whole Foods Co-op =

Minnesota food cooperative

Coordinates: 46°47′43.47″N 92°5′41.53″W

- Type: Consumers' Cooperative
- Founded: 1970
- Headquarters: Duluth, Minnesota, United States
- Key people: Sarah Hannigan, General Manager (as of 2016), Sharon Murphy, General Manager (retired in 2016); Mickey Pearson, Board President
- Products: Whole foods, Organic food
- Website: wholefoods.coop

Whole Foods Co-op is a food cooperative located in Duluth, Minnesota. Founded in 1970 by the members of a food buying club, the grocery is owned by over 10,000 active owners and is a member of the National Cooperative Grocers Association.

== History ==
In 1970, the Whole Foods buying club was formed by 20 people in Duluth, Minnesota. The club merged with the Community Food Buying Club in 1973. Whole Foods went on to take over the operations of the West End Co-op in 1981, only to see it close two years later.

In 2005, the cooperative expanded into a LEED certified building located at 610 E 4th St. Whole Foods was the first retailer in Minnesota and the first cooperative in the nation to receive LEED certification for its building.

After the Minnesota Health Department stopped allowing participants in the WIC program to purchase organic food in 2002, the cooperative offered to cover the difference and take a loss on behalf of its customers, but was refused by Health Department officials.

In 2004, Whole Foods began using the IS4C point of sale system for its registers.

In 2006, Whole Foods attained Certified Organic status through the National Organic Program for its operations.

In 2016, Whole Foods Co-op expanded by opening a second location in the Denfeld neighborhood of Duluth, Minnesota.

== See also ==
- George Street Co-op
- List of food cooperatives
