= Value-added agriculture =

Value-added agriculture refers most generally to manufacturing processes that increase the value of primary agricultural commodities. Value-added agriculture may also refer to increasing the economic value of a commodity through particular production processes, e.g., organic produce, or through regionally branded products that increase consumer appeal and willingness to pay a premium over similar but undifferentiated products. It can also be described as the process that transforms the raw agricultural product into something new through packaging, processing, cooling, drying, extracting, and other processes that change a product from its original raw form. As a result of this transformation, the customer base of a product and revenue sources for the producer are expanded.

In this strategy, farming is no longer confined to the cultivation of vast tract of land or the care for a large number of animals in order to be profitable. Here, even those who own less than an acre could achieve viable farming simply by extending an agricultural product's potential so that its saleability is enhanced. For example, if a producer farms strawberries, he should not only sell the crop as fresh berries since he could also profit from its other portions by producing other products such as strawberry jelly and syrup.

== High-demand ==
This concept has gained currency in the small farm policy debate, in response to the concern that the farm value of the consumer food dollar continues to decrease. Value-added agriculture might be a means for farmers to capture a larger share of the consumer food dollar. Examples include direct marketing; farmer ownership of processing facilities; and producing farm products with a higher intrinsic value (such as identity-preserved grains, organic produce, organic beef, free-range chickens; etc.), for which buyers are willing to pay a higher price than for more traditional bulk commodities. The key for the higher returns is the high-demand in product niches and this is demonstrated in the popularity of products such as garlic braids, bagged salad mix, artisan bread, lavender soaps, and sausages, among others.

Value-added agriculture is regarded by some as a significant rural development strategy. In the United States, this is considered a way for producers not only to increase their income but also compete with commodity marketers and upstream processors. Small-scale, organic food processing, non-traditional crop production, agri-tourism, and bio-fuels development are examples of various value-added projects that have also created new jobs in some rural places. This favorable condition is encouraged by the increasing market segmentation which creates an uptick in the demand for high-quality and differentiated agricultural products. According to a study, value-added agriculture allows farmers to capture as much as 80 percent of the value of most of their agricultural produce.
