= Value-added (disambiguation) =

Value added is offering additional features with goods or services.

Value-added may also refer to:

- Value-added tax, a tax based on gross profits (the difference between the cost of goods sold and the selling price)
- Value-added modeling, a method of teacher evaluation that attempts to identify how much student achievement is due to the teacher
- Value-added reseller, a company that adds features to an existing product, then resells it, usually to end-users
- Value-added service, extra services in the telecommunications industry
- Value-added network, a hosted service offering that acts as an intermediary between business partners
- Value-added theory, a sociological theory that describes the development of group behavior
- Value-added agriculture, manufacturing processes that increase the value of primary agricultural commodities
  - Value-Added Producer Grants, a US program to promote the development and marketing of value-added agricultural products
- Value chain or value-added chain, the set of activities performed by a firm to create a product or service of value
