= Whole Foods =

Whole Foods may refer to:

- Whole foods, a group of foods that are unprocessed and unrefined
- Whole Foods Co-op, a food cooperative located in Duluth, Minnesota
- Whole Foods Market, an organic supermarket chain owned by Amazon
