= OCIA =

OCIA may refer to:

- Order of Christian Initiation of Adults
- Organic Crop Improvement Association
