= National Organic Standards Board =

The National Organic Standards Board (NOSB) is an advisory board that makes recommendations to the United States Secretary of Agriculture on organic food and products. Members are appointed by the Secretary and these make recommendations, one of the most important of which is to review and develop the National List of Approved and Prohibited Substances.

== Members ==
In accordance with the Organic Foods Production Act of 1990 within the 1990 Farm Bill, the United States Secretary of Agriculture set up a 15-member board to make recommendations on policies regulating the production and distribution of organic food and products. Currently, the members serving on the National Organic Standards Board include: employees from four organic farms; employees of six environmental and chemical activist groups; two employees from organic food processors; one organic store owner; one ecologist; and one employee from an organic certification company. Subcommittees include: Crops; Livestock; Handling; Compliance, Accreditation, and Certification; and Policy Development. Members can serve on multiple committees at the same time and the full chart of assignments can be found at USDA National Organic Program website. The first members of the board were appointed by USDA Secretary Edward Madigan in January 1992. Board members serve five year terms.

Past members include Campbell Soup Company executive and organic expert Mr. Steven DeMuri.

== Duties of the Board ==
The duties of the NOSB board members are outlined in the Organic Foods Production Act of 1990 (OFPA). They relate to the general responsibility the Board has in order to ensure regulations are enforced in the organic farming community as well as specific aids that the Board swears to provide in case of an agricultural emergency. The Board is trusted to provide the Secretary of Agriculture with legitimate recommendations which implement the policies outlined in the OFPA. One of their most important duties is the review and development of the National List of Approved and Prohibited Substances. Before the official National List is recognized, the Board must have the knowledge of any and all “botanical pesticides” utilized and decide whether they should be included on the list of prohibited substances. Members advise the Secretary, but are not responsible for overseeing the testing of “organically produced agricultural products”, which could lead to “unavoidable” environmental contamination or health hazards. Their last duty is concerned with allowing exemptions to regulations in the case of an outbreak of harmful pest or disease that might qualify as an agricultural emergency and require more extreme pesticide use or disease control.

== Recommendation Procedure ==
Extensive research is done on every case and that outside knowledge is often sought in order to ensure the most comprehensive management scheme is created. General standards the Board must adhere to when reviewing policies are listed below:

“USDA National Organic Standards Board (NOSB) definition, April 1995 “Organic agriculture is an ecological production management system that promotes and enhances biodiversity, biological cycles and soil biological activity. It is based on minimal use of off-farm inputs and on management practices that restore, maintain and enhance ecological harmony.

“‘Organic’ is a labeling term that denotes products produced under the authority of the Organic Foods Production Act. The principal guidelines for organic production are to use materials and practices that enhance the ecological balance of natural systems and that integrate the parts of the farming system into an ecological whole.

“Organic agriculture practices cannot ensure that products are completely free of residues; however, methods are used to minimize pollution from air, soil and water.

“Organic food handlers, processors and retailers adhere to standards that maintain the integrity of organic agricultural products. The primary goal of organic agriculture is to optimize the health and productivity of interdependent communities of soil life, plants, animals and people.”

== See also ==
- List of organic food topics
