= Organic aquaculture =

Holistic method for farming marine species

Organic aquaculture is a holistic method for farming fish and other marine species in line with organic principles. The ideals of this practice established sustainable marine environments with consideration for naturally occurring ecosystems, use of pesticides, and the treatment of aquatic life. Managing aquaculture organically has become more popular since consumers are concerned about the harmful impacts of aquaculture on themselves and the environment.

The availability of certified organic aquaculture products have become more widely available since the mid-1990s. This seafood growing method has become popular in Germany, the United Kingdom and Switzerland, but consumers can be confused or skeptical about the label due to conflicting and misleading standards around the world.

A certified organic product seal on aquaculture products will mean an accredited certifying body has verified that the production methods meet or exceed a country's standard for organic aquaculture production. Organic regulations designed around soil-based systems don't transfer well into aquaculture and tend to conflict with large-scale, intensive (economically viable) practices/goals. There are a number of problems facing organic aquaculture: difficulty of sourcing and certifying organic juveniles (hatchery or sustainable wild stock); 35-40% higher feed cost; more labour-intensive; time and cost of the certification process; a higher risk of diseases, and uncertain benefits. But, there is a definite consumer demand for organic seafood, and organic aquaculture may become a significant management option with continued research.

== Certification ==
A number of countries have created their own national standards and certifying bodies for organic aquaculture. While there is not simply one international organic aquaculture standardization process, one of the largest certification organizations is the Global Trust, which delivers assessments and certifications to match the highest quality organic aquaculture standards. The information regarding these standards is available through a personal inquiry.

Many organic aquaculture certifications address a variety of issues including antibiotic and chemical treatments of fish, unrestrained disposal of fish feces into the ocean, fish feeding materials, the habitat of where and how the fish are raised, and proper handling practices including slaughter. Most Organic Aquaculture certifications follow rather strict requirements and standards. These rules may vary between different countries or certification bodies. This leads to confusion when products are imported from other countries, which can result in a backlash from consumers (for example, the Pure Salmon Campaign ).

Defining acceptable practices is also complicated by the variety of species - freshwater, saltwater, shellfish, finfish, mollusks and aquatic plants. The difficulty of screening pollutants out of an aquatic medium, controlling the food supplies and of keeping track of individual fish may mean that fish and shellfish stocks should not be classified as 'livestock' at all under regulations. This point further exemplifies the need for widespread aquaculture certification standard.

=== Challenges and Controversy ===
==== Wild caught vs. organic ====
There is some controversy over licensing restrictions, as some seafood companies propose that wild caught fish should be classified as organic. While wild fish may be free of pesticides and unsustainable rearing practices, the fishing industry may not necessarily be environmentally sustainable. In October 2001, the National Organic Standards Board of the USDA decided that 'aquatic animals' (i.e. fish and shellfish) cannot be organic since animals survive in contaminated water, and the food they eat lacks protection from a polluted environment. Farmed fish also are at some risk for pollution exposure since they also may eat wild fish for food but, relative to the wild fish, farmed fish are more likely to be given the "organic" label. The official definitions of organic and organic practices refer to ecological processes and the USDA on organic matter finally defined the organic production as a production system which is managed.

==== Consistent standards ====
In 2010, around 80 different organic aquaculture standards exist, of which there are 18 in the countries of the European Union. The variation in standards, as well as the unknown level of actual compliance and the closeness of investigations when certifying are major problems in consistent organic certification. In 2010, new rules were proposed in the European Union to consistently define the organic aquaculture industry. Canada's General Standards Board's (CGSB) proposed updates to their standards were strongly opposed in 2010 because they allowed antibiotic and chemical treatments of fish, up to 30 percent non-organic feed, deadly and uncontrolled impacts on wild species and unrestrained disposal of fish feces into the ocean. These standards would have certified net pen systems as organic. At the other end of the scale, the extremely strict national legislation in Denmark has made it difficult for the existing organic trout industry to develop.

==== Potential Alternatives To Non-Organic Feed and Waste Removal ====
One major issue in organic aquaculture production is finding practical and sustainable alternatives to non-organic veterinary treatments, feeds, spat and waste disposal. Potential veterinary alternatives include homeopathic treatments and production-cycle limited allopathic or chemical treatments Current requirements usually stipulate a reduction in unsustainable fishmeal, in favor of organic vegetable and fish by-product replacements. A recent study into organic fish feeds for salmon found that while organic feed provide some benefit to the environmental impact of the fishes' life cycles, the loss of fish meals and oils have a significant negative impact. Another study discovered that certain percentages of dietary protein could be safely replaced.

Not only do the fish have to be organically reared, organic fish feeds need to be developed. Research into ways of decreasing the amount on non-sustainable fishmeal in feed is currently focusing on replacement by organic vegetable proteins. Some organic fish feeds becoming available, and/or the option of integrated multi-species systems (e.g. growing plants using aquaponics, as well as larvae, insects, or other fish). For example, locating a shellfish bed next to a finfish farm to dispose of the waste and provide the shellfish with controlled nutrients. The organic residue from feed and fish wastes need regular monitoring, and analysis on the water released from the system and the water in the pool every 3 or 4 months.

The organic residue from feed and fish wastes need regular monitoring, and analysis on the water released from the system and the water in the pool every 3 or 4 months.

==== Other issues ====
A major challenge for fish farmers is that wild fish can enter the organic farming environment, or organic fish may escape.

=== Certifying bodies that cover organic aquaculture ===
Certification body	Countries of operation	No. of certified aquaculture farms	Accredited for grower groups	No. of certified groups	Aquaculture commodities within the scheme	Production (tonnes)
Agrior	Israel	2 + 1 fish feed mill	no	NA	Tilapia, carp, red drum, sea bass, sea bream, Ulva and Ulea seaweed	400
AgriQuality Ltd.	New Zealand, Vanuatu, Cook Islands, Malaysia		yes			
Bioland e.V.	Germany, Austria, Belgium, France, Italy, Netherlands, Switzerland		no			
Debio	Norway	3	no	NA	salmon, trout, cod	trout 0.5 salmon 120 cod 600
Instituto Biodinamico	Brazil, Argentina, Bolivia, Mexico, Paraguay, Uruguay		yes			
Istituto per la Certificazione Etica e Ambientale	Italy, Lebanon, Turkey		yes			
National Association Sustainable Agriculture Australia	Australia, Timor-Leste, Indonesia, Malaysia, Nepal, New Zealand, Papua New Guinea, Samoa, Sri Lanka, Solomon Islands		yes			
Organic Agriculture Certification Thailand	Thailand	1 (not under the IFOAM-accredited scheme)	Example	0	nile tilapia and butter fish	8 000 litres (fish sauce)

Table from IFOAM: Annex 6. Organic schemes

- United Kingdom The Soil Association
- Hungary Biokontrol Hungaria
- Naturland (Association for Organic Agriculture)
- Spain: Voluntary standards set by the Advisory Group CRAE do not cover organic aquaculture.
- New Zealand - BioGro
- Switzerland - Bio Suisse
- Nordic countries (Sweden, Norway) as well as Japan, Thailand and Australia - KRAV

==== United States Organic Aquaculture Certification ====
In 2005, with the growing need for a certification process specifically designed for marine-based farming methods, the National Organic Standards Board and the National Organics Program created a working group called the Aquatic Animal Task Force to seek recommendations for the new certification process. The task force was meant to be broken into two divisions: wild fisheries and aquaculture, but the wild fisheries group never materialized.

In 2006, the Aquaculture Working Group delivered a report with suggestions for the production and handling of aquatic animals and plants. However, with the complexity and diversity of the marine systems, the group requested more time to explore bivalve mollusks (oysters, clams, mussels and scallops) in depth. The National Organic Standards Board approved the aquaculture standards in 2007 and reconsidered the aquatic animal feed and facilities until they synthesized the public commentary in 2008. In 2010, the NOSB approved the recommendations for the bivalve mollusks section.

Currently, the legal status of using the organic label for aquatic species, and the future of developing U.S. Department of Agriculture (USDA) certification standards for organic aquaculture products and aquatic species, are under review. It is anticipated that the first version of the rule for organic aquaculture will be announced in April or May 2016 with need for approval by the Office of Management and Budget. It is expected to see the final rule in play by late summer or fall of 2016 with organic aquaculture products likely available in store in 2017. The certification is said to include the following: shellfish, marine and recirculating system methods of aquaculture, as well as the controversial net-pen method.

The US currently allows the imports of organically-certified seafood from Europe, Canada and other countries around the world.

== Production ==
Organic aquaculture was responsible for an estimated US$46.1 billion internationally (2007). There were 0.4 million hectares of certified organic aquaculture in 2008 compared to 32.2 million hectares dedicated to Organic farming. The 2007 production was still only 0.1% of total aquaculture production

The market for organic aquaculture shows strong growth in Europe, especially France, Germany, and the UK—for example, the market in France grew 220% from 2007 to 2008. There is a preference for organic food, where available. Organic seafood is now sold in discount supermarket chains throughout the EU. The top five producing countries are the UK, Ireland, Hungary, Greece, and France. 123 of the 225 global certified organic aquaculture farms operate in Europe and were responsible for 50,000 tonnes in 2008 (nearly half global production).

Organic seafood products are a niche market, and users currently expect to pay premiums of 30-40%, although there are "varying dimensions and durability." Organic salmon is the top species and retails at 50%. Market demand is driving Danish rainbow trout farmers to switch to organic farming.

In 2008, production was 53,500 tons with a market value of 300 million USD and produced by 240 certified operations, of which 72 are in China. Global production was 16,000 tons of organic squid, 8,800 tons of organic shrimp, 7,200 tons of squid, 3,000 tons of mussels, 2,000 tons of squid, and 1,000 tons of squid/sea bream. Predictions for 2016 were 20,000 tons and 1 million tons in 2030, accounting for 0.6% of total aquaculture production.

== Data by country ==
=== Asia ===
Country	Organically managed area [ha]
Bangladesh	2'000
China	415'000
Indonesia^{1}	1'317
Thailand	33
Total	418'350

^{1}Indonesian Shrimp farms are locally certified as organic but a recent study found them to be highly environmentally damaging.

=== Europe ===
Austria was the first to set an organic standard, implementing it for the common carp in 1995. In 2000, France and the UK established their own national organic standards for fish, and an international standard was established by the IFOAM.

- Denmark: Rainbow Trout. Organic production ~400 tonnes (1% of total trout production)
- UK:

Cod and carp Trout Salmon

- Rainbow Trout (Denmark)
- Salmon (80% of organic aquaculture production in 2000)

and shrimp (Europe)

- Carp (low volume production, poorly marketed - Europe)

=== North America ===
- Shellfish: oyster, clam, mussel, scallop, geoduck seed (USA)

Organic production of crops and livestock in the United States is regulated by the Department of Agriculture's National Organic Program (NOP). While it does cover aquaponics, it did not properly cover aquaculture until the recent 2008 amendment, hampering the progress of organic aquaculture in the states. Because no standards were set for organic fish in the US at the time, a California state law was passed banning the sale of fish labelled as organic.

In 2021 a number of major seafood associations indicated their support for a USDA plan to label wild-caught Alaskan seafood as organic.

=== Australia ===
==== New Zealand ====
The first certified organic aquaculture farm in New Zealand was a salmon farm which was the largest producer outside of Europe contributing to the European market. New Zealand green-lipped mussel Greenshell mussels - certified by Sealord (12), DOM ORGANICS Greenshell mussels, certified organic by Bio-Gro New Zealand Ltd. (BGNZ)

Salmon (14) 12 tonnes/year - Ormond Aquaculture Ltd certified (CERTNZ) organic freshwater aquaculture farm

Koura (freshwater crayfish) Still being developed - Ormond Aquaculture Ltd certified (CERTNZ) organic freshwater aquaculture farm

=== South America ===
- In March 2010, the first American salmon farm in Chile passed an organic certification which is certified by the USDA and other institutions.

== Future Research and Development ==
Various methods and complementary processes are being investigated as alternatives for organic aquaculture, most notably Integrated Multi-Trophic Aquaculture(IMTA) and aquaponics (a land-based outgrowth of aquaculture in many places). Organic methods of farming various species are also topics of interest, particularly shrimps, salmon and Atlantic Cod

Demand for organic fish has been primarily in the European market, especially Germany, the UK, France and Switzerland. While European market demand continues, there was also growing demand in North America and Japan by 2008

Projects such as ORAQUA are implementing scientific recommendations that support economic growth of Europe's organic aquaculture industry. The goals of this organization are as follows:

1. Reassess the relevance, measurability and applicability of Regulation EC 710/2009 for organic aquaculture against the basic organic principles;
2. Generate robust science-based recommendations for potential updates of the EC regulation as regards aquaculture of fish species, molluscs, crustaceans and seaweed, based on comprehensive reviewing, research and assessment, in addition to integrating feedback from key stakeholders;
3. Produce executive dossiers on the main technical background behind the recommendations that will emerge from this project;
4. To underpin consumer demand for organic aquaculture products and development of organic aquaculture industry by integrating aspects of consumer perceptions, unique competitive qualities as well as production systems, business and market economics and regulatory framework;
5. To propose a model for continuous assessment and advice on the improvement of regulations of organic aquaculture in the future, taking account of new scientific insights and changing competitive market environments.
