= People's Food Co-op =

Food cooperative in Portland, Oregon

Coordinates: 45°30′2.9″N 122°38′41.71″W

People's Food Cooperative
- Company type: Consumers' co-operative
- Founded: 1970
- Headquarters: Portland, Oregon, United States
- Products: organic food
- Members: ~10,000
- Website: peoples.coop

People's Food Co-op or just the People's Co-op is a food cooperative located in Portland, Oregon. Founded in 1970 by the members of a food-buying club, the co-op is owned by over 3000 member-owners and is a member of the National Cooperative Grocers Association and the United States Federation of Worker Cooperatives.

== History ==
The co-op was founded as a food buying club by students from Reed College. In 1970, the group incorporated as People's Food Store.

== Governance and management ==
=== Board of directors ===
The Board of Directors at People's Food Co-op consists of 5-9 members elected by the membership of the co-op. The Board uses a modified version of consensus decision-making to reach its decisions. In 2006, the Board adopted Policy Governance as its governance model.

=== Collective management ===
People's is managed by a non-hierarchical collective. As of 2007, there are 27 co-managers. Collective meetings are held once a month where co-managers make decisions regarding the co-op's operations. Like the Board, the collective uses a modified version of consensus decision-making. 26 out of the 27 co-managers have to agree on given proposals. The collective is divided into semi-autonomous "teams" which are responsible for reporting and heading up their various departments. The collective is accountable to the membership via the Board.

== Expansion ==
In 2002, People's embarked upon an expansion project to increase its retail space. People's secured loans from its membership and Shorebank Pacific to finance the $900,000 expansion project. The expansion doubled the store's retail space and included an expanded Community Room as well as an elevator for wheelchair access. The co-op's efforts won them a BEST (Businesses for an Environmentally Sustainable Tomorrow) Award from the City of Portland's Office of Sustainable Development in 2003 for energy efficiency.

== Building features ==
The building which People's Food Co-op occupies incorporates a number of environmentally friendly technologies. All of the wood used for the expansion was either salvaged or FSC certified. The building's natural ventilation was improved by the use of a solar chimney.

=== Green roofs ===
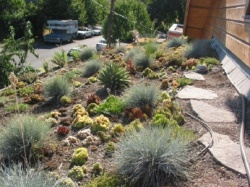
One of People's green roofs

People's added two green roofs to its building during its expansion. Drought-tolerant plant species were chosen for the green roofs. Due to the stormwater management benefits, People's received a $2,500 grant from the Community Watershed Stewardship Program.

=== Cob ===
Cob, a mixture of earth, sand and straw, was used as infill for two walls of the building as well as for benches inside and outside of the store. People's Food Co-op was the first commercially zoned building in North America to be built with cob wall infill.

=== Geothermal ===
The co-op is heated and cooled by use of a geothermal exchange heat pump which includes a series of tubes coursing water through the store's floor. This system, in conjunction with other design strategies, has reduced the heating and cooling energy consumption at the co-op by approximately 40%.

=== Mural ===
In 2022, People's Food Co-op was selected as a site for a mural campaign by the nonprofit Fairtrade America. The mural depicts Ghanaian farmer and climate advocate Deborah Osei-Mensah, whose community produces fair trade cocoa.

== People's farmers' market ==
People's hosts a year-round farmers market in its courtyard on Wednesday afternoons. In operation since 1994, it is the longest year-round farmers market in Portland. In the summer months, there are typically 15-20 vendors offering a variety of locally grown and produced goods.

== Philosophy and buying guidelines ==
People's Food Co-op has adopted a model of ethical consumerism and adheres to strict guidelines for the products that are retailed as well as its practices. By vote of the membership, the co-op does not carry any products containing meat with the exception of pet food. The Board of Directors has approved product selection guidelines prohibiting products containing artificial colors, flavoring, or preservatives. The guidelines also allow for the exclusion of products from companies that test on animals or operate in contradiction to the co-op's mission.

People's composts all of its vegetable waste off-site at the 47th Avenue Farm in Portland via an industrial vermicomposting bin.

The co-op maintains connections to the cooperative movement via its membership in regional and national cooperative federations. People's is a member of the National Cooperative Grocers Association, the United States Federation of Worker Cooperatives, and the Portland Alliance of Worker Cooperatives.

== People's community room ==
People's Food Co-op has a community meeting space on-site for public and private events. Free yoga classes for members are held in the room. The room is also used for capoeira and tai chi, as well as for meetings of both the membership and the Board of Directors. A lift was built during the expansion to ensure accessibility to the space.

== IS4C ==
In 2006, People's Food Co-op began using IS4C, an open-source Point of Sale (PoS) System. The program was developed by Tak Tang of the Wedge Community Co-op in Minneapolis, Minnesota. People's ported the IS4C software to the Linux platform, making it the only open-source software made specifically for food cooperatives.

== See also ==
- List of food cooperatives
- Food co-op
