= Lotus Foods =

Import company in Richmond, California, US

- Type: Private
- Genre: Natural foods; Heirloom rice; SRI Rice
- Founded: 1995
- Founder: Ken Lee; Caryl Levine
- Headquarters: Richmond, U.S.
- Website: lotusfoods.com

Lotus Foods is a Richmond, California–based company that focuses on importing handcrafted rice from small family farms to the United States. The company was founded in 1995 by Caryl Levine and Kenneth Lee. Their first and most popular product is a black rice called Forbidden Rice.

== History ==
The company was founded in 1995 by Caryl Levine and Kenneth Lee, two years after they took a marketing research trip to China where they were served a bowl of black rice, something they had never heard about before.

== Products ==
Lotus offers a variety of rice products including traditional basmati rice and jasmine rice, Black Forbidden Rice (black rice), Jade Pearl Rice (short-grain rice infused with bamboo extract), Bhutanese red rice, Madagascar pink rice, and Volcano Rice. In 2018, the company launched Rice Ramen soup cups, instant noodles made out of their rice noodles.

== Awards and recognition ==
Lotus Foods has won multiple awards for their products as well as for their involvement in SRI rice. In 2008 they were invited as panelists to discuss Food Security and Poverty at the Clinton Global Initiative alongside Madeleine Albright and representatives for the Bill & Melinda Gates Foundation. In 2009 they were awarded Nutrition Business Journal's Environment and Sustainability Award for their SRI related work done in conjunction with Cornell University's SRI Global Marketing Partnership. In their first year as a member of the National Association of the Specialty Food Trade (NASFT) in 1998, Forbidden Rice became a Silver Finalist in the Outstanding New Product category of the annual Sofi Awards competition. To date, the company has won nine Sofi Awards.
