= Organic wild =

Organic wild refers to organic agriculture products which are collected from wild land. As of 2005, organic wild products are farmed on approximately 62 million hectares. According to the International Federation of Organic Agricultural Movements 36% of these were bamboo shoots, 21% were fruits and berries, and 19% were nuts (IFOAM 2007:10). The first IFOAM conference on organic wild products was held in May 2006.

== See also ==
- Agriculture
- Organic farming
- Wildculture
