= Plum Baby =

British baby food company

Plum Baby logo

Plum Baby was a United Kingdom company producing organic food for babies, based in Taplow.

In August 2014 the company announced that they were to cease trading. This announcement followed a number of product recalls in 2013 after the founder sold the business to Darwin Private Equity. There were no recalls whilst under control of the founder.

Founded in 2004 by Susie Willis, the brand produced organic baby and toddler food. Products were sold in all the major UK supermarkets including Ocado. Plum was positioned at the premium end of the baby food market and at one time had a 4% share of the baby food sector in the UK, worth £11m. Plum Baby was a member of Organic Farmers and Growers. It was one of the first 'challenger' brands in the ambient babyfood sector, positioned as a superfood, organic brand avoiding traditional rice bulkers and starches, replacing with quinoa protein.

== History ==
The British-based Plum Baby was founded in 2004 by Susie Willis and launched in February 2006 after an initial exclusive launch with Sainsbury's. Within 12 months of launch, company products were available in 2,500 supermarket stores. The founders sold to Darwin Private Equity in May 2010 in a deal that valued the company at £10 million.

In January 2013 Plum Baby Ltd was sold to US based Plum organics. Then, in June 2013 Plum organics was acquired by Campbell Soup. In 2013, the Campbell Soup Company bought out Plum Organics using available credit. In November 2013, Plum Organics recalled several baby food products for a spoilage defect. Plum Baby Ltd shut down in August 2014.

In 2021, Plum Organics was sold to Sun-Maid Growers of California.

== Products ==
Plum Baby had 38 products ranges including Stage 1 – 3 baby and toddler food, snack ranges and others. All Plum Baby products were described 100% organic.

The wet food was sold in resealable pouches, which contained aluminium, sandwiched between two layers of plastic which eliminated the need for preservatives and meant that the food could be minimally processed. The aluminium never came in direct contact with the food to ensure it was safe for consumption. Many of the pouches were recalled as the seals on some lines of baby food failed causing the contents to spoil.

Plum Baby products contained no added sugar, salt or water. No additives, E numbers or GM products. Plum Baby Organics prepared baby food was more nutritious when compared to other brands due to quinoa added for texture.
