= Alb-Leisa =

Varieties of lentils from the Swabian Jura, Germany

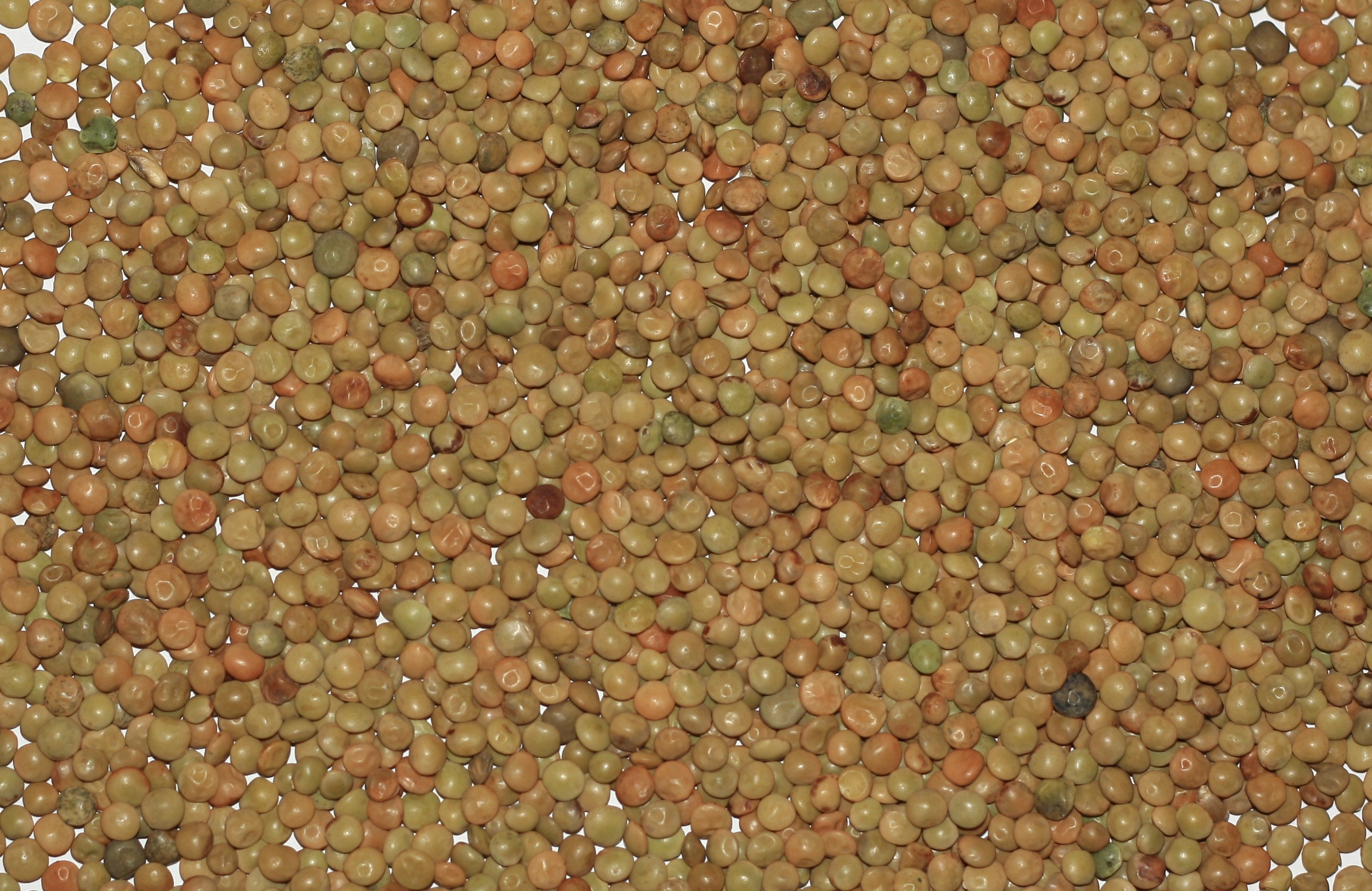
Alb-Leisa lentils

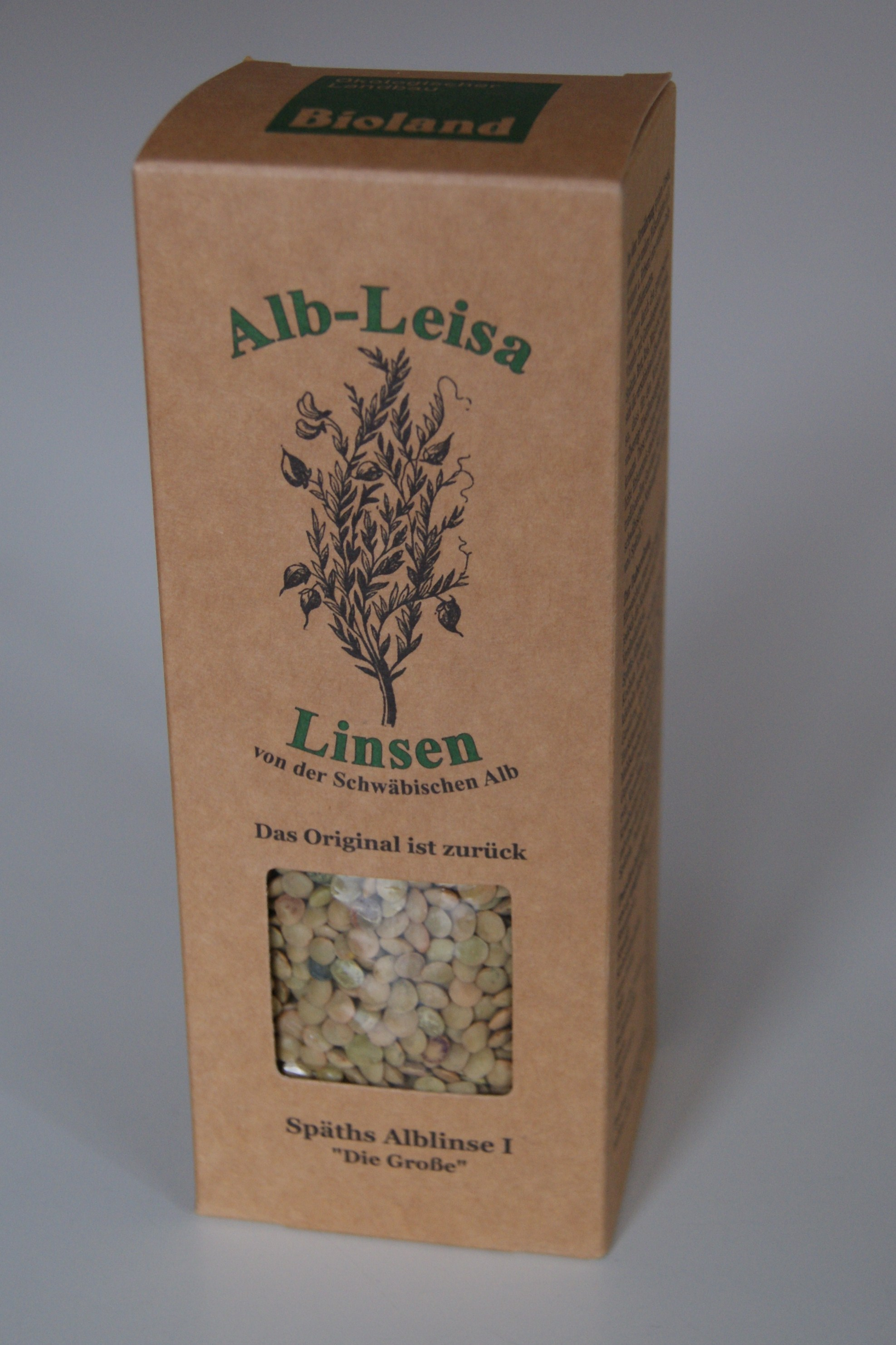
500 g package

The term Alb-Leisa firstly means the Öko-Erzeugergemeinschaft Alb-Leisa (engl. "Eco-producer association Alb-Leisa"), secondly a trade name and thirdly traditional varieties of lentils from the Swabian Jura, Germany. "Leisa" means lentils in Swabian.

The Alb-Leisa was included in the Ark of Taste at Slow Food Deutschland in 2012. There are currently 70 small farms in this group. The marketing of Alb-Leise is done by Lauteracher Alb-Feld-Früchte, formerly known as Biohof Mammel. Especially in the region Baden-Württemberg and Bavaria, but also via webshops.

== History ==
The originally Near Eastern lentil is one of the oldest cultivated plants. In 1908, the daily newspaper Tübinger Chronik reported an increase in cultivation on the Alb. Until the 1950s, the Swabian Jura and its surroundings were the centre of lentil cultivation in Germany. After that there was no lentil cultivation in this region anymore, it had become uneconomical. In 1985, the Biohof Mammel in Lauterach started again with the cultivation of lentils. Demand rose slowly. From 2001 onwards, other organic farms were also interested in lentil cultivation. That is why the Öko-Erzeugergemeinschaft Alb-Leisa (Eco-producer association Alb-Leisa) was founded.

=== Renaissance of the Swabian lentil varieties ===
The traditional Swabian lentil varieties disappeared completely by 1985. There was no seed available at all. For this reason, the organic farm Mammel and later the producer's association cultivated the French Le Puy green lentil. In 2006, in the gene bank of the Vavilov Institute in St. Petersburg the classic Swabian lentil varieties were accidentally discovered and brought back to Germany. Since then they have been grown again on the Swabian Jura.

At present, three genotypes of these lentils are used in the Swabian Jura, which are protected by the producers' association under the name of Alb-Leisa. These are the classic Swabian varieties of lentils of the breeder Fritz Späth from Haigerloch: "Späths Alb-Leisa small", "Späths Alb-Leisa large" and "Späths Heller-Leisa". "Späths Alblinse small" is relatively small and dark brown to black marbled. It was put back on the market for the first time in autumn 2011. Three genotypes are currently cultivated under the accession numbers "K-2076" (small-seeded "Späths Alb-Leisa I") and "K-2106" (large-seeded "Späths Alb-Leisa") (VIR 2008a). They are protected under the name Alb-Leisa of the producer group.

The producer group or the farmer who grows the lentils takes care of the variety care and seed production. There are hardly any professional seed propagators here.

Since the old varieties were no longer available, the French Puy lentils were used, which are suitable for the soil and climate of the Swabian Jura and are sold as "dark green marbled lentils". It was the most produced variety in 2011.

== See also ==
- Brenntar
