= Japanese Agricultural Standard =

JAS Mark

The JAS logo for organic products

The Japanese Agricultural Standards (日本農林規格 (Nihon Nōrin Kikaku)) are standards for the agriculture industry maintained by the Japanese Government. They are comparable to Japanese Industrial Standards but for food and agricultural products. Once a product has passed tests conducted by government-backed rating bureaus the JAS seal (right) is appended to the product.

== Scope ==
The JAS originally covered only horticultural products such as fruit and vegetables, livestock feed, and processed products of horticultural origin. This has been extended to include livestock products such as animals, eggs and processed animal products such as cheese. This Standard does not currently cover apiculture (honey & bee products) or aquaculture. It also does not cover non-agricultural products such as textiles or health & beauty products. It does include the grading of lumber for import into Japan. JAS #1 lumber, often called J lumber, is the highest quality dimensional lumber; it has very few knots or blemishes and is very straight.

International organizations that can certify to these standards include the Organic Crop Improvement Association.

== Structure ==
Three groups of documents cover the Standard: JAS Law, the JAS Standards & and the technical criteria.
