= Enabavi =

Enabavi is a small village, 80 km north of Hyderabad in Hanamkonda district of India, with around 45 houses.

The village is noted for turning out to be Telangana's first organic village since 2006 in terms of agriculture and farming. The initiative was spearheaded by one of the elderly, Mr. Ponnam Mallaiah and supported by quite a few organizations like the "Centre for Sustainable Agriculture" in association with the "Centre for Rural Operations and Programmes Society" (CROPS). Paddy, vegetables, maize, corn, chillies, etc., are grown in this space.

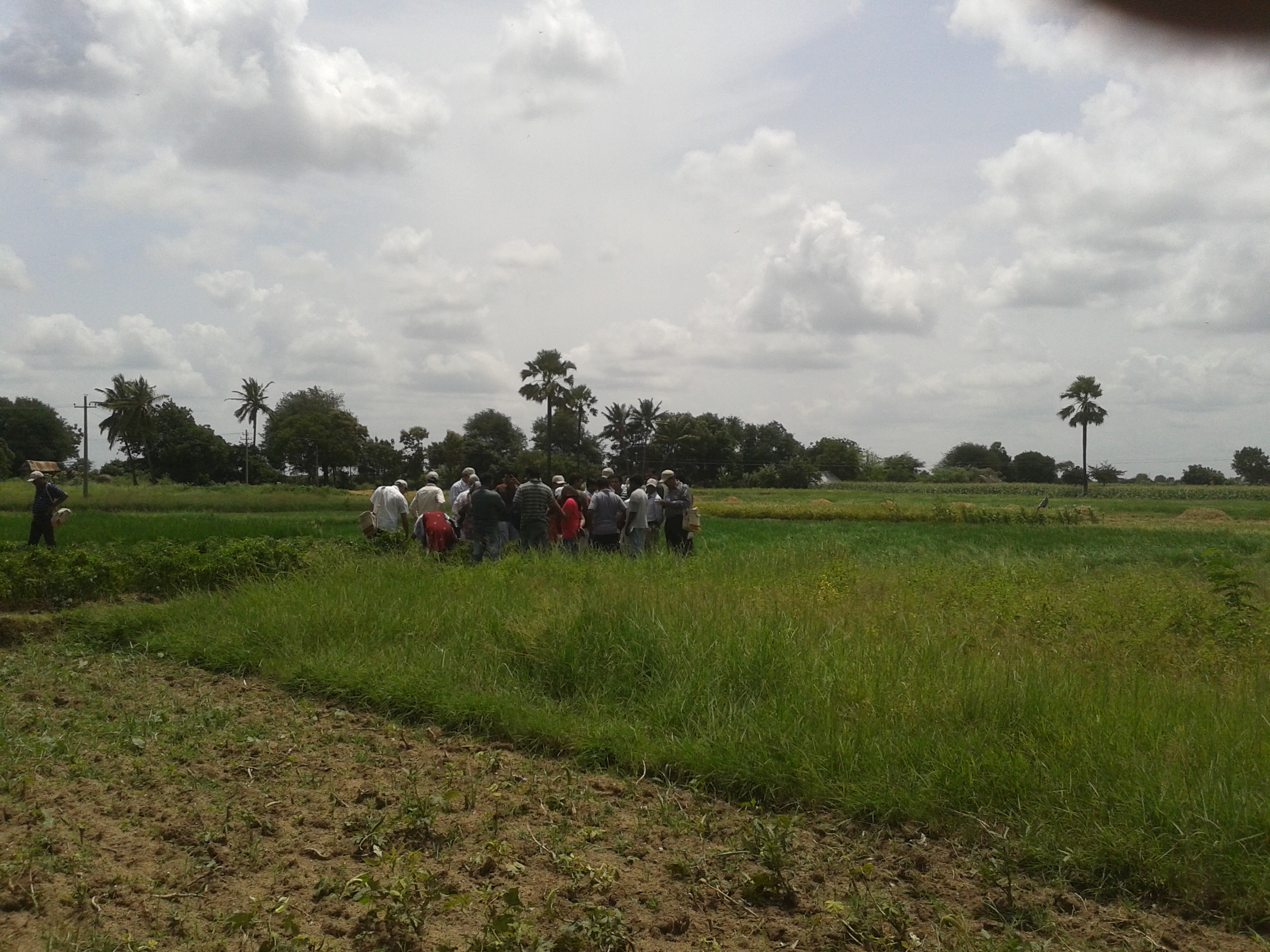
Scientists from Directorate of Rice Research (DRR) visiting crop fields in Enabavi

According to a CROPS volunteer who works from Jangaon, approx. 70,000 to 80,000 people have visited this village in the past few years including a team from Satyamev Jayate (TV series).

Mr. Ponnam Mallaiah received two awards for leading the activity and making it successful. One from Ramdev Baba's Foundation and the other from the National Bank for Agriculture and Rural Development.
