= Organic Crop Improvement Association =

Non-profit farming organization

O.C.I.A logo.

The Organic Crop Improvement Association (OCIA) is a member-owned, non-profit organization, which provides research, education and certification services to organic growers, processors and handlers around the world. OCIA certifies and verifies farm, livestock, processor/handlers, broker-traders, Community Grower Groups (CGGs), and Private Labels to various programs.

Bilingual organic certification seal.

With its headquarters in Lincoln, Nebraska, OCIA has regional and chapter offices in Canada, Mexico, Nicaragua, Japan, Guatemala, Peru and the U.S. OCIA was founded in 1985 (incorporated in Pennsylvania 1988) near Sherbrooke, Quebec, by a group of farmers, modeled on the "crop improvement associations" that came out of the Dust Bowl era. These associations started as informal meetings where farmers could discuss and ask advice about their land. In the 1970s as the organic movement developed, "organic" crop improvement associations were formed. OCIA mandated that farmers would hold farmers to one of the first international organic standards in 1985.

An international organization, OCIA continues to have a local approach with the organization largely being made up of local "chapters." The organization had members primarily in Canada and the U.S. until a group of Peruvian farmers joined the organization in 1988. Expansion throughout Latin America continued, and now OCIA has members across the world.

== Controversies ==
=== Certification company spin offs ===
OCIA grew the organic industry as new organic certification companies split off since its founding, including Global Organic Alliance, OneCert, TransCanada Organic Certification Services, and Quality Assurance International.

=== Suspension in China ===
OCIA was suspended from operating in China in 2010 for one year by the USDA after it reportedly used employees of a Chinese government agency to inspect state-controlled farms and food processing facilities, which constituted a conflict of interest.

In China, OCIA had joined forces with the Organic Food Development Corporation, an agency affiliated with the Chinese Ministry of Environmental Protection. The association kept a small staff — one or three people in Nanjing — while inspectors from the Chinese agency went out to farms and factories. Their findings were translated into English and sent to OCIA headquarters in Nebraska, where staff members reviewed the material and made the final decisions on certification.
