= Organic livestock farming =

Form of food production

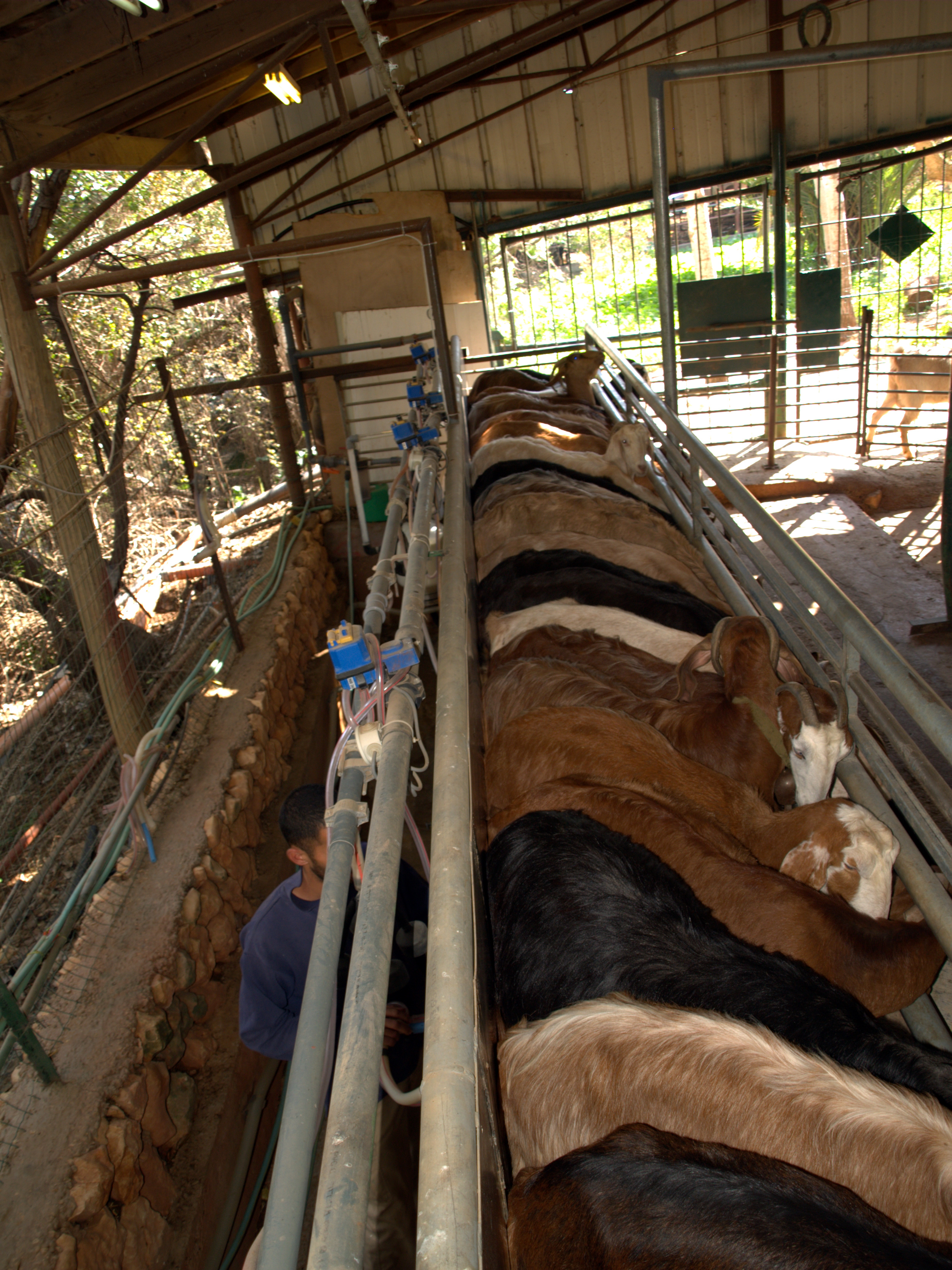
Goat milking on an organic farm in Israel

Organic livestock farming or organic livestock production is a means of food production with a large number of rules directed towards a high status of animal welfare, care for the environment, restricted use of medical drugs and the production of a healthy product without residues (pesticides or medical drugs).

== Certification ==
Definitions of "organic" vary. According to the USDA National Organic Program (NOP) Standards rules passed on October 22, 2002, certified organic livestock must come from a fully verifiable production system that collects information on the history of every animal in the program, including its breed history, veterinary care, and feed. To be certified as organic, all cattle should meet the following criteria:

- "Produced without genetic engineering, use of ionizing radiation or sewage sludge"
- Allowed continuous access to the outdoors except in specific conditions such as inclement weather
- Fed feed and raised on land that meets all organic crop production standards
- Never receive antibiotics
- Never receive growth hormones
- Never receive prohibited substances such as urea, manure, or arsenic-containing compounds
- Managed organically from last third of gestation onward

== Impact and efficiency ==
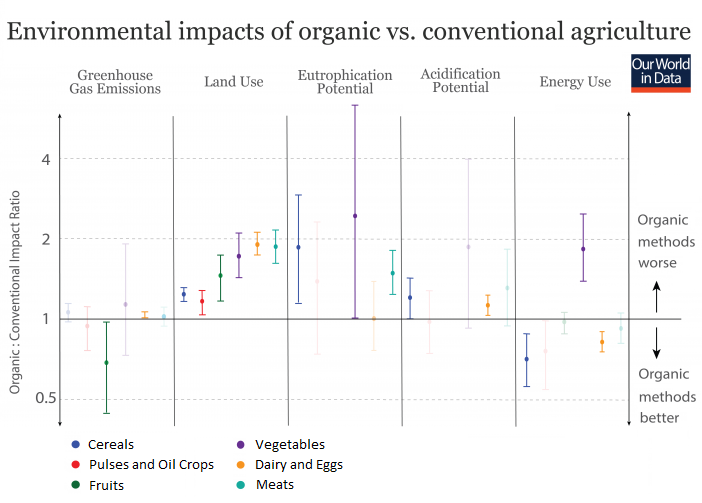
Comparison of the environmental impact of organic versus conventional agriculture. Organic livestock farming for meat (cyan) performs worse for land use and eutrophication potential. Organic livestock farming for dairy and eggs (orange) performs worse for greenhouse gas emissions, land use and acidification potential and better on energy use.

George Monbiot, a British environmentalist, has argued that counterintuitively, organic, pasture-fed beef and lamb are the world's most environmentally-damaging farm products. This is largely due to their comparatively inefficient use of land for pasture, rather than letting more land lie fallow or stay wild.

=== Land use ===
Professor Wolfgang Branscheid says that organic animal production is not good for the environment, as organic chicken requires twice as much land as "conventional" chicken and organic pork a quarter more. According to a calculation by Hudson Institute, organic beef requires three times as much land.

=== Productivity ===
A 2021 meta-analysis reported (i) a 14% lower productivity in organic dairy cattle, (ii) an 11% lower feed-use efficiency in organic dairy cattle and an 89% lower in poultry broilers, and (iii) reduced competition between feed and food use in organic dairy systems.

=== Greenhouse gas emissions ===
Extended grazing on open grasslands can stimulate plant growth that sequesters additional carbon dioxide. However grass-fed cows generally grow more slowly and are smaller at slaughter than grain-fed cows. Because they take longer to reach market weight and convert feed into meat less efficiently, their total lifetime emissions—particularly methane—are typically higher. As a result, grass-fed beef tends to have a higher carbon footprint per kilogram than grain-fed beef. A study by Daniel Blaustein-Rejto and colleagues estimated that emissions from grass-fed beef were approximately 20% higher than those from grain-fed cattle.

Compared to caged hens, free-range and organic hens produce fewer eggs and required more feed, which resulted in a carbon footprint around 16% higher per kilogram of egg.

=== Product quality ===
Honikel (1998) reviewed the limited number of studies on milk, beef, pork, and eggs, concluding that product quality characteristics—such as nutritional, hygienic, sensory, and technological factors—do not differ substantially between organic and conventional livestock farming.

=== Animal welfare ===
A 2003 literature review found no indications that health and welfare are worse in organic than in conventional livestock farming, with the exception of parasitic diseases. A 2020 review supports this assertion, adding that neither claims of inferior nor superior animal welfare in organic farming can be supported. For instance, organic dairy farms face similar challenges as conventional dairy farms, such as mastitis and lameness. However, organic pigs carry higher parasitic loads than conventional indoor pigs on average.

== See also ==
- Organic aquaculture
- Organic egg production
- Organic milk
