= Wedge Community Co-op =

Coordinates: 44°57′41.28″N 93°17′15.83″W

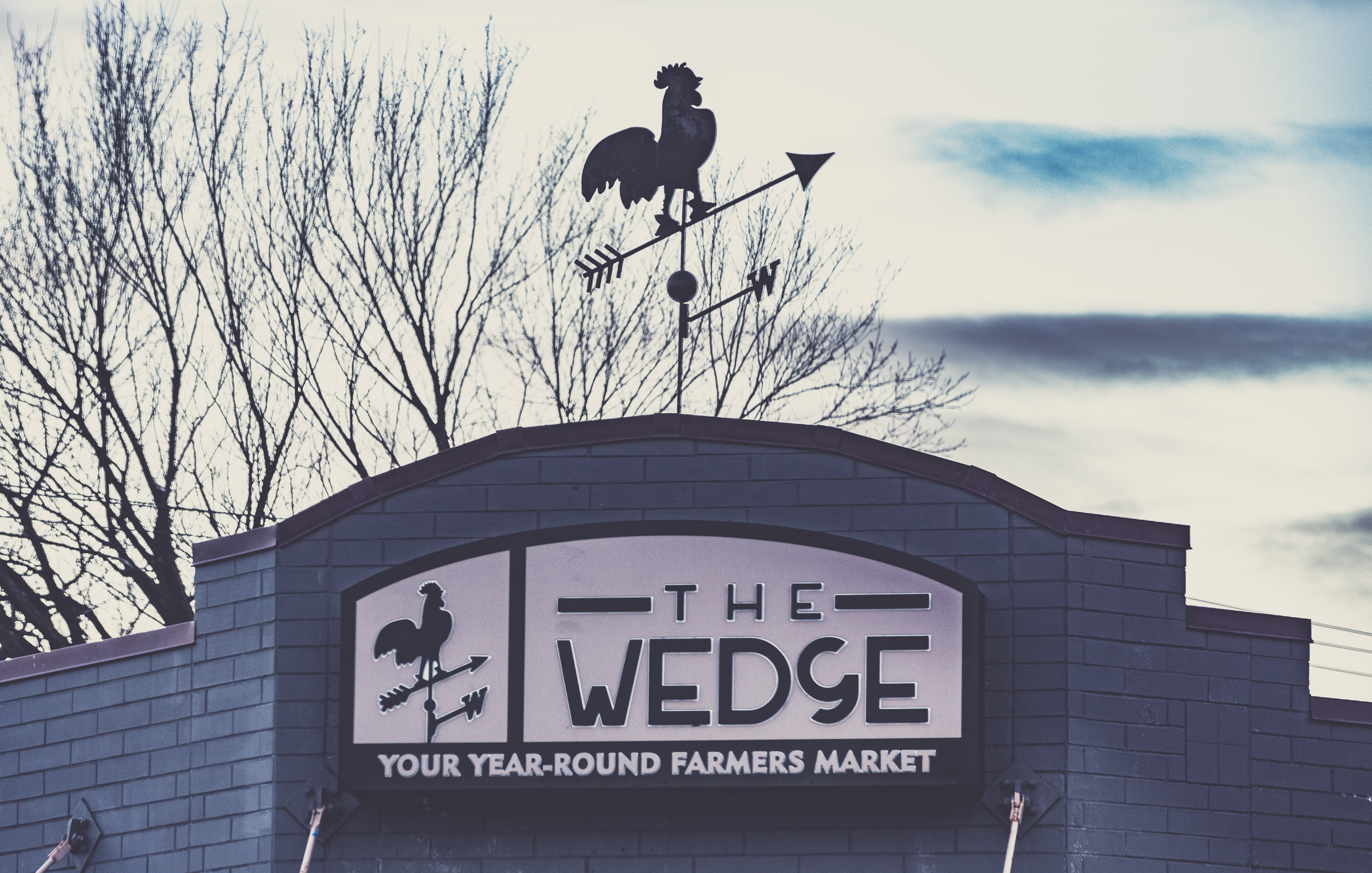
- Type: Consumers' cooperative
- Founded: 1974
- Headquarters: Minneapolis, Minnesota, United States
- Products: Organic food
- Revenue: $36 million
- Members: 25,000
- Number of employees: 270
- Website: wedge.coop

The Wedge Community Co-op or The Wedge is a food cooperative located in Minneapolis, Minnesota. Located at 2105 Lyndale Avenue South, the Wedge derives its name from the popular nickname for the Lowry Hill East neighborhood, called "The Wedge" due to its shape. The Wedge is a member of the NCG.

== History ==
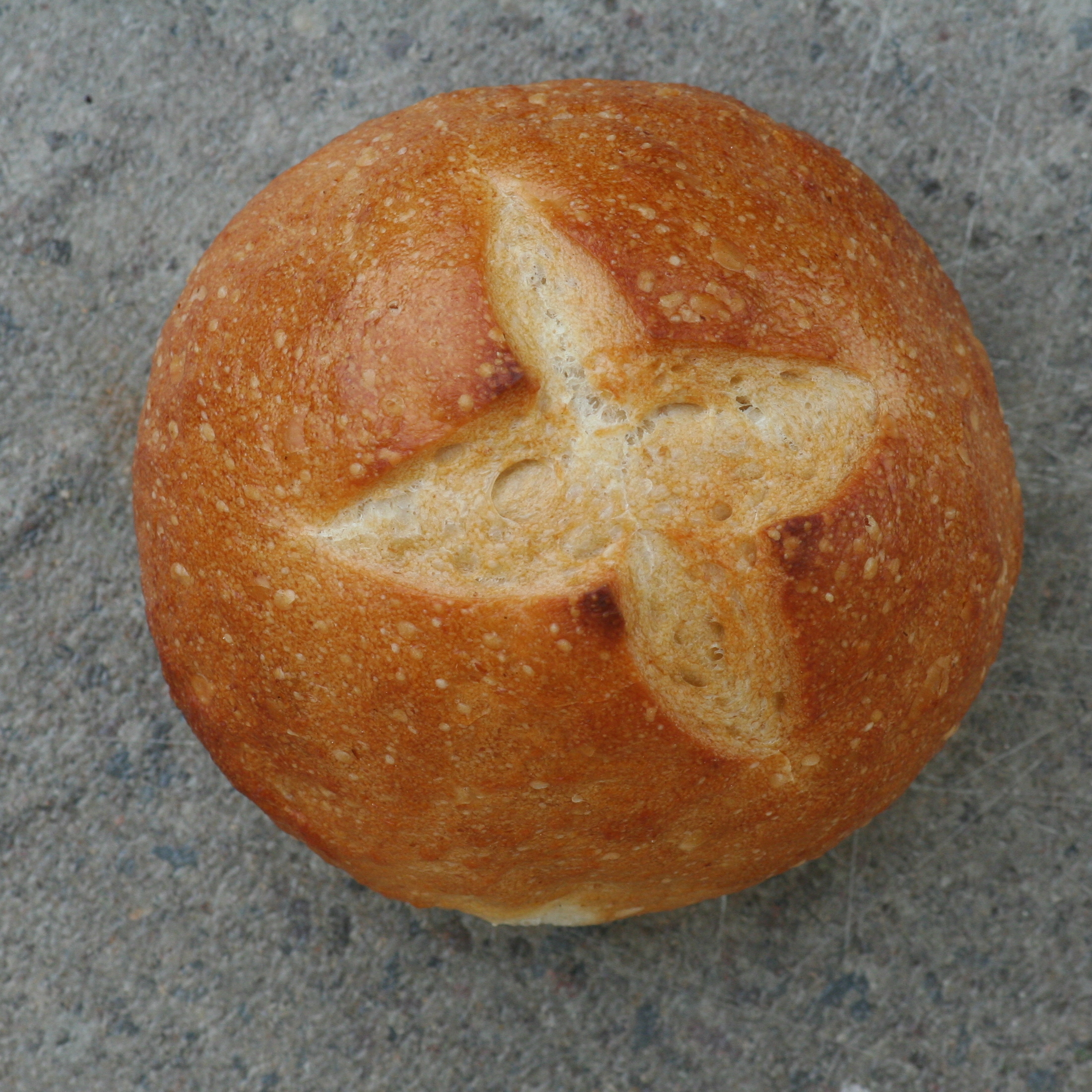
A sourdough bread from the Wedge Co-op in Minneapolis.

The Wedge was formed in 1974 in a basement apartment on Franklin Avenue in Minneapolis. It was formed after a group of neighbors met that summer to organize a cooperative store to provide themselves with whole and natural foods, preferably in bulk quantities to save money. In 1979, the Wedge moved to Lyndale Avenue. Wedge had a member labor program in place until 1992, when it built a new store in the lot adjacent to its store. An addition which doubled the retail space was built in 1997.

The Wedge was the first certified organic grocery store in Minnesota.

In 2015, the Wedge became the first consumer co-op in the Twin Cities metro area to unionize.

The next year, the members voted to consolidate with Linden Hills Co-op, forming the Twin Cities Co-op Partnership (TCCP). The combined entity had 25,000 members and employed over 500 employees.

== Warehouse ==
The Wedge Co-op has a wholesale distributor, the Co-op Partners Warehouse, which services retail co-ops, natural food stores and restaurants in the Upper Midwest. Co-op Partners Warehouse began as a produce wholesaler and has since expanded into organic milk, cheese and yogurt; soy products, fresh juices and smoothies; and a selection of dry grocery items. In April 2012, employees of the Wedge's Co-op Partners Warehouse formed a union to voice their dissatisfaction with wages and management decisions. In November 2015, employees of the Wedge Lyndale location voted 76 to 31 to unionize its retail location.

== Gardens of Eagan ==
In January 2008, the co-op leased 'Gardens of Eagan', one of the oldest local certified organic produce farms in the Twin Cities area. The co-op has the option to purchase the land after five years, and has been running the operation since summer 2008. The Wedge listed farm up for sale in April 2015, deciding to concentrate on its retail operations.

== Organic Field School ==
In 2008, the Wedge Co-op formed the Organic Field School (OFS) at Gardens of Eagan. OFS is an on-farm facility with a focus on education and research for farmers, educators, policy makers and the public.

== WedgeShare ==
Since 1997, The Wedge has administered a charitable giving program based on the 7th cooperative principle. The donations are given to community groups chosen by the Wedge membership by vote. In its history, WedgeShare has given nearly $240,000 to non-profit organizations.

== IS4C ==
IS4C or Integrated Systems for Co-ops is a free web-based point of sale software for retail stores initially developed by Tak Tang for The Wedge. The software utilizes an SQL database and enables tracking of customer purchase totals that cooperatives use in calculating patronage refunds for their members. IS4C and Fannie, its backend management system were written almost exclusively in PHP. IS4C software is used primarily by food cooperatives and has been released under the GNU General Public License. Versions of IS4C have been adopted by Whole Foods Co-op, People's Food Co-op, Alberta Cooperative Grocery, River Valley Co-op, and the Clintonville Community Market Co-op in Columbus, Ohio.

== See also ==
- List of food cooperatives
