= Organic Foods Production Act of 1990 =

U.S. legislation that established an agricultural program

The Organic Foods Production Act of 1990 (OFPA) (Title 21 of Food, Agriculture, Conservation, and Trade Act of 1990, codified at 7 U.S.C. ch. 94, 7 U.S.C. § 6501 et seq.) authorizes a National Organic Program (NOP) to be administered by USDA's Agricultural Marketing Service (AMS). The program is based on federal regulations that define standard organic farming practices and on a "national list" of acceptable organic production inputs. Private and state certifiers are responsible for visiting producers, processors, and handlers to certify that their operations abide by the production standards. Once certified, these operations may affix the USDA Organic Seal to their products.

The USDA has established four distinct categories for labeling organic products—100 percent organic, organic, "made with" organic ingredients, and specific organic ingredients—and only 100 percent organic and organic categories can use the USDA Organic Seal. In the U.S., it is illegal for anyone to use the word "organic" on a product if it does not meet the standards set in the law and regulations. The regulations under the OFPA are intended to set uniform minimum standards for organic production. However, states may adopt additional requirements after review and approval by USDA. AMS re-accredits certifying agents every 5 years, maintains federal oversight to assure truth in labeling, and provides assurance that imported organic products have been produced under standards that are equivalent to the U.S. standards.

The act calls for the establishment of a 15-member National Organic Standards Board (NOSB) to "assist in the development of standards for substances to be used in organic production" (i.e., the National List) and to "provide recommendations to the Secretary regarding implementation" of the act. Congress expected implementation to be complete and the program in operation by October 1, 1993. However, the Board was hampered at the beginning by a lack of funds, among other factors. Neither departmental nor appropriated funds were available in fiscal year 1991; in fiscal years 1992 and 1993, the USDA made $120,000 available under the Federal Advisory Committee Act. Beginning in fiscal year 1994, Congress appropriated funds for AMS's National Organic Program activities at about $500,000 annually. The 1999 fiscal year Administration budget requests slightly more than $1 million to assist the implementation of the new program.

During the period from June 1994 to September 1996, the NOSB submitted its recommendations for national standards and the National List to USDA's National Organic Program staff. The staff drafted the proposed rule based on the Board's recommendations but not in complete conformity with them. The proposed rule appeared in the Federal Register on December 16, 1997. Because of the heavy response to the proposal, USDA extended the comment period from mid-March through the end of April 1998.

== Organic certification ==
The organic certification process makes sure that growers and handlers that claim to be organic are abiding by strict laws and regulations set by the Organic Foods Production Act. It focuses on the methods and materials used by producers. Everyone, from producers to handlers of organic products, must be certified to sell products labeled as “organic”. There are two exceptions to this rule. Growers whose gross income is less than $5,000 and retailers are excused from certification. Producers may also apply for a split operation if only a part of the operation is organic. In this case there must be a clear separation of the different sections and separate records must be kept.

Certification begins with the submission of an Organic System Plan to a USDA-accredited certification program. The Organic System Plan requires detailed growing, handling and materials procedures and at least five years of records. Annual on-site inspections confirm production operations and fees are collected to pay for the certification program.

== Crop production standards ==
For crops to be certified organic they must follow strict guidelines:

- Must be grown on land that has been free of prohibited pesticides and substances for at least three years before harvest
- Consistent careful management of soil fertility
- Correct dispersal of manure
- Use prevention as the first form of pest control
- Must have buffer zones that protect from the flow of prohibited substances

== Livestock standards ==
Livestock standards are implemented to maintain both organic standards for consumers and good living conditions for the animals. In order for livestock to be certified organic:

- Animals must be fed organic food
- Growth hormones, promoters or plastic pellets in food are prohibited
- Vitamins and minerals are permitted
- Animals cannot be overcrowded
- Animals must be given allotted time outdoors in direct sunlight
- Antibiotics may not be used routinely
- Records must be kept on these practices for each animal or flock of animals

== Processing, labeling, and packaging standards ==
Organic agriculture aims to optimize the health and productivity of soil life, plants, animals and people. For this to happen, processors, labelers and packagers of these organic products must be responsible for following regulations that keep the integrity of the food they deal with. During the processing of the food, there are specific additives that are prohibited. These are detailed in the National List, whose purpose is to clarify exactly which materials are acceptable and not acceptable throughout the organic food process. Strict rules for packaging state that organic products cannot be packaged in anything that contains or has been in contact with synthetic fungicides, fumigants, and preservatives.

In order for a processed food to be labeled organic, its handler must be certified organic and ninety-five percent of its ingredients must be produced organically. This percentage is determined by the weight of the final product, excluding water and salt. The Secretary of Agriculture establishes whether imported foods may be labeled organic based on whether they have followed regulations that meet the standards of the National Organic Program.

== History ==
Congress passed the Act in response to requests and petitions from several organic industries and national environmental groups.

The trail to the Organic Foods Production Act of 1990 began in 1985 when the President, Joseph Dunsmore, Organic Farms, Inc., at the time the world's largest distributor of organic products, tossed a letter from Sandra Marquardt at the National Coalition Against the Misuse of Pesticides (NCAMP), now Beyond Pesticides onto Sales and Marketing Representative Gail Black's desk. The letter from NCAMP asked Organic Farms, Inc to join their organization. Mr. Dunsmore asked Ms. Black to write to NCAMP and advise NCAMP that organic farming gives practical implementation to their environmental concerns and that NCAMP should be serving organic food at their conference. NCAMP agreed and Organic Farms, Inc. began a collaboration to supply organic food to NCAMP's upcoming conference.

Organic food at NCAMP's national conference became an overnight hit. Other National Environmental organizations began wanting organic food at their conferences. The following is a short list of National Environmental organizations that began the trail to the Organic Foods Production Act of 1990 after the National Coalition's conference in 1985.

The International Alliance for Sustainable Agriculture's (IASA) President Terry Gips attended the NCAMP conference and understood the correlation between organic farming and the environment. IASA included organic food and a presentation at the IASA conference. Next, the Pesticide Action Network (PAN) and their Dirty Dozen Campaign collaborated with Ms. Black to create an organic buffet for the Senate, including presentations from organic farmers, manufacturers (including Ben and Jerry ice cream), and organic certification organizations. Senator Patrick Leahy, Chairman of the Senate Agriculture Committee attended the Pesticide Action Network presentation and was inspired to write the Organic Foods Production Act into the 1990 Farm Bill.

The Organic Foods Production Association of North America (OFPANA; now the Organic Trade Association), National Association of State Departments of Agriculture, the American Farm Bureau Federation, National Coalition for the Misuse of Pesticides (NCAMP), and Pesticide Action Network (PAN) were at the forefront of establishing a need for this legislation and that there is a viable market to be met. Ms. Black introduced the concept to the Center for Science in the Public Interest and they joined in as well.

These groups gave a variety of reasons for seeking federal regulation.

First, the organic industry is concerned that the multiplicity of standards might cause consumer confusion and undermine confidence in the integrity of organic products over the long term.

Second, manufacturers of multi-ingredient organic food products reported labeling and marketing difficulties due to the differences among standards.

Third, in the absence of federal organic standards for meat, poultry, and seafood, USDA's Food Safety and Inspection Service (which is responsible for meat and poultry inspection) and the Food and Drug Administration (which is responsible for seafood inspection) do not permit these products to be labeled as organically produced, thus limiting consumer choice and the industry's market opportunities.

Finally, industry analysts assert that the lack of a consistent U.S. organic standard is complicating and slowing access to a potentially lucrative international organic market.

== See also ==
- 1990 in the United States
- WIC Farmers' Market Nutrition Act of 1992
