= National Co+op Grocers =

Business services cooperative

- Company type: Business services cooperative
- Founded: 1999
- Headquarters: Saint Paul, Minnesota, United States
- Website: ncg.coop

National Co+op Grocers (NCG) is a business services cooperative for retail cooperative grocery stores located throughout the United States. NCG offers franchise-like services to food co-ops that help businesses optimize operational and marketing resources, offering coordinated branding; access to loans through a partnership with Capital Impact Partners; and bulk buying rates through the United Natural Foods (UNFI).

NCG's headquarters are located in Saint Paul, Minnesota, home to a number of Food Cooperatives, such as Wedge Community Co-op, as well as the historic Minnesota Food Cooperative Wars.

As of 2025, NCG represents 166 independent food cooperatives operating 240 stores in 39 states with combined annual sales of over $2.8 billion and over 1.3 million consumer owners.

== See also ==
- List of food cooperatives
