= George Street Co-op =

Grocery co-op in New Jersey

Coordinates: 40°29′31.1″N 74°26′41.85″W

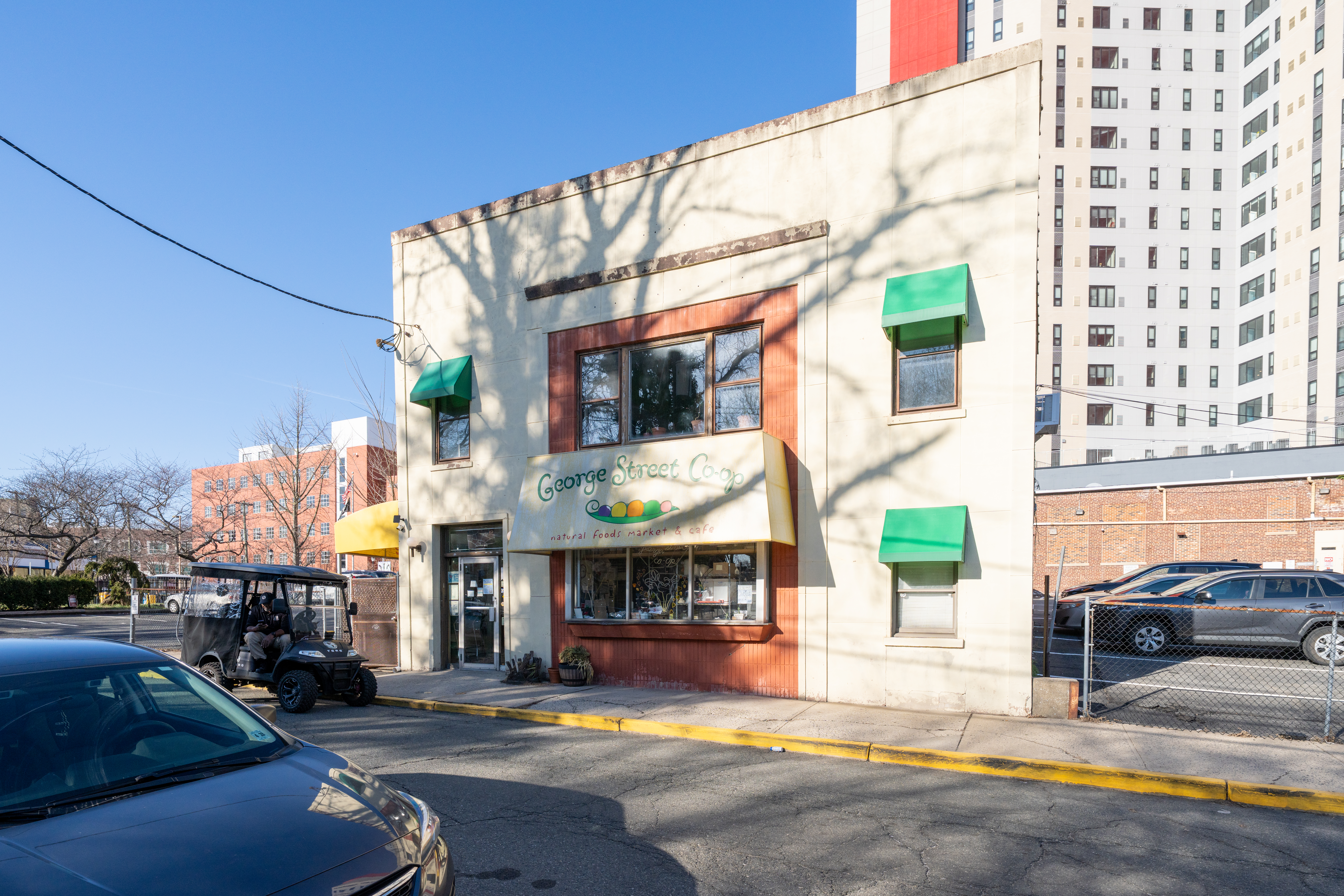
- Type: Food cooperative
- Founded: 1973
- Headquarters: New Brunswick, New Jersey, United States
- Products: Organic food
- Website: www.georgestreetcoop.com

The George Street Co-op is a food cooperative located in New Brunswick, New Jersey. The George Street Co-op runs a retail store at 89 Morris Street, selling foods and select hygiene and household products to the general public and to its membership.

== History ==
The George Street Co-op was formed in 1973 when ten people from the Rutgers Vegetarian Club started a buying club out of a garage near George Street in New Brunswick. A year later, the Co-op moved to a new building on George Street and opened a small retail store. In May 1988, the George Street Co-op purchased and moved into a new building at 89 Morris Street.

== Operations ==
The Co-op sells vegetarian, organic, local food, naturally grown and fair trade products. This focus on vegetarian fare extends to The Namaste Cafe upstairs. The space upstairs also serves as a community space for everything from yoga classes to comedy shows.
