= Identity preservation =

Identity preservation is the practice of tracking the details of agricultural shipments so that the specific characteristics of each shipment is known. Identity preserved (IP) is the designation given to such bulk commodities marketed in a manner that isolates and preserves the identity of a shipment, presumably because of unique characteristics that have value otherwise lost through commingling during normal storage, handling and shipping procedures. The concept of IP has been accorded greater importance with the introduction of genetically modified organisms into agriculture.

Technical and managerial techniques are used to track and document the paths that agricultural products move in the production process. A fully integrated IP system might track and document a commodity's seed characteristics, initial planting, growing conditions, harvesting, shipping, storage, processing, packaging, and ultimate sale to the consumer. Separating organic products from conventionally raised ones is one type of IP system. IP systems are a central component of value chains.
