= National Organic Program =

U.S. federal regulatory framework

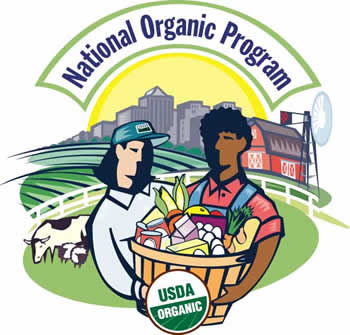
The National Organic Program (run by the USDA) is responsible for the labeling of foods as "organic".

USDA organic seal

The National Organic Program (NOP) is the federal regulatory framework in the United States governing organic food. It is also the name of the United States Department of Agriculture (USDA) Agricultural Marketing Service (AMS) program responsible for administering and enforcing the regulatory framework. The core mission of the NOP is to protect the integrity of the USDA organic seal. The seal is used for products adhering to USDA standards that contain at least 95% organic ingredients.

The Organic Foods Production Act of 1990 (OFPA) required that the USDA develop national standards for organic products, and the final rule establishing the NOP was first published in the Federal Register in 2000 and is codified in the Code of Federal Regulations at 7 CFR 205.

== Overview ==
The NOP covers fresh and processed agricultural food products.

The National Organic Program grew from fewer than twelve total employees in 2008 to approximately 37 in 2019 and 82 in January 2023. This growth has been due to increased annual funding appropriated by Congress since 2018. The key activities of the National Organic Program are to:

- Maintain the Organic Integrity Database, a listing of certified organic operations, and help new farmers and business learn how to get certified
- Develop regulations and guidance on organic standards
- Manage the National List of Allowed and Prohibited Substances
- Accredit certifying agents to certify organic producers and handlers
- Facilitate the work of the National Organic Standards Board (NOSB), a Federal Advisory Committee
- Provide training to certifying agents, USDA staff, and other stakeholders
- Engage and serve the organic community
- Investigate alleged violations of the organic standards and bring violators to justice

== Regulation ==
The Organic Foods Production Act of 1990 "requires the Secretary of Agriculture to establish a National List of Allowed and Prohibited Substances which identifies synthetic substances that may be used, and the nonsynthetic substances that cannot be used, in organic production and handling operations." Under this act, the Secretary of Agriculture promulgated regulations establishing the National Organic Program (NOP) in 2000. It restricts the use of the term "organic" to certified organic producers (excepting growers selling under $5,000 a year, who must still comply and submit to a records audit if requested, but do not have to formally apply). Certification is handled by state, non-profit and private agencies that have been approved by the USDA

NOP regulations cover in detail all aspects of food production, processing, delivery and retail sale. Under the NOP, farmers and food processors who wish to use the word organic in reference to their businesses and products, must be certified organic. Producers with annual sales not exceeding US$5,000 are exempted and do not require certification (however, they must still follow NOP standards, including keeping records and submitting to a production audit if requested, and cannot use the term certified organic).

Products labeled "100 percent organic", "organic", or "made with organic ingredients" must adhere to the Organic Production and Handling Requirements outlined in the regulation 7 CFR Part 205. A USDA Organic seal identifies raw, fresh, and processed products with at least 95% organic ingredients. A product that has not been certified organic by a USDA-authorized certifying agent may not bear the USDA organic seal. Products containing at least 70 percent organically produced ingredients may include a “Made with Organic” label to specify up to three ingredients or ingredient categories. They can not use the USDA organic seal or represent that the finished product is organic. Misuse of the USDA Organic seal on a product may lead to USDA compliance and enforcement actions, including fines up to $11,000 per violation. Misuse may also lead to the suspension or revocation of the violator's organic certificate.

=== USDA accredited certifying agents ===
As of 2023, there are about 75 USDA accredited certifying agents (ACA), some of which also have satellite offices.

The NOP provides organic producers with resources to assist in becoming certified organic, including an organic program handbook (which includes guidance, certifier instructions, and policy memos), fact sheets, online training modules, and ways to identify accredited certifying agents.

In 2022, USDA announced the Organic Transition Initiative to further support transitioning farmers.

=== International equivalency ===
Beginning in 2009, the US implemented an international organic equivalency agreement with Canada. In 2012 they implemented an agreement with the European Union (EU-Eco-regulation), and in 2014 with Japan and Korea. Under these agreements, USDA-certified organic products do not need to meet a separate set of standards before being exported to the market, and vice versa, as equivalency agreements essentially imply that the two sets of standards are equivalent despite a few small differences and do not require any additional certification for the specific market. These agreements streamline certification requirements and increase access to new market opportunities, while maintaining organic integrity of the respective markets.

== Support and assistance ==
The USDA Natural Resources Conservation Service (NRCS) Environmental Quality Incentives (EQIP) Organic Program provides financial and technical assistance to certain organic producers for implementing conservation practices.

== Controversy ==
Certain types of agricultural systems have generated disagreement about whether they can be included in the certification. One of these systems is hydroponics, which do not rely on soil for production. In the regulatory process, hydroponics has been subdivided into the following operations:

- Hydroponics, growing plants in a water and nutrient solution usually in a substrate such as coconut coir
- Aquaponics, which combines aquaculture, raising aquatic animals, and traditional hydroponics
- Aeroponics, which mist or spray the roots of the plants with water that contains water soluble nutrients.

The topic first came up at a meeting of the NOSB in April, 1995, which briefly stated that "Hydroponic production in soilless media to be labeled organically produced shall be allowed, if all provisions of the OFPA have been met." The NOSB has made several proposals and recommendations since then but no action was taken until the fall 2017 NOSB meeting. At that meeting, the NOSB was only able to pass a motion to prohibit aeroponic systems in organic production. In 2018, the USDA issued a clarifying statement that the "certification of hydroponic, aquaponic, and aeroponic operations is allowed under the USDA organic regulations" and would consider the NOSB recommendation on aeroponics.

== See also ==
- Organic certification
- List of organic food topics
