= Organic certification =

Certification for producers of organic food

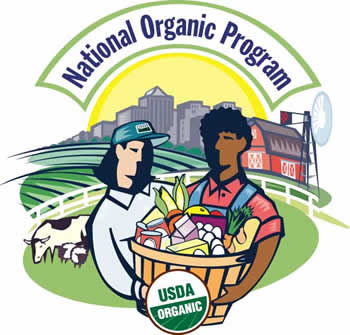
The National Organic Program (run by the USDA) is in charge of labeling foods organic. In order for a food to be labeled "organic" it must meet the USDA's organic standards.

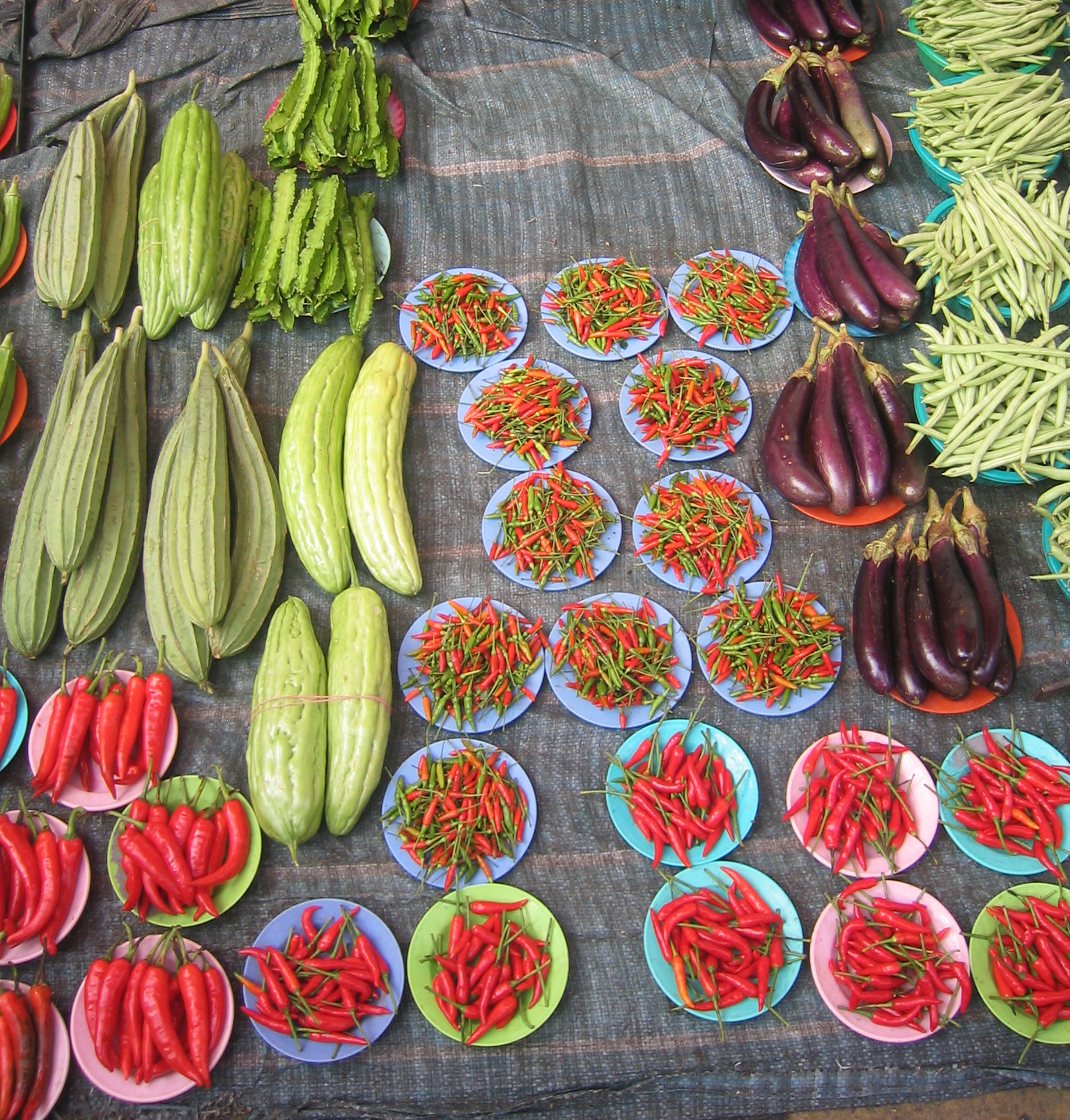
Organic vegetables at a farmers' market in Argentina

Organic certification is a certification process for producers of organic food and other agricultural products. In general, businesses directly involved in food production can be certified, including seed suppliers, farmers, food processors, retailers and restaurants. A lesser known counterpart is certification for organic textiles (or organic clothing) that includes certification of textile products made from organically grown fibres.

Requirements vary from country to country (List of countries with organic agriculture regulation), and generally involve a set of production standards for growing, storage, processing, packaging and shipping that include:

- avoidance of synthetic chemical inputs (e.g. fertilizer, pesticides, antibiotics, food additives), irradiation, and the use of sewage sludge;
- avoidance of genetically modified seed;
- use of farmland that has been free from prohibited chemical inputs for a specified period, often three or more years;
- for livestock, adhering to specific requirements for feed, housing, and breeding;
- keeping detailed written production and sales records (audit trail);
- maintaining strict physical separation of organic products from non-certified products;
- undergoing periodic on-site inspections.

In some countries, certification is overseen by the government, and commercial use of the term organic is legally restricted. Certified organic producers are also subject to the same agricultural, food safety and other government regulations that apply to non-certified producers.

Certified organic foods are not necessarily pesticide-free, as certain pesticides are allowed.

== Purpose ==
Organic certification addresses a growing worldwide demand for organic food. It is intended to assure quality, prevent fraud, and to promote commerce. While such certification was not necessary in the early days of the organic movement, when small farmers would sell their produce directly at farmers' markets, as organics have grown in popularity, more and more consumers are purchasing organic food through traditional channels, such as supermarkets. As such, consumers must rely on third-party regulatory certification.

For organic producers, certification identifies suppliers of products approved for use in certified operations. For consumers, "certified organic" serves as a product assurance, similar to "low fat", "100% whole wheat", or "no artificial preservatives".

Certification is essentially aimed at regulating and facilitating the sale of organic products to consumers. Individual certification bodies have their own service marks, which can act as branding to consumers—a certifier may promote the high consumer recognition value of its logo as a marketing advantage to producers.

== Methods ==
=== Third-party ===
In third-party certification, a farm or the processing of agricultural produce is certified in accordance with national or international organic standards by an accredited organic certification agency. To certify a farm, the farmer is typically required to engage in a number of new activities, in addition to normal farming operations:

- Study the organic standards, which cover in specific detail what is and is not allowed for every aspect of farming, including storage, transport and sale.
- Compliance — farm facilities and production methods must comply with the standards, which may involve modifying facilities, sourcing and changing suppliers, etc.
- Documentation — extensive paperwork is required, detailing farm history and current set-up, and usually including results of soil and water tests.
- Planning — a written annual production plan must be submitted, detailing everything from seed to sale: seed sources, field and crop locations, fertilization and pest control activities, harvest methods, storage locations, etc.
- Inspection — annual on-farm inspections are required, with a physical tour, examination of records, and an oral interview. The vast majority of the inspections are pre-scheduled visits.
- Fee — an annual inspection/certification fee (currently starting at $400–$2,000/year, in the US and Canada, depending on the agency and the size of the operation). There are financial assistance programs for qualifying certified operations.
- Record-keeping — written, day-to-day farming and marketing records, covering all activities, must be available for inspection at any time.

In addition, short-notice or surprise inspections can be made, and specific tests (e.g. soil, water, plant tissue) may be requested.

For first-time farm certification, the soil must meet basic requirements of being free from use of prohibited substances (synthetic chemicals, etc.) for a number of years. A conventional farm must adhere to organic standards during this period, which often lasts two to three years. This is known as being in transition.

Certification for operations other than farms follows a similar process. The focus is on the quality of ingredients and other inputs, and processing and handling conditions. A transport company would be required to detail the use and maintenance of its vehicles, storage facilities, containers, and so forth. A restaurant would have its premises inspected and its suppliers verified as certified organic.

=== Participatory ===
Participatory Guarantee Systems (PGS) represent an alternative to third party certification, especially adapted to local markets and short supply chains. They can also complement third party certification with a private label that brings additional guarantees and transparency. PGS enable the direct participation of producers, consumers and other stakeholders in:

- the choice and definition of the standards
- the development and implementation of certification procedures
- the certification decisions

Participatory Guarantee Systems are also referred to as "participatory certification".

=== Alternative certification options ===
The word organic is central to the certification (and organic food marketing) process, and this is also questioned by some. Where organic laws exist, producers cannot use the term legally without certification. To bypass this legal requirement for certification, various alternative certification approaches, using currently undefined terms like "authentic" and "natural", are emerging. In the US, motivated by the cost and legal requirements of certification (as of Oct. 2002), the private farmer-to-farmer association, Certified Naturally Grown, offers a "non-profit alternative eco-labelling program for small farms that grow using USDA Organic methods but are not a part of the USDA Certified Organic program."

In the UK, the interests of smaller-scale growers who use "natural" growing methods are represented by the Wholesome Food Association, which issues a symbol based largely on trust and peer-to-peer inspection.

== Organic certification and the Millennium Development Goals (MDGs) ==
Organic certification, as well as fair trade certification, has the potential to directly and indirectly contribute to the achievement of some of the Millennium Development Goals (MDGs), which are the eight international development goals that were established following the Millennium Summit of the United Nations in 2000, with all United Nations member states committed to help achieve the MDGs by 2015. With the growth of ethical consumerism in developed countries, imports of eco-friendly and socially certified produce from the poor in developing countries have increased, which could contribute towards the achievement of the MDGs. A study by Setboonsarng (2008) reveals that organic certification substantially contributes to MDG1 (poverty and hunger) and MDG7 (environmental sustainability) by way of premium prices and better market access, among others. This study concludes that for this market-based development scheme to broaden its poverty impacts, public sector support in harmonizing standards, building up the capacity of certifiers, developing infrastructure development, and innovating alternative certification systems will be required.

== International food standards ==
The Codex Alimentarius was established in November 1961 by the Food and Agriculture Organization of the United Nations and the World Health Organization. The Commission's main goals are to protect the health of consumers and ensure fair practices in the international food trade. The Codex Alimentarius is recognized by the World Trade Organization as an international reference point for the resolution of disputes concerning food safety and consumer protection. One of their goals is to provide proper food labelling (general standard, guidelines on nutrition labelling, guidelines on labelling claims).

== National variations ==
Organic Certification Labels
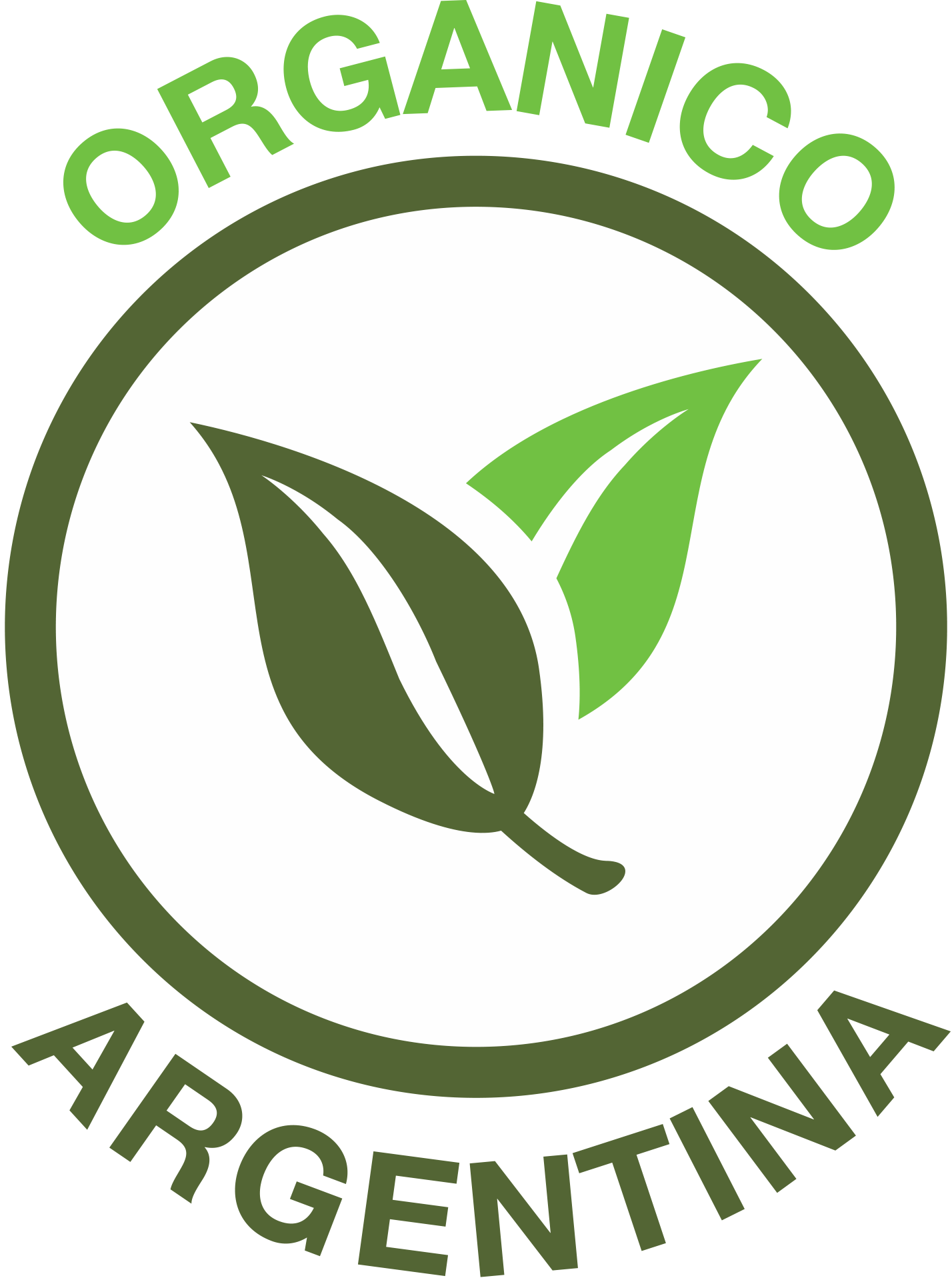
Argentina
Australia
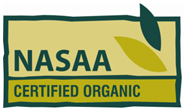
Australia
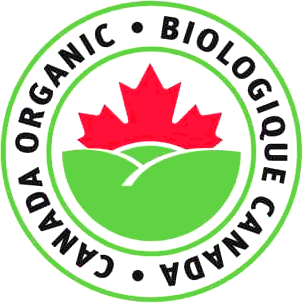
Canada
European Union
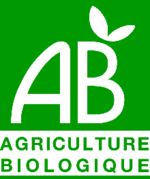
France
Germany

India
Japan

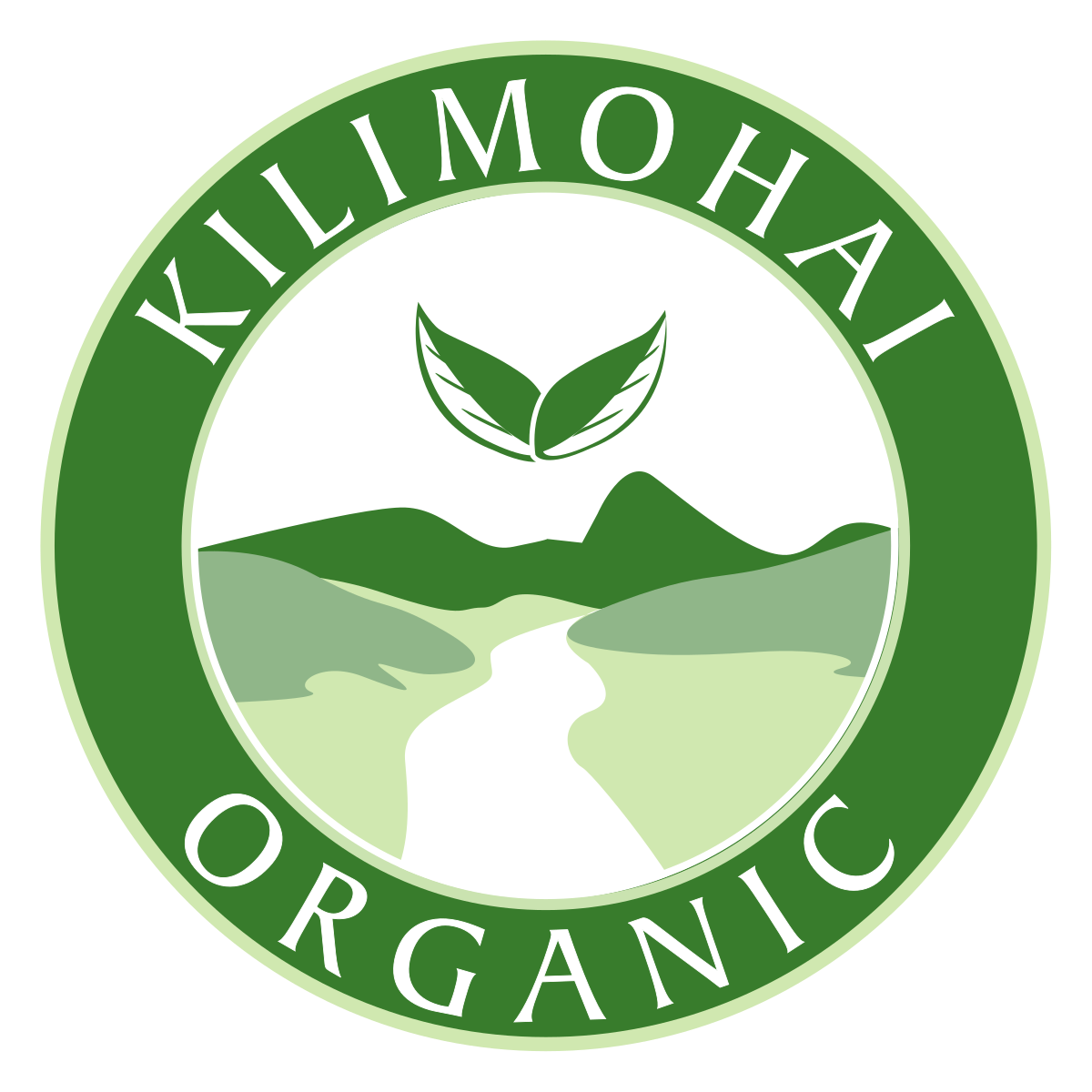
Kenya - Also East Africa Region

Kenya, Also East Africa Region

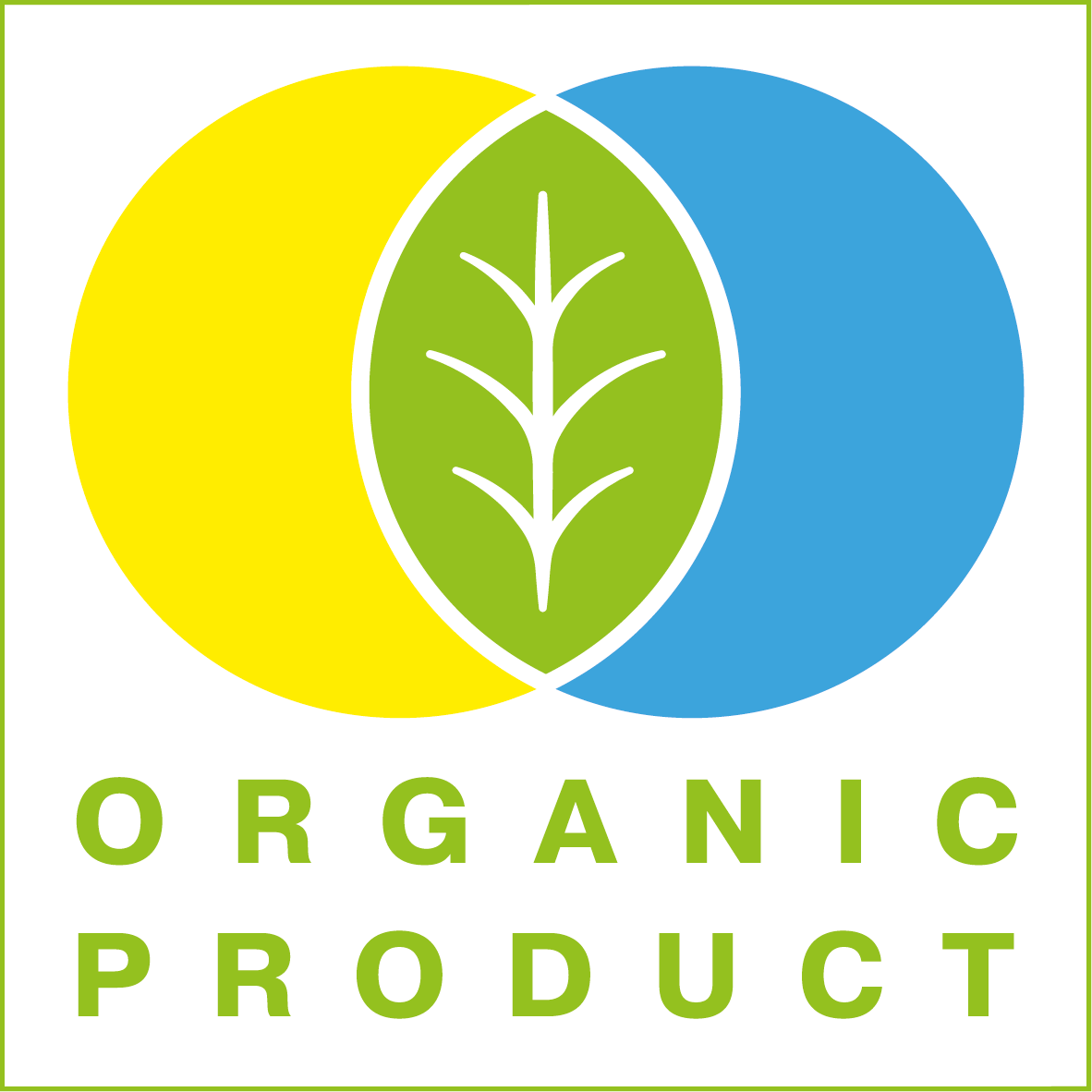
Ukrainian State logo for organic products

Ukraine
United States

In some countries, organic standards are formulated and overseen by the government. The United States, the European Union, Canada and Japan have comprehensive organic legislation, and the term "organic" may be used only by certified producers. Being able to put the word "organic" on a food product is a valuable marketing advantage in today's consumer market, but does not guarantee the product is legitimately organic. Certification is intended to protect consumers from misuse of the term, and make buying organics easy. However, the organic labeling made possible by certification itself usually requires explanation. In countries without organic laws, government guidelines may or may not exist, while certification is handled by non-profit organizations and private companies.

Internationally, equivalency negotiations are underway, and some agreements are already in place, to harmonize certification between countries, facilitating international trade. There are also international certification bodies, including members of the International Federation of Organic Agriculture Movements (IFOAM) working on harmonization efforts. Where formal agreements do not exist between countries, organic product for export is often certified by agencies from the importing countries, who may establish permanent foreign offices for this purpose. In 2011 IFOAM introduced a new program—the IFOAM Family of Standards—that attempts to simplify harmonization. The vision is to establish the use of one single global reference (the COROS) to access the quality of standards rather than focusing on bilateral agreements.

The Certcost was a research project that conducted research and prepared reports about the certification of organic food. The project was supported by the European Commission and was active from 2008 to 2011. The website will be available until 2016.

=== North America ===
==== United States ====
In the United States, "organic" is a labeling term for food or agricultural products ("food, feed or fiber") that have been produced according to USDA organic regulations, which define standards that "integrate cultural, biological, and mechanical practices that foster cycling of resources, promote ecological balance, and conserve biodiversity". USDA standards recognize four types of organic production:

- Crops: "Plants that are grown to be harvested as food, livestock feed, or fiber used to add nutrients to the field."
- Livestock: "Animals that can be used in the production of food, fiber, or feed."
- Processed/multi-ingredient products: "Items that have been handled and packaged (e.g. chopped carrots) or combined, processed, and packaged (e.g. bread or soup)."
- Wild crops: "Plants from a growing site that is not cultivated."

Organic agricultural operations should ultimately maintain or improve soil and water quality, and conserve wetlands, woodlands, and wildlife.

The Organic Foods Production Act of 1990 "requires the Secretary of Agriculture to establish a National List of Allowed and Prohibited Substances which identifies synthetic substances that may be used, and the non- synthetic substances that cannot be used, in organic production and handling operations."

The secretary of agriculture promulgated regulations establishing the National Organic Program (NOP). The final rule was published in the Federal Register in 2000.

USDA Organic certification confirms that the farm or handling facility (whether within the United States or internationally) complies with USDA organic regulations. Farms or handling facilities can be certified by private, foreign, or State entities, whose agents are accredited by the USDA (accredited agents are listed on the USDA website). Any farm or business that grosses more than $5,000 annually in organic sales must be certified. Farms and businesses that make less than $5,000 annually are "exempt", and must follow all the requirements as stated in the USDA regulations except for two requirements:

- Exempt operations do not need to be certified to "sell, label, or represent" their products as organic, but may not use the USDA organic seal or label their products as "certified organic". Exempt operations may pursue optional certification if they wish to use the USDA organic seal.
- Exempt operations are not required to have a system plan that documents the specific practices and substances used in the production or handling of their organic products

Exempt operations are also barred from selling their products as ingredients for use in another producer or handler's certified organic product, and may be required by buyers to sign an affidavit affirming adherence to USDA organic regulations.

Before an operation may sell, label or represent their products as "organic" (or use the USDA organic seal), it must undergo a 3-year transition period where any land used to produce raw organic commodities must be left untreated with prohibited substances.

Operations seeking certification must first submit an application for organic certification to a USDA-accredited certifying agent including the following:

- A detailed description of the operation seeking certification
- A history of substances used on the land over the prior 3 years
- A list of the organic products grown, raised, or processed
- A written "Organic System Plan (OSP)" which outlines the practices and substances intended for use during future organic production.
- Processors/handlers who are not primarily a farm (and farms with livestock and/or crops that also process products) must complete an Organic Handling Plan (OHP), and also include a product profile and label for each product

Certifying agents then review the application to confirm that the operation's practices follow USDA regulations, and schedule an inspection to verify adherence to the OSP, maintenance of records, and overall regulatory compliance

Inspection: During the site visit, the inspector observes onsite practices and compares them to the OSP, looks for any potential contamination by prohibited materials (or any risk of potential contamination), and takes soil, tissue, or product samples as needed. At farming operations, the inspector will also examine the fields, water systems, storage areas, and equipment, assess pest and weed management, check feed production, purchase records, livestock and their living conditions, and records of animal health management practices. For processing and handling facilities, the inspector evaluates the receiving, processing, and storage areas for organic ingredients and finished products, as well as assessing any potential hazards or contamination points (from "sanitation systems, pest management materials, or nonorganic processing aids"). If the facility also processes or handles nonorganic materials, the inspector will also analyze the measures in place to prevent commingling.

If the written application and operational inspection are successful, the certifying agent will issue an organic certificate to the applicant. The producer or handler must then submit an updated application and OSP, pay recertification fees to the agent, and undergo annual onsite inspections to receive recertification annually. Once certified, producers and handlers can have up to 75% of their organic certification costs reimbursed through the USDA Organic Certification Cost-Share Programs.

Federal legislation defines three levels of organic foods. Products made entirely with certified organic ingredients, methods, and processing aids can be labeled "100% organic" (including raw agricultural commodities that have been certified), while only products with at least 95% organic ingredients may be labeled "organic" (any non-organic ingredients used must fall under the exemptions of the National List). Under these two categories, no nonorganic agricultural ingredients are allowed when organic ingredients are available. Both of these categories may also display the "USDA Organic" seal, and must state the name of the certifying agent on the information panel.

A third category, containing a minimum of 70% organic ingredients, can be labeled "made with organic ingredients", but may not display the USDA Organic seal. Any remaining agricultural ingredients must be produced without excluded methods, including genetic modification, irradiation, or the application of synthetic fertilizers, sewage sludge, or biosolids. Non-agricultural ingredients used must be allowed on the National List. Organic ingredients must be marked in the ingredients list (e.g., "organic dill" or with an asterisk denoting organic status). In addition, products may also display the logo of the certification body that approved them.

Products made with less than 70% organic ingredients can not be advertised as "organic", but can list individual ingredients that are organic as such in the product's ingredient statement. Also, USDA ingredients from plants cannot be genetically modified.

Livestock feed is only eligible for labeling as "100% Organic" or "Organic".

Alcoholic products are also subject to the Alcohol and Tobacco Tax and Trade Bureau regulations. Any use of added sulfites in wine made with organic grapes means that the product is only eligible for the "made with" labeling category and therefore may not use the USDA organic seal. Wine labeled as made with other organic fruit cannot have sulfites added to it.

Organic textiles made be labeled organic and use the USDA organic seal if the finished product is certified organic and produced in full compliance with USDA organic regulations. If all of a specific fiber used in a product is certified organic, the label may state the percentage of organic fibers and identify the organic material.

Organic certification mandates that the certifying inspector must be able to complete both "trace-back" and "mass balance audits" for all ingredients and products. A trace-back audit confirms the existence of a record trail from time of purchase/production through the final sale. A mass balance audit verifies that enough organic product and ingredients have been produced or purchased to match the amount of product sold. Each ingredient and product must have an assigned lot number to ensure the existence of a proper audit trail.

Some of the earliest organizations to carry out organic certification in North America were the California Certified Organic Farmers, founded in 1973, and the voluntary standards and certification program popularized by the Rodale Press in 1972. Some retailers have their stores certified as organic handlers and processors to ensure organic compliance is maintained throughout the supply chain until delivered to consumers, such as Vitamin Cottage Natural Grocers, a 60-year-old chain based in Colorado.

Violations of USDA Organic regulations carry fines up to $11,000 per violation, and can also lead to suspension or revocation of a farm or business's organic certificate.

Once certified, USDA organic products can be exported to countries currently engaged in organic trade agreements with the U.S., including Canada, the European Union, Japan, and Taiwan, and do not require additional certification as long as the terms of the agreement are met.

==== Canada ====
In Canada, certification was implemented at the federal level on June 30, 2009. Mandatory certification is required for agricultural products represented as organic in import, export and inter-provincial trade, or that bear the federal organic logo. In Quebec, provincial legislation provides government oversight of organic certification within the province, through the Quebec Accreditation Board (Conseil D'Accréditation Du Québec). Only products that use at least 95% organic materials in production are allowed to bear the Canadian organic logo. Products between 70–95% may declare they have xx% of organic ingredients, however they do not meet requirements to bear the certified logo. Transitioning from a conventional agricultural operation to an organic operation takes the producers up to three years to receive organic certification, during which time products cannot be marketed as organic products, and producers will not receive pricing premiums on their goods during this time. Cows, sheep, and goats are the only livestock that are allowed to be transitioned to organic, under Canada's regulations. They must undergo organic management for one year before their products can be considered certified organic.

=== South America ===
==== Argentina ====
In Argentina, the Organic certification was implemented in December 2012, through a Ministry of Agriculture resolution. Organic products are labeled with the Orgánico Argentina seal, which is administered by SENASA and issued by four private companies. Organic production is regulated by the 25.127 Act, passed in 1999.

During 2019, 70,446 hectares (174,080 acres) of land were used for organic production certified with the Argentine seal.

=== Europe ===
==== Public organic certification ====
EU countries acquired comprehensive organic legislation with the implementation of the EU-Eco-regulation 1992. Supervision of certification bodies is handled on the national level. In March 2002 the European Commission issued an EU-wide label for organic food. It has been mandatory throughout the EU since July 2010. and has become compulsory after a two-year transition period.

The farmland converted to produce certified organic food has seen a significant evolution in the EU15 countries, rising from 1.8% in 1998 to 4.1% in 2005. For the current EU25 countries however the statistics report an overall percentage of just 1.5% as of 2005. However, the statistics showed a larger turnover of organic food in some countries, reaching 10% in France and 14% in Germany. In France 21% of available vegetables, fruits, milk and eggs were certified as organic. Numbers for 2010 show that 5.4% of German farmland has been converted to produce certified organic food, as has 10.4% of Swiss farmland and 11.7% of Austrian farmland. Non-EU countries have widely adopted the European certification regulations for organic food, to increase export to EU countries.

In 2009 a new logo was chosen through a design competition and online public vote. The new logo is a green rectangle that shows twelve stars (from the European flag) placed such that they form the shape of a leaf in the wind. Unlike earlier labels no words are presented on the label lifting the requirement for translations referring to organic food certification.

The new EU organic label has been implemented since July 2010 and has replaced the old European Organic label. However, producers that have had already printed and ready to use packaging with the old label were allowed to use them in the upcoming two years.

The development of the EU organic label was develop based on Denmark's organic food policy and the rules behind the Danish organic food label which at the moment holds the highest rate of recognition among its users in the world respectively 98% and 90% trust the label. The current EU organic label is meant to signal to the consumer that at least 95% of the ingredients used in the processed organic food is from organic origin and 5% considered an acceptable error margin.

European Organic Farmland in 2005

European Organic Farmland in 2005
Country	Area (ha)	Percent (%)
Austria	360,369	11
Belgium	22,994	1.7
Cyprus	2	1.1
Czech Republic	254,982	7.2
Denmark	134,129	5.2
Finland	147,587	6.5
France	560,838	2
Germany	807,406	4.7
Greece	288,737	7.2
Hungary	128,576	2
Ireland	34,912	0.8
Italy	1,069,462	8.4
Latvia	118,612	7
Lithuania	64,544	2.3
Luxembourg	3,158 *	2.4
Malta	14	0.1
Netherlands	48,765	2.5
Poland	82,730 *	2.4
Portugal	233,458	6.3
Slovakia	90,206	4.8
Slovenia	23,499	4.8
Spain	807,569	3.2
Sweden	222,268	6.2
Switzerland		11
United Kingdom	608,952	3.8
EU Total	6,115,465	3.9
Source: "Eurostat press release 80/2007"

==== Private organic certification ====
Besides the public organic certification regulation EU-Eco-regulation in 1992, there are various private organic certifications available:

- Demeter International is the largest certification organization for biodynamic agriculture, and is one of three predominant organic certifiers. Demeter Biodynamic Certification is used in over 50 countries to verify that biodynamic products meet international standards in production and processing. The Demeter certification program was established in 1928, and as such was the first ecological label for organically produced foods.
- Bio Suisse established in 1981 is the Swiss organic farmer umbrella organization. International activities are mainly focused on imports towards Switzerland and do not support export activities.
- Global Organic Textile Standard (GOTS) is a private standard for organic clothing for the entire post-harvest processing (including spinning, knitting, weaving, dyeing and manufacturing) of apparel and home textiles made with organic fibres (such as organic cotton, organic wool etc.). It includes both environmental and social criteria. Established in 2002, the standard is used in over 68 countries and is endorsed by USDA and IFOAM - Organics International. The material must be at least 95% organic, as certified by "recognized international or national standards". If the material is 70% organic, it can be labeled as "made with organic".

==== Czech Republic ====
Following private bodies certify organic produce: KEZ, o. p. s. (CZ-BIO-001), ABCert, AG (CZ-BIO-002) and BIOCONT CZ, s. r. o. (CZ-BIO-003). These bodies provide controlling of processes tied with issueing of certificate of origin. Controlling of compliancy (to (ES) no 882/2004 directive) is provided by government body ÚKZÚZ (Central Institute for Supervising and Testing in Agriculture).

==== France ====
In France, organic certification was introduced in 1985. It has established a green-white logo of "AB - agriculture biologique". The certification for the AB label fulfills the EU regulations for organic food. The certification process is overseen by a public institute ("Agence française pour le développement et la promotion de l'agriculture biologique" usually shortened to "Agence bio") established in November 2001. The actual certification authorities include a number of different institutes like Aclave, Agrocert, COSMEBIO, Ecocert SA, Qualité France SA, Ulase, SGS ICS.

==== Germany ====
In Germany the national label was introduced in September 2001 following in the footsteps of the political campaign of "Agrarwende" (agricultural major shift) led by minister Renate Künast of the Greens party. This campaign was started after the outbreak of mad cow disease in 2000. The effects on farming are still challenged by other political parties. The national "Bio"-label in its hexagon green-black-white shape has gained wide popularity—in 2007 there were 2431 companies having certified 41,708 products. The popularity of the label is extending to neighbouring countries like Austria, Switzerland and France.

In the German-speaking countries there have been older non-government organizations that had issued labels for organic food long before the advent of the EU organic food regulations. Their labels are still used widely as they significantly exceed the requirements of the EU regulations. An organic food label like "demeter" from Demeter International has been in use since 1928 and this label is still regarded as providing the highest standards for organic food in the world. Other active NGOs include Bioland (1971), Biokreis (1979), Biopark (1991), Ecoland (1997), Ecovin (1985), Gäa e.V. (1989), Naturland (1981) and Bio Suisse (1981).

==== Greece ====
In Greece, there are 13 certification and inspection bodies approved by the EU. Most of the certifications are obtained from DIO (Greek: ΔΗΩ) and BIOHELLAS.

==== Ireland ====
In Ireland, organic certification is available from the Irish Organic Farmers and Growers Association, Demeter Standards Ltd. and Organic Trust Ltd.

==== Switzerland ====
In Switzerland, products sold as organic must comply at a minimum with the Swiss organic regulation (Regulation 910.18). Higher standards are required before a product can be labelled with the Bio Suisse label.

==== Sweden ====
In Sweden, organic certification is handled by the organisation KRAV with members such as farmers, processors, trade and also consumer, environmental and animal welfare interests.

==== Ukraine ====
In Ukraine, organic is regulated in accordance with the Law of Ukraine On Basic Principles and Requirements for Organic Production, Circulation and Labelling of Organic Products. Majority of Ukrainian producers, processing units, traders are also certified under international organic legislation (e.g. EU Organic Regulations, NOP, etc. The Order on the Approval of the State Logo for Organic Products was approved by the Ministry of Agrarian Policy and Food of Ukraine in 2019. The state logo for organic products is registered as a trademark and owned by the Ministry of Agrarian Policy and Food of Ukraine. The requirements for proper use of the Ukrainian state logo for organic products and labelling are described on the website of the Ministry of Agrarian Policy and Food of Ukraine as well as in the Methodical Recommendations on the Use of the State Logo for Organic Products.

In the summer 2023, the State Register of Operators the Produce Organic Products in Compliance with the Legislation in Organic Production, Circulation and Labelling of Organic Products and the State Register of Certification Bodies in Organic Production and Circulation of Organic Products that are maintained by the Ministry of Agrarian Policy and Food of Ukraine were launched in Ukraine.

A certificate confirming production and/or circulation of organic products under the legislation other than Ukrainian, shall be recognised in Ukraine with the view to import or export of such products, provided that it has been issued by the foreign certification body included in the List of foreign certification bodies which is maintained by the State Service of Ukraine on Food Safety and Consumer Protection.

State Institution "Entrepreneurship and Export Promotion Office" (EEPO, Ukraine) plays an important role in Ukrainian organic export facilitation.

Milestones and all the other useful information about the Ukrainian organic sector is available at the specialised Ukrainian organic webportal OrganicInfo.ua.

==== United Kingdom ====
In the United Kingdom, organic certification is handled by a number of organizations, regulated by The Department for Environment, Food and Rural Affairs (DEFRA), of which the largest are the Soil Association and Organic Farmers and Growers. While UK certification bodies are required to meet the EU minimum organic standards for all member states; they may choose to certify to standards that exceed the minimums, as is the case with the Soil Association.

=== Asia and Oceania ===
==== Australia ====
In Australia, organic certification is performed by several organisations that are accredited by the Biosecurity section of the Department of Agriculture (Australia), formerly the Australian Quarantine and Inspection Service, under the National Standard for Organic and Biodynamic Produce. All claims about the organic status of products sold in Australia are covered under the Competition and Consumer Act 2010.

In Australia, the Organic Federation of Australia is the peak body for the organic industry in Australia and is part of the government's Organic Consultative Committee Legislative Working Group that sets organic standards.

Department of Agriculture accreditation is a legal requirement for all organic products exported from Australia. Export Control (Organic Produce Certification) Orders are used by the Department to assess organic certifying bodies and recognise them as approved certifying organisations. Approved certifying organisations are assessed by the Department for both initial recognition and on an at least annual basis thereafter to verify compliance.

In the absence of domestic regulation, DOA accreditation also serves as a 'de facto' benchmark for certified product sold on the domestic market. Despite its size and growing share of the economy "the organic industry in Australia remains largely self-governed. There is no specific legislation for domestic organic food standardisation and labelling at the state or federal level as there is in the USA and the EU".

===== Australian approved certifying organisations =====
The Department has several approved certifying organisations that manage the certification process of organic and bio-dynamic operators in Australia. These certifying organisations perform a number of functions on the Department's behalf:

- Assess organic and bio-dynamic operators to determine compliance to the National Standard for Organic and Bio-Dynamic Produce and importing country requirements.
- Issue a Quality Management Certificate (QM Certificate) to organic operators to recognise compliance to export requirements.
- Issue Organic Produce Certificates (Export Documentation) for consignments of organic and bio-dynamic produce being exported.

As of 2015, there are seven approved certifying organisations:

- AUS-QUAL Pty Ltd (AUSQUAL)
- Australian Certified Organic (ACO)
- Bio-Dynamic Research Institute (BDRI)
- NASAA Certified Organic (NCO)
- Organic Food Chain (OFC)
- Safe Food Production Queensland (SFQ)
- Tasmanian Organic-dynamic Producers (TOP)

There are 2567 certified organic businesses reported in Australia in 2014. They include 1707 primary producers, 719 processors and manufacturers, 141 wholesalers and retailers plus other operators.

Australia does not have a national logo or seal to identify which products are certified organic, instead the logos of the individual certifying organisations are used.

==== China ====
In China, the organic certification is administered by a government agency named Certification and Accreditation Administration of the People's Republic of China (CNCA). While the implementation of certification works, including site checking, lab test on soil, water, product qualities are performed by the China Quality Certification Center (CQC) which is an agency of Administration of Quality Supervision, Inspection and Quarantine (AQSIQ).The organic certification procedures in china are performed according to China Organic Standard GB/T 19630.1-4—2011 which was issued in year 2011. This standard has governed standard procedure for Organic certification process performed by CQC, including application, inspection, lab test procedures, certification decision and post certification administration. The certificate issued by CQC are valid for one year.

There are two logos that are currently used by the CQC for labeling products with Organic Certification, these are the Organic Logo and CQC Logo.

==== India ====
In India, APEDA regulates the certification of organic products as per National Standards for Organic Production. "The NPOP standards for production and accreditation system have been recognized by European Commission and Switzerland as equivalent to their country standards." Organic food products manufactured and exported from India are marked with the India Organic certification mark issued by the APEDA. APEDA has recognized 11 inspection certification bodies, some of which are branches of foreign certification bodies, others are local certification bodies.

==== Japan ====
In Japan, the Japanese Agricultural Standard (JAS) was fully implemented as law in April 2001. This was revised in November 2005 and all JAS certifiers were required to be re-accredited by the Ministry of Agriculture.

==== Singapore ====
As of 2014 the Agri-Food & Veterinary Authority of Singapore had no organic certification process, but instead relied on international certification bodies; it does not track local producers who claim to have gotten organic certification.

==== Cambodia ====
In Cambodia, Cambodian Organic Agriculture Association (COrAA) is the only organization that is authorized to give certificate for organic agricultural products. It is a nationwide private organization working for the promotion of organic and sustainable agriculture in Cambodia. COrAA has developed both organic and chemical-free agricultural standards and provides third-party-certification to producers following these standards. In addition, the services that COrAA provides include technical training for the conversion from chemical/conventional to organic farming, marketing support, organic awareness building among the general public, and a platform for dialogue and cooperation among organic stakeholders in Cambodia.

=== Africa ===
==== Kenya ====
In Kenya, the Kenya Organic Agriculture Network (KOAN) is mandated to coordinate the Organic Sector. It is the national Coordinator and Issuer of the certificate under Participatory Guarantee System (PGS). KOAN is also the custodian of the Kilimohai Organic Mark of Organic Certification under the East Africa Organic Products Standards.

== Issues ==
Organic certification is not without its critics. Some of the staunchest opponents of chemical-based farming and factory farming practices also oppose formal certification. They see it as a way to drive independent organic farmers out of business, and to undermine the quality of organic food. Other organizations such as the Organic Trade Association work within the organic community to foster awareness of legislative and other related issues, and enable the influence and participation of organic proponents.

=== False assurance of quality and environmental benefit ===
The label itself can be used to mislead many customers that food labelled as being organic is safer, healthier and more nutritious. Thus, a product may be labelled organic, but have no significant nutritional value compared to other products.

According to medical researcher Henry I Miller, the organic label is primarily a marketing tool rather than an indicator of food safety, nutritional value, or product quality. He describes it as a cynical designation, arguing that many consumers pay high prices for organic products without tangible benefit. Miller also contends that claims about organic farming’s sustainability are contradicted by evidence showing that its systematically lower yields would require more land and water if widely adopted, thereby worsening environmental pressures.

=== Obstacles to small independent producers ===
Originally, in the 1960s through the 1980s, the organic food industry was composed of mainly small, independent farmers, selling locally. Organic "certification" was a matter of trust, based on a direct relationship between farmer and consumer. Critics view regulatory certification as a potential barrier to entry for small producers, by burdening them with increased costs, paperwork, and bureaucracy.

In China, due to government regulations, international companies wishing to market organic produce must be independently certified. It is reported that "Australian food producers are spending up to $50,000 to be certified organic by Chinese authorities to crack the burgeoning middle-class market of the Asian superpower." Whilst the certification process is described by producers as "extremely difficult and very expensive", a number of organic producers have acknowledged the ultimately positive effect of gaining access to the emerging Chinese market. For example, figures from Australian organic infant formula and baby food producer Bellamy's Organic indicate export growth, to China alone, of 70 per cent per year since gaining Chinese certification in 2008, while similar producers have shown export growth of 20 per cent to 30 per cent a year following certification

Peak Australian organic certification body, Australian Certified Organic, has stated however that "many companies have baulked at risking the money because of the complex, unwieldy and expensive process to earn Chinese certification." By comparison, equivalent certification costs in Australia are less than $2,000 (AUD), with costs in the United States as low as $750 (USD) for a similarly sized business.

=== Manipulative use of regulations ===
Manipulation of certification regulations as a way to mislead or outright dupe the public is a very real concern. Some examples are creating exceptions (allowing non-organic inputs to be used without loss of certification status) and creative interpretation of standards to meet the letter, but not the intention, of particular rules. For example, a complaint filed with the USDA in February 2004 against Bayliss Ranch, a food ingredient producer and its certifying agent, charged that tap water had been certified organic, and advertised for use in a variety of water-based body care and food products, in order to label them "organic" under US law. Steam-distilled plant extracts, consisting mainly of tap water introduced during the distilling process, were certified organic, and promoted as an organic base that could then be used in a claim of organic content. The case was dismissed by the USDA, as the products had been actually used only in personal care products, over which the department at the time extended no labeling control. The company subsequently adjusted its marketing by removing reference to use of the extracts in food products.

In 2013, the Australian Competition & Consumer Commission said that water can no longer be labelled as organic water because, based on organic standards, water cannot be organic and it is misleading and deceptive to label any water as such.

=== Erosion of standards ===
Critics of formal certification also fear an erosion of organic standards. Provided with a legal framework within which to operate, lobbyists can push for amendments and exceptions favorable to large-scale production, resulting in "legally organic" products produced in ways similar to current conventional food. Combined with the fact that organic products are now sold predominantly through high volume distribution channels such as supermarkets, the concern is that the market is evolving to favor the biggest producers, and this could result in the small organic farmer being squeezed out.

In the United States, large food companies have "assumed a powerful role in setting the standards for organic foods". Many members of standard-setting boards come from large food corporations. As more corporate members have joined, many nonorganic substances have been added to the National List of acceptable ingredients. The United States Congress has also played a role in allowing exceptions to organic food standards. In December 2005, the 2006 agricultural appropriations bill was passed with a rider allowing 38 synthetic ingredients to be used in organic foods, including food colorings, starches, sausage and hot-dog casings, hops, fish oil, chipotle chili pepper, and gelatin; this allowed Anheuser-Busch in 2007 to have its Wild Hop Lager certified organic "even though [it] uses hops grown with chemical fertilizers and sprayed with pesticides."

== See also ==
- Biopesticide
- Certified Naturally Grown
- Farm assurance
- Herbicide
- List of countries with organic agriculture regulation
- List of organic food topics
- NSF International
- Organic clothing
- Organic cotton
- Organic farming
- Organic food culture
- Standards of identity for food
