= Bio Suisse =

Association of the Swiss Organic Agriculture Organisations (Bio Suisse)
- (in German) Vereinigung der Schweizer Biolandbau-Organisationen (in French) Association suisse des organisations d’agriculture biologique (in Italian) Associazione svizzera delle organizzazioni per l’agricoltura biologica (in Romansh) Uniun svizra da las organisaziuns d’agricultura biologica
- Formation: 1981; 45 years ago
- Headquarters: Basel
- Subsidiaries: 33 associations of organic farmers and the Research Institute of Organic Agriculture
- Affiliations: International Federation of Organic Agriculture Movements
- Website: www.bio-suisse.ch

Bio Suisse is the main organisation of organic agriculture in Switzerland. This umbrella organization counts 33 organic farmers' associations among its members, as well as the Research Institute of Organic Agriculture FiBL. It notably manages the guidelines of the organic label "Bio Suisse".

It was founded in 1981 and, as federation of the Swiss organic farmers, represents the interest of about 7,560 agricultural businesses (regularly inspected by independent bodies).Organic market share continues to grow (in German) It also certifies around 1300 processing companies.

The organic label "Bio Suisse" is widely distributed in Switzerland, for instance through organic food shops, farmers markets and the largest supermarkets chains: Coop Naturaplan and Migros Bio.

As of 2022, 17,4 percent of Swiss farms are organic and the organic market in Switzerland share to almost 11 percent.

Imports will be permitted only if domestic production is not possible (e.g. coffee), not sufficient (e.g. cereals) from Swiss Bud farmers or has already been sold. The products are processed mainly in Switzerland.

Fresh products from overseas are only permitted in exceptional cases (e.g. mangoes or bananas). Vegetables are sourced in Europe and/or from Mediterranean countries, even in winter. Imports by air are prohibited. Nearby foreign countries are preferred for imports.

In 2021, over 2’500 farms/producer groups abroad were certified to Bio Suisse regulations. Most of them are located in Europe. Cereals and animal feed are the products most commonly imported in terms of volume.

In 2023, Bio Suisse introduced the "Bio Cuisine" label. Bio Cuisine stands for more sustainability in gastronomy. "Bio Cuisine" identifies restaurants and businesses with a relevant proportion of Bud products.

== Guidelines and Certification ==
The Bio Suisse guidelines are based on the Organic Farming Ordinance, but go beyond it in many respects, such as plant protection, animal feed, processing and social standards. The "Bud", the Bio Suisse organic label stands for:

- Holistic - organic for the whole farm and for the whole product processing
- Biodiversity - diverse habitats for plants and animals
- Animal welfare - species-appropriate fodder, animal-friendly stable, plenty of exercise and pasture (tethered stables are permitted) if the animals can move regularly outdoors.
- Resource conservation - renunciation of chemical-synthetic pesticides and artificial fertilizers. Protection of soil, water, air and climate.
- Taste - gentle processing, free of aroma and colourings, authentic product
- Confidence - strict controls, renunciation of genetic engineering, strict regulations for imports
- Fairness - Guidelines for social requirements and fair trade

The operations in Switzerland are inspected by the state-approved organic inspection bodies Bio.inspecta, Bio-Test Agro, Pro Cert or IMO.

Companies of foreign suppliers are inspected at the request of a licensee if he does not find the products in Switzerland or does not find them in sufficient quantity. These companies must comply with the Bio Suisse Organic guidelines, which are equivalent to the Bio Suisse guidelines for Switzerland; supplemented by some requirements such as sustainable water use in areas with scarce water resources. The annual inspections of the farms are carried out by accredited inspection bodies on site. On the basis of these inspection reports, the International Certification Bio Suisse (ICB AG) and bio.inspecta assess the conformity of the processes and practices of the farms with the requirements of Bio Suisse and issue a Bio Suisse Organic Certificate if fulfilled. This is the most important prerequisite for importing organic products into Switzerland for sale with the "Bud" label.

== Requirements for import ==
The Bio Suisse Standards differ from minimum governmental regulations in several important respects, e. g. those of the EU (see the information note Summary of the Bio Suisse Standards for producers outside of Switzerland).

Especially noteworthy are: The whole-farm approach, the establishment of areas dedicated to the enhancement of biodiversity, and rigorous limits on the intensity of fertilization and on the use of copper. As an importer of organic products to be marketed with the "Bud" a Swiss importer must hold a valid licence contract with Bio Suisse and the import licence for the corresponding products. Also the suppliers must be certified according to Bio Suisse Standards (throughout all levels of trade from cultivation to export). Furthermore, the provisions of the Swiss Ordinance on Organic Farming SR 910.18 must be complied with in any case. These requirements are listed in detail in the Import manual, the guide for the import of organic products to be marketed with the "Bud".

== See also ==
- Agriculture in Switzerland
- Environmental movement in Switzerland
- EU-Eco-regulation
- International Federation of Organic Agriculture Movements (member)
- Organic aquaculture
- Research Institute of Organic Agriculture
