= Ecovia Intelligence =

British consulting company

- Formerly: Organic Monitor
- Company type: Private
- Industry: Market research
- Founded: 2001; 25 years ago
- Headquarters: London, United Kingdom
- Key people: Amarjit Sahota (director)
- Website: ecoviaint.com

Ecovia Intelligence (formerly Organic Monitor) is a specialist research, consulting & training company that focuses on the global organic & related product industries. Ecovia Intelligence was founded in 2001 with headquarters in London, the organization has researchers and representatives in various international locations.

== History ==
Ecovia Intelligence was founded as Organic Monitor by Amarjit Sahota in 2001. In subsequent years, the company's business services and industry sectors broadened. Its specialist industries now span natural ingredients, dairy alternatives & free-from foods, natural cosmetics, fair trade products, ethical textiles, sustainable packaging, green cleaning products, etc.

Ecovia Intelligence launched a series of sustainability summits in 2009. It now hosts the Sustainable Cosmetics Summit, Sustainable Foods Summit and Sustainable Cleaning Products Summit in the major geographic regions of the world.

In 2013, Ecovia Intelligence launched the Sustainable Beauty Awards, giving recognition to cosmetic and related firms who are pushing the boundaries of sustainability in the beauty industry.

In Spring 2017, Organic Monitor re-branded to Ecovia Intelligence.
