= PGS =

PGS can stand for:

== Companies ==
- Petroleum Geo-Services, an oilfield service company
- PGS Entertainment
- Plant Genetic Systems, a biotech company located in Belgium

== General ==
- Parallel giant slalom, a discipline in alpine skiing and snowboarding
- Participatory Guarantee Systems, for quality assurance
- Physicians for Global Survival, a Canadian NGO
- Pre-implantation genetic screening
- Prompt Global Strike, a proposed class of US weapons systems
- Pittsburgh Geological Society
- Protected Geographical Status, EU protection of regional food names
- Alliance of Primorje-Gorski Kotar (Croatian: Primorsko goranski savez), a Croatian political party
- Polygenic score, estimated effect of genetic variants
- Presentation Graphic Stream, a subtitle format used on Blu-ray discs

== Schools ==
- Pate's Grammar School, England
- Parkstone Grammar School, England
- Penistone Grammar School, England
- Poole Grammar School, England
- Portsmouth Grammar School, England

== Other uses ==
- Presentation Graphic Stream
