= Plazuela Zaragoza, Mazatlán =

Park in Mazatlán

Plazuela Zaragoza
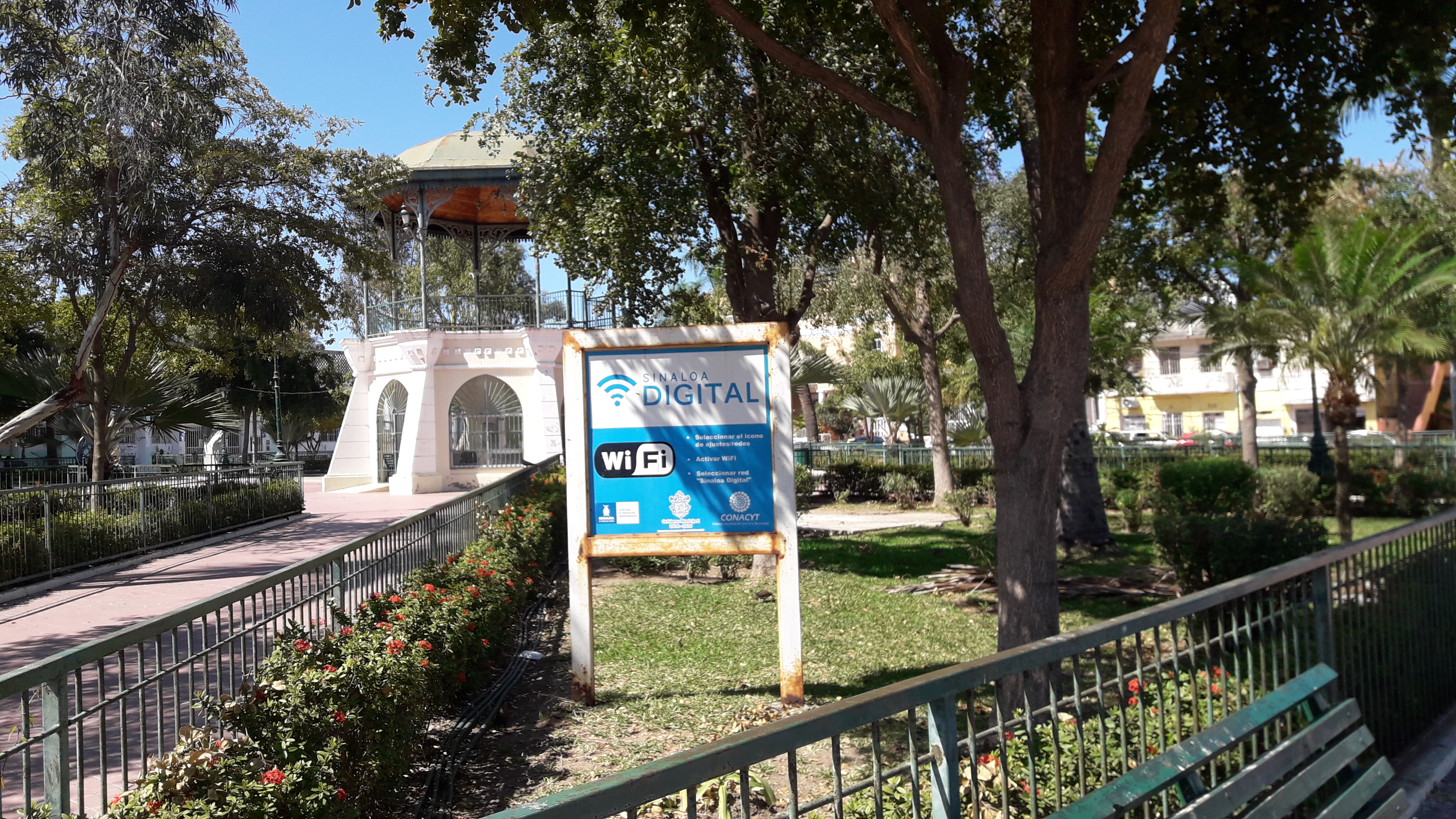
- Plazuela Zaragoza in 2022
- Interactive map of Plazuela Zaragoza
- Type: Public park
- Location: Mazatlán, Mexico
- Coordinates: 23.20437869794928°N 106.42319947365013°W
- Open: Year-round
- Status: Existing
- Website: tics.mazatlan.gob.mx/tourist/es/sitios-interes/detalle/49

The Plazuela Zaragoza is a town square and public park in Mazatlán. It is located between the streets Avenida Ignacio Zaragoza, Calle Morelos, Calle Guillermo Nelson and Calle 5 de Mayo.

== History ==
Before 1862, the place was known as Plazuela del Puerto Viejo and was used for military drills by soldiers from nearby Cuartel Colorado (Red Fort). In October 1862 it was given its current name, in honour of Ignacio Zaragoza. In 1940 the gazebo was built, and in 2013 the square was renovated. It has since suffered from vandalism and the looting of the gazebo's upper ornaments.

== Events ==
- Every Thursday a danzón is held - a dance event that was canceled in 2020 due to COVID-19 but returned in 2022.
- On May 13, 2022 a tree in the park was declared a Sanctuary for all the missing persons. The rastreadoras organization of family members use the tree to place photographs of their missing relatives, asking for help in localizing them.
- Between 2012 and 2022, an organic market was regularly held where local farmers sold organic products.

== Gallery ==
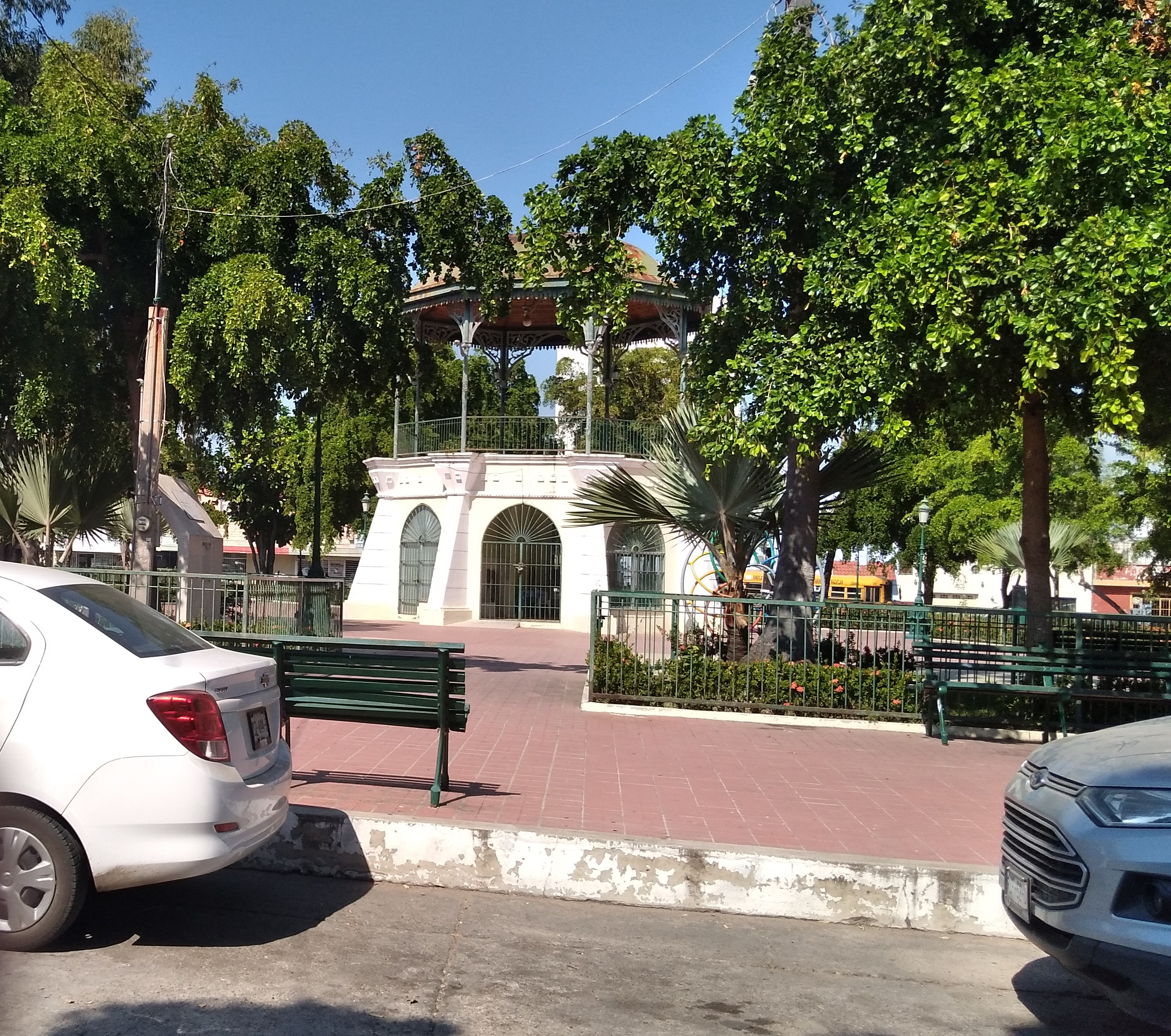
Plazuela Zaragoza in 2021

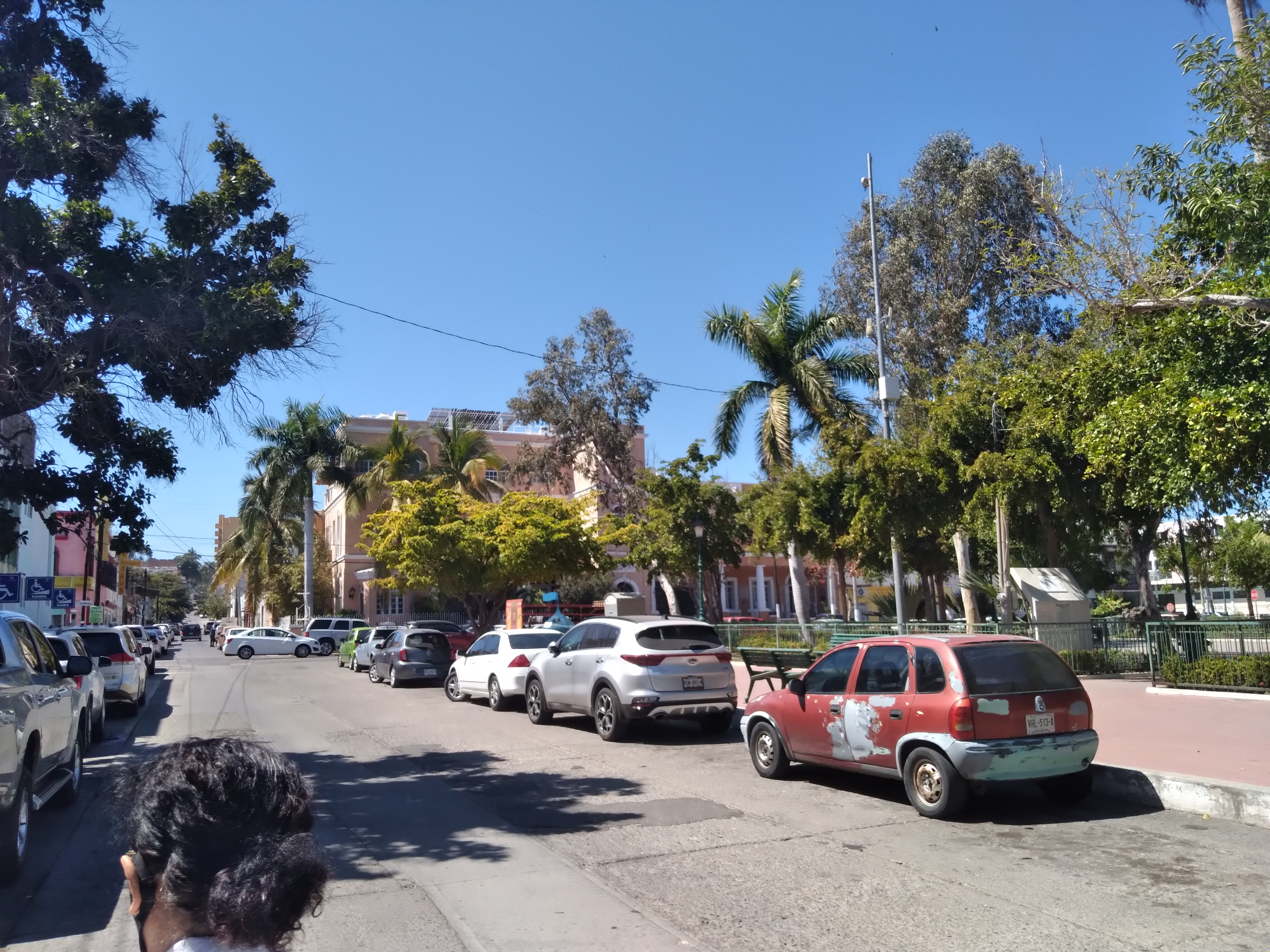
View of the park from Morelos street

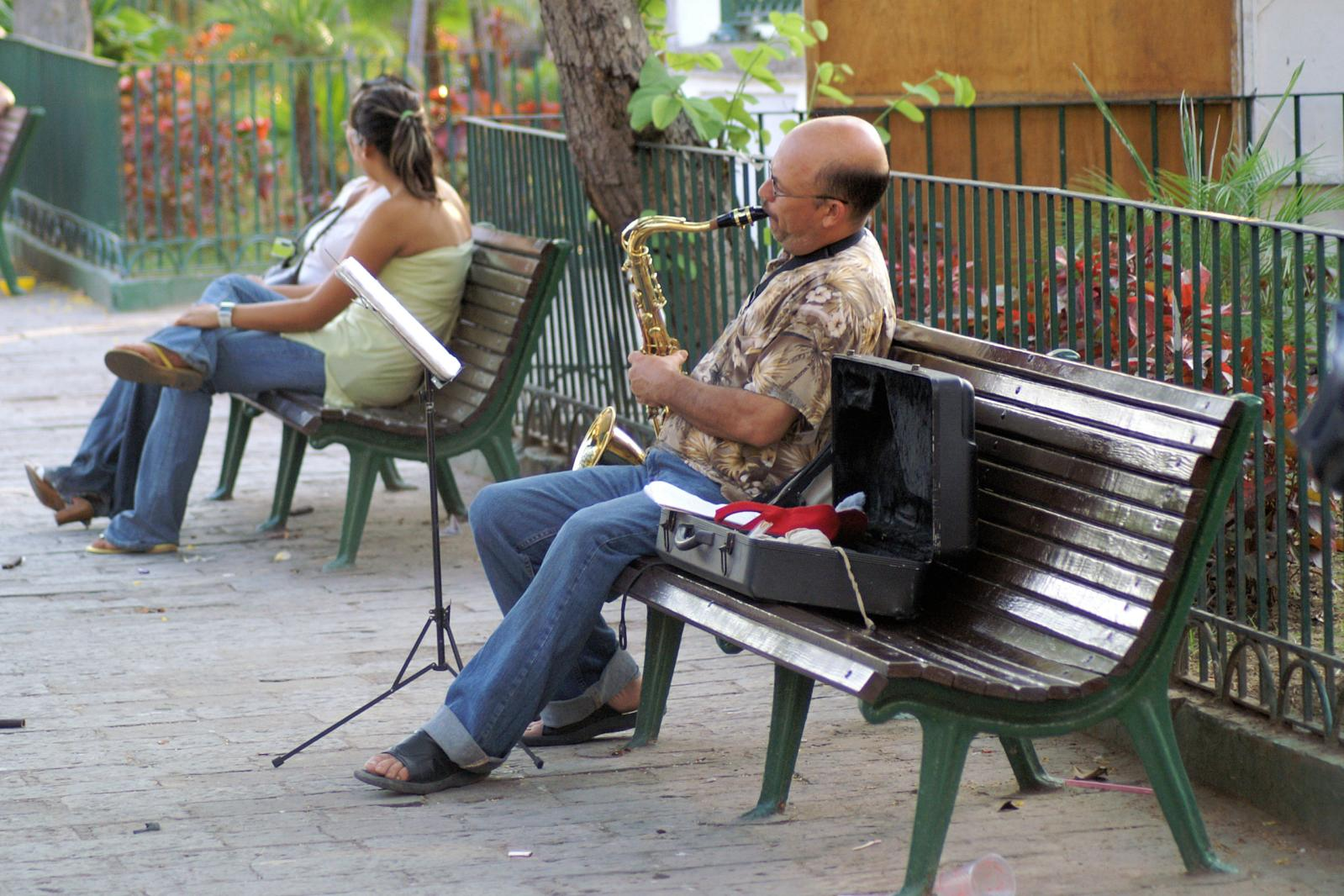
People in the park

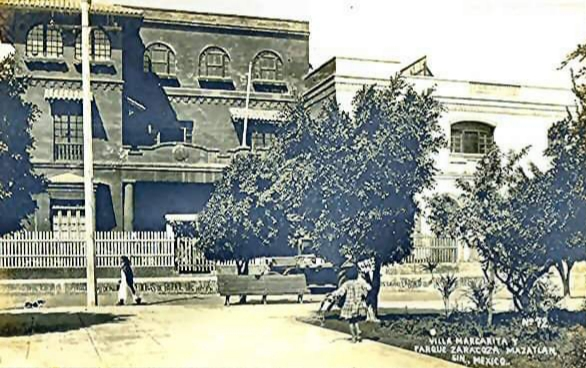
Plazuela Zaragoza on an unknown date

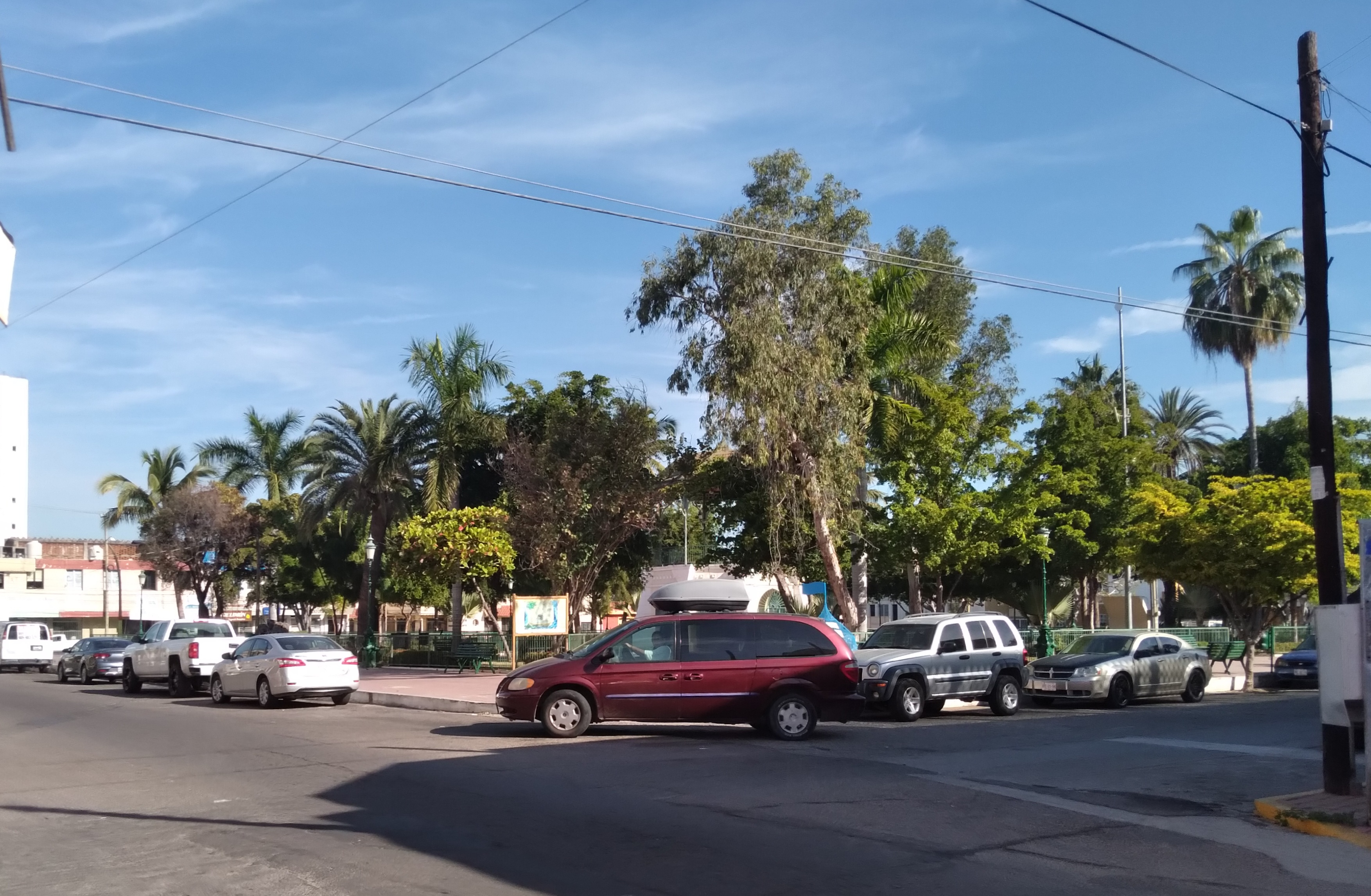
Plazuela Zaragoza in 2020

Plazuela Zaragoza in 2018

== See also ==
Media related to Plazuela Zaragoza, Mazatlán at Wikimedia Commons
