= Ekologiska Lantbrukarna =

Swedish agricultural organization

Ekologiska Lantbrukarna is a Swedish interest group and non-profit organization for farmers engaged in organic agriculture.

The organization was founded in 1985 as Alternativodlarnas Riksförbund (National Association of Alternative Growers); the initiators simultaneously established the KRAV organization. The current name was adopted in 1993. Ekologiska Lantbrukarna's work focuses on market development, agricultural policy, the development of regulations, and the strengthening of environmental, climate, and organic value-added aspects. The association has 19 active regional chapters that conduct local activities such as training sessions and field walks.

The association has eight elected national board members, and the organization's chairperson is farmer Erika Olsson, who runs Onsberga Farm near Tystberga. The organization maintains a secretariat with approximately four full-time employees and a number of consultants affiliated with its operations.

The organization publishes the magazine Ekologiskt lantbruk, which is released in about seven issues per year.
