= List of countries with organic agriculture regulation =

This list documents the status of formal government-standards, regulations, and certification of organic farming and organic food.

== List of countries with regulations on organic agriculture ==
Region	Country	Status	Source
European Union (27)	Austria	Fully implemented	
European Union (27)	Belgium	Fully implemented	
European Union (27)	Bulgaria	Fully implemented	
European Union (27)	Croatia	Fully implemented	
European Union (27)	Cyprus	Fully implemented	
European Union (27)	Czech Republic	Fully implemented	
European Union (27)	Denmark	Fully implemented	
European Union (27)	Estonia	Fully implemented	
European Union (27)	Finland	Fully implemented	
European Union (27)	France	Fully implemented	
European Union (27)	Germany	Fully implemented	
European Union (27)	Greece	Fully implemented	
European Union (27)	Hungary	Fully implemented	
European Union (27)	Ireland	Fully implemented	
European Union (27)	Italy	Fully implemented	
European Union (27)	Latvia	Fully implemented	
European Union (27)	Lithuania	Fully implemented	
European Union (27)	Luxembourg	Fully implemented	
European Union (27)	Malta	Fully implemented	
European Union (27)	Netherlands	Fully implemented	
European Union (27)	Poland	Fully implemented	
European Union (27)	Portugal	Fully implemented	
European Union (27)	Romania	Fully implemented	
European Union (27)	Slovakia	Fully implemented	
European Union (27)	Slovenia	Fully implemented	
European Union (27)	Spain	Fully implemented	
European Union (27)	Sweden	Fully implemented	
Others Europe (11)	Albania	Not fully implemented	
Others Europe (11)	Iceland	Fully implemented	
Others Europe (11)	Macedonia	Fully implemented	
Others Europe (11)	Moldova	Fully implemented	
Others Europe (11)	Montenegro	Fully implemented	
Others Europe (11)	Norway	Fully implemented	
Others Europe (11)	Serbia	Not fully implemented	
Others Europe (11)	Switzerland	Fully implemented	
Others Europe (11)	Turkey	Fully implemented	
Others Europe (11)	Ukraine	Fully implemented	
Others Europe (11)	United Kingdom	Fully implemented	
Asia and Pacific Region (12)	Australia	Only export regulations	
Asia and Pacific Region (12)	Bangladesh	Not fully implemented	
Asia and Pacific Region (12)	Bhutan	Not fully implemented	
Asia and Pacific Region (12)	China	Fully implemented	
Asia and Pacific Region (12)	India	Fully implemented	
Asia and Pacific Region (12)	Israel	Fully implemented	
Asia and Pacific Region (12)	Japan	Fully implemented	
Asia and Pacific Region (12)	New Zealand	Only export regulations	
Asia and Pacific Region (12)	Philippines	Not fully implemented	
Asia and Pacific Region (12)	South Korea	Fully implemented	
Asia and Pacific Region (12)	Taiwan	Fully implemented	
Asia and Pacific Region (12)	Thailand	Fully implemented	
Americas and Caribbean (14)	Argentina	Fully implemented	
Americas and Caribbean (14)	Bolivia	Not fully implemented	
Americas and Caribbean (14)	Brazil	Fully implemented	
Americas and Caribbean (14)	Canada	Fully implemented	
Americas and Caribbean (14)	Chile	Fully implemented	
Americas and Caribbean (14)	Costa Rica	National regulations not fully implemented	
Americas and Caribbean (14)	Dominican Republic	Not fully implemented	
Americas and Caribbean (14)	Ecuador	Fully implemented	
Americas and Caribbean (14)	El Salvador	Not fully implemented	
Americas and Caribbean (14)	Honduras	Fully implemented	
Americas and Caribbean (14)	Mexico	Fully implemented	
Americas and Caribbean (14)	Paraguay	Not fully implemented	
Americas and Caribbean (14)	Peru	Not fully implemented	
Americas and Caribbean (14)	United States	Fully implemented	
Africa (2)	Ghana	Not fully implemented	
Africa (2)	Tunisia	Fully implemented	

== Countries with regulations in development ==
Region	Country	Source
Europe	Bosnia and Herzegovina	
Europe	Russia	
Asia and Pacific Region	Armenia	
Asia and Pacific Region	Azerbaijan	
Asia and Pacific Region	Georgia	
Asia and Pacific Region	Hong Kong	
Asia and Pacific Region	Indonesia	
Asia and Pacific Region	Lebanon	
Asia and Pacific Region	Saudi Arabia	
Asia and Pacific Region	Vietnam	
Americas and Caribbean	Cuba	
Americas and Caribbean	Nicaragua	
Americas and Caribbean	Saint Lucia	
Africa	Cameroon	
Africa	Egypt	
Africa	Madagascar	
Africa	South Africa	
