= Organic product =

Products that are organic

An organic product is made from materials produced by organic agriculture. Most well known organic products are organic food items, however clothing and personal care items can also be made with organic agriculture.

Many countries have strict consumer safety regulations to protect consumers from consuming harmful products. These agencies often certify cultivated products as organic. The United States uses USDA certification through the National Organic Program to define products as organic. According to USDA, in order for a product to be considered organic, several standards must be met. The National List of Allowed and Prohibited Substances details synthetic and non-synthetic substances that can be used in the process of producing organic products. Operations involving these organic products must be "protecting natural resources, conserving biodiversity, and using only approved substances."

== Organic food products ==
Organic food products are grown under a system of agriculture without the use of harmful chemical fertilizers and pesticides with an environmentally and socially responsible approach. This is a method of farming that works at grass root level preserving the reproductive and regenerative capacity of the soil, good plant nutrition, and sound soil management, produces nutritious food rich in vitality which has resistance to diseases. In this method growing plants take time to grow naturally and always good for health. Most of the country has its own organic products cultivation regulation monitor organic products. USA use USDA certification, India uses India Organic certification NPOP (National Program for Organic Production).

There are many benefits involving organic food products. Organic foods contain fewer pesticides. This means that products such as insecticide that are used in most agricultural practices are eliminated. People are concerned with these chemicals that are used to preserve foods are then being consumed by the people who purchase them. Farming without pesticides is also better for the environment. Fewer chemicals are being placed on the ground, entering the soil and water supply. Organic meats can also contain a lot more nutrients. Nutrients like omega-3 fatty acids were up to 50 percent higher in organic meats and milk than in conventionally raised products.

One of the main reasons that deter people from organic products is costs. In 2015, on average, organic products were 47 percent more expensive. Organic products can vary a lot in price. According to a study performed by consumerreports.org, organic products compared to non-organic products ranged anywhere from 13 percent cheaper to 303 percent more expensive. The reason why organic products cost so much more on average is the production process. Many factors contribute to this cost. First, the demand for an organic product is larger than the number of organic products available. Without synthetic pesticides, quantities of foods will be smaller. This smaller production of organic food means an increased cost. Also, the amount of labour per unit of food is larger compared to the mass production of non-organic products.

== Organic clothing products ==
Clothing products made with such raw materials which have been produced by using organic methods are referred to as organic clothing. Organic cotton T-shirts are T-shirts which are made from organic cotton that has been grown using organic fertilizers and other supplements instead of inorganic insecticides and pesticides. By definition, organic clothing products are such products whose raw material have been produced using organic methods and the product has been produced using eco-friendly method including the machinery and equipment.

Popular clothing brands like Patagonia, are labelled as organic by using 100 percent organic cotton for many of their styles. Even big brands like Nike, Adidas, and Levi's are moving towards a more organic brand. These are 3 of 13 clothing companies that have committed to the 2025 Sustainable Cotton Challenge. Brands who participate in this challenge are committed to using 100 percent sustainable cotton by 2025.

== Organic personal care products ==
Unlike food products, the USDA does not regulate the term "organic" as it applies to personal care products. A personal care product can be deemed organic if it contains agricultural ingredients and can meet the USDA organic production standards. Once certified by the USDA it can fall into one of four categories: "100 percent organic", "organic", "made with organic ingredients", or "made with less than 70 percent organic ingredients." personal care product can only claim they are USDA-certified organic if they meet the qualifications of the USDA.

Consumers are concerned with exactly what they put in and on their bodies. Just like people are concerned with putting more organic foods in their bodies, they are also concerned about using more organic personal care products. Personal care products can fall under a wide variety of products such as deodorant, makeup, tampons, lotion, shampoo, etc. Chemicals in these personal care products can be associated with a wide variety of concerns including things like hormone disruption, allergies, and infertility. Companies are hearing the concerns of these chemicals from consumers and trying to diversify. Many big makeup companies such as Avon and Revlon are removing phthalates from their products. Johnson & Johnson removed many chemicals from their products including parabens, formaldehyde, and certain fragrance chemicals. Cosmetic brands such as Laurel and Rose Mira are both 100 percent organic and have a wide array of skin care products.

Similar to organic food, organic personal care products also have a higher price tag. While organic personal care products may lack many of the harmful chemicals that consumers like to stay clear of, this cleaner alternative comes with the cost of a higher price.
