= Organic Food Development Center =

The Organic Food Development Center (OFDC; full name: Organic Food Development Center, SEPA of China; Chinese: 国家环境保护总局有机食品发展中心; pinyin: Guójiā Huánjìng Bǎohù Zǒngjú Yǒujī Shípǐn Fāzhǎn Zhōngxīn) is an organic certification organization in China. It was founded in 1994 and is based in Nanjing. It is a branch of China's State Environmental Protection Administration, or SEPA. It was certified by the International Federation of Organic Movements in 2002.
