= KRAV =

KRAV may refer to:

- KRAV-FM, a radio station (102.3 FM) licensed to Tulsa, Oklahoma, United States
- KRAV (agriculture), a Swedish label for organic farming
- Kapap, Krav Panim El Panim self-defense system
- Krav Maga, an Israeli self-defense system
