= India Organic =

- The 'India Organic' certification mark.
- Certifying agency: APEDA
- Effective since: 2002
- Product category: Organic food
- Legal status: Advisory

India Organic is a certification mark for organically farmed food products manufactured in India. The certification mark certifies that an organic food product confirms to the National Standards for Organic Products established in 2000.

Those standards ensures that the product or the raw materials used in the product were grown through organic farming, without the use of chemical fertilizers, pesticides, or induced hormones. The certification is issued by testing centres accredited by the Agricultural and Processed Food Products Export Development Authority (APEDA) under the National Program for Organic Production of the Government of India.

Even though the standards are in effect since 2000, the certification scheme and hence the certification mark came into existence in 2002.

== Jaivik Bharat ==
Just like green & red dots on products to signify if they are vegetarian or non-vegetarian, the Food Safety and Standards Authority of India (FSSAI) in December 2017, introduced the Jaivik Bharat logo to help customers identify authentic organic food.

Food safety regulator FSSAI has permitted small organic producers, having an annual turnover of over Rs 12 lakh, to sell their produce directly to end consumers without certification till April 2020, but can not use 'Jaivik Bharat logo' on their products. Organizations are encouraging government to promote the Jaivik Bharat logo and certification process to make organic food more trustworthy and easy to recognize in India.
