= Certified Naturally Grown =

Certified Naturally Grown logo

Certified Naturally Grown (CNG) is a farm assurance program certifying produce, livestock, aquaponics, mushrooms, and apiaries for North American producers using natural practices who sell locally and directly to their customers. CNG was founded in 2002 by organic farmers Kate and Ron Khosla It is operated as a non-profit corporation, headquartered in Colorado, US.

== History ==
According to Ron Khosla, CNG was created as reaction to the legislating of organic production in the US in 2002:

== International scope ==
CNG operates in the US and Canada. CNG is recognized by IFOAM International as a Participatory Guarantee System.
