= Participatory Guarantee Systems =

Organic certification system

Participatory Guarantee Systems (PGS), as defined by IFOAM, are "locally focused quality assurance systems. They certify producers based on active participation of stakeholders and are built on a foundation of trust, social networks and knowledge exchange." They represent an alternative to third party certification, especially adapted to local markets and short supply chains. They can also complement third party certification with a private label that brings additional guarantees and transparency. PGS enable the direct participation of producers, consumers and other stakeholders in:

- the choice and definition of the standards
- the development and implementation of certification procedures
- the certification decisions

Participatory Guarantee Systems are also referred to as "participatory certification".

The International Federation of Organic Agriculture Movements (IFOAM) and the organic movement remain a leader in the concept of PGS at the international level. IFOAM is running a program to recognize PGS in the organic sector. PGS is a tool that can be adopted not only for organic agriculture but is useful in various sectors.

== History ==
The organic movement has been a pioneer in the implementation and definition of Participatory Guarantee Systems (PGS). Organic certification started in various parts of the world in the 70s and 80s based on associative systems that were very close to what is now called PGS. Some of these associations are still doing participatory certification today, such as for example Nature & Progrès in France. Even though third party certification (following ISO 65 requirements) has become the dominant form of certification in the food sector, as well as many other sectors, alternative certification systems have never ceased to exist.

In 2004, IFOAM and MAELA (the Latin American Agroecology Movement), jointly organized the first International Workshop on Alternative Certification that took place in Torres, Brazil. It is at that workshop that the concept of Participatory Guarantee Systems was adopted. At this event, an international working group on PGS was established, which later became an official Task Force under the umbrella of IFOAM. The Task Force worked on further defining PGS, and established the key elements and key features of PGS in a document entitled “Shared Visions – Shared Ideals”.

Since then IFOAM has continuously supported the development of PGS and are now advocating for their recognition by governments as valid local certification systems in cases where the organic sector is legally regulated. In parallel, other sectors have been looking into the concept to certify various products or processes.

== Government policies and regulations towards PGS ==
=== Brazil ===
In 2007, the State enacted a law that recognizes both the third-party certification and PGS for certification of organic produce. Since then, PGS certified produce have been sold domestically in the Brazilian market.

=== India ===
The Food and Agriculture Organization (FAO), IFOAM, and the Ministry of Agriculture in India initiated consultations with various stakeholders in 2005 to identify alternative certifications systems that are inclusive of the many small farmers and peasants in the country. The PGS Organic India Council was set up in 2006 as a result of these consultations. It functioned as an informal coalition of Voluntary Organizations or NGOs committed to the promotion of organic food production for domestic consumption in India, with export not being a priority at all. In April 2011, it was formally registered as a society in Goa as Participatory Guarantee Systems Organic Council (PGSOC). Many of the federal states within India have incorporated promotion of PGS for certification of organic produce in their state-level agriculture policies. At the national level, the National Centre of Organic Farming (NCOF) under the Ministry of Agriculture began to operate the PGS-India as a voluntary organic guarantee programme with the PGS-National Advisory Committee as the apex decision making body.

== See also ==
- Ecolabel
- Public participation
- Social peer-to-peer processes
