= Organic food =

Food complying with organic farming standards

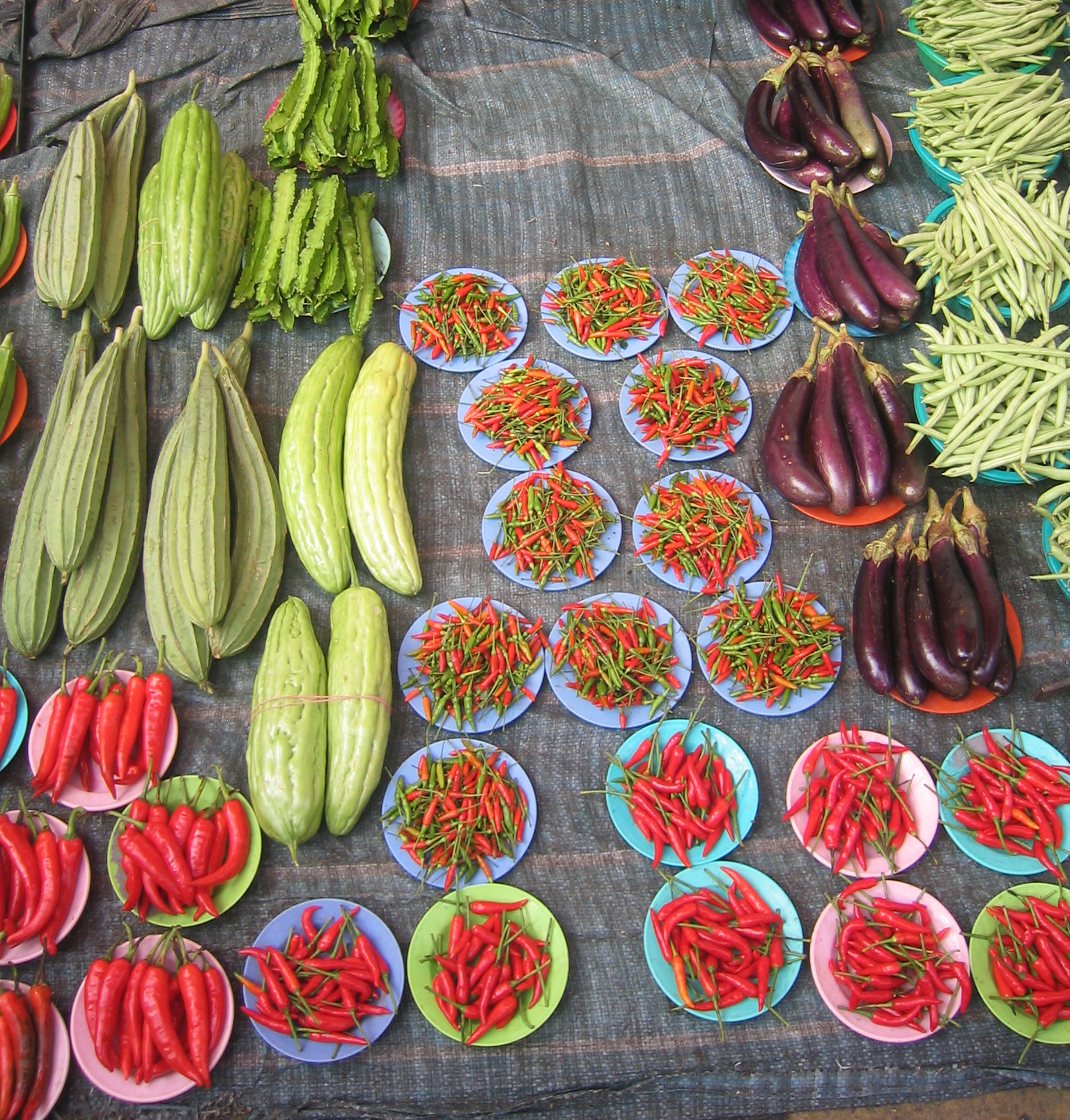
Organic produce at a farmers' market in Argentina

Organic food, also known as ecological or biological food, refers to foods and beverages produced using methods that comply with the standards of organic farming. Standards vary worldwide, but organic farming features practices that cycle resources, promote ecological balance, and conserve biodiversity. Organizations regulating organic products may restrict the use of certain pesticides and fertilizers in the farming methods used to produce such products. Organic foods are typically not processed using irradiation, industrial solvents, or synthetic food additives.

In the 21st century, the European Union, the United States, Canada, Mexico, Japan, and many other countries require producers to obtain special certification to market their food as organic. Although the produce of kitchen gardens may actually be organic, selling food with an organic label is regulated by governmental food safety authorities, such as the National Organic Program of the US Department of Agriculture (USDA) or the European Commission (EC).

From an environmental perspective, fertilizing, overproduction, and the use of pesticides in conventional farming may negatively affect ecosystems, soil health, biodiversity, groundwater, and drinking water supplies. These environmental and health issues are intended to be minimized or avoided in organic farming.

Demand for organic foods is primarily driven by consumer concerns for personal health and the environment, such as the detrimental environmental impacts of pesticides. From the perspective of scientists and consumers, there is insufficient evidence in the scientific and medical literature to support claims that organic food is either substantially safer or healthier to eat than conventional food. Organic agriculture has higher production costs and lower yields, higher labor costs, and higher consumer prices as compared to conventional farming methods.

== Meaning, history and origin of the term ==
For the vast majority of its history, agriculture can be described as having been organic; only during the 20th century was a large supply of new products, generally deemed not organic, introduced into food production. The organic farming movement arose in the 1940s in response to the industrialization of agriculture.

In 1939, Lord Northbourne coined the term organic farming in his book Look to the Land (1940), out of his conception of "the farm as organism", to describe a holistic, ecologically balanced approach to farming—in contrast to what he called chemical farming, which relied on "imported fertility" and "cannot be self-sufficient nor an organic whole". Early soil scientists also described the differences in soil composition when animal manures were used as "organic", because they contain carbon compounds, whereas superphosphates and Haber process nitrogen do not. Their respective use affects humus content of soil. This is different from the scientific use of the term "organic" in chemistry, which refers to a class of molecules that contain carbon, especially those involved in the chemistry of life. This class of molecules includes everything likely to be considered edible, as well as most pesticides and toxins too, therefore the term "organic" and, especially, the term "inorganic" (sometimes wrongly used as a contrast by the popular press) as they apply to organic chemistry is an equivocation fallacy when applied to farming, the production of food, and to foodstuffs themselves. Properly used in this agricultural science context, "organic" refers to the methods grown and processed, not necessarily the chemical composition of the food.

Ideas that organic food could be healthier and better for the environment originated in the early days of the organic movement as a result of publications like the 1943 book The Living Soil and Farming and Gardening for Health or Disease (1945).

In the industrial era, organic gardening reached a modest level of popularity in the United States in the 1950s. In the 1960s, environmentalists and the counterculture championed organic food, but it was only in the 1970s that a national marketplace for organic foods developed.

Early consumers interested in organic food would look for non-chemically treated, non-use of unapproved pesticides, fresh or minimally processed food. They mostly had to buy directly from growers. Later, "Know your farmer, know your food" became the motto of a new initiative instituted by the USDA in September 2009. Personal definitions of what constituted "organic" were developed through firsthand experience: by talking to farmers, seeing farm conditions, and farming activities. Small farms grew vegetables (and raised livestock) using organic farming practices, with or without certification, and the individual consumer monitored. Small specialty health food stores and co-operatives were instrumental to bringing organic food to a wider audience. As demand for organic foods continued to increase, high-volume sales through mass outlets such as supermarkets rapidly replaced the direct farmer connection.Today, many large corporate farms have an organic division. However, for supermarket consumers, food production is not easily observable, and product labeling, like "certified organic", is relied upon. Government regulations and third-party inspectors are looked to for assurance.

In the 1970s, interest in organic food grew with the rise of the environmental movement and was also spurred by food-related health scares like the concerns about Alar that arose in the mid-1980s.

=== Legal definition+ ===
EU logo for organic products

Organic food production is distinct from private gardening. In the EU, organic farming and organic food are more commonly known as ecological or biological, or in short "eco" and "bio".

Currently, the European Union, the United States, Canada, Japan, and many other countries require producers to obtain special certification based on government-defined standards to market food as organic within their borders. In the context of these regulations, foods marketed as organic are produced in a way that complies with organic standards set by national governments and international organic industry trade organizations.

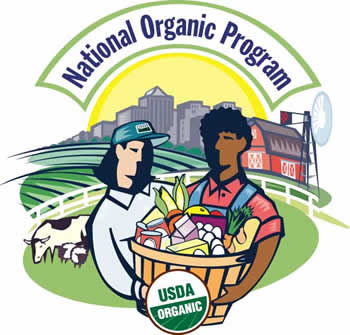
The National Organic Program (run by the USDA) is in charge of the legal definition of organic in the United States and does organic certification.

In the United States, organic production is managed in accordance with the Organic Foods Production Act of 1990 (OFPA) and regulations in Title 7, Part 205 of the Code of Federal Regulations to respond to site-specific conditions by integrating cultural, biological, and mechanical practices that foster cycling of resources, promote ecological balance, and conserve biodiversity. If livestock are involved, the livestock must be reared with regular access to pasture and without the routine use of antibiotics or growth hormones.

Processed organic food usually contains only organic ingredients. If non-organic ingredients are present, at least a certain percentage of the food's total plant and animal ingredients must be organic (95% in the United States, Canada, and Australia). Foods claiming to be organic must be free of artificial food additives, and are often processed with fewer artificial methods, materials and conditions, such as chemical ripening, food irradiation, solvents such as hexane, and genetically modified ingredients. Pesticides are allowed as long as they are not synthetic. However, under US federal organic standards, if pests and weeds are not controllable through management practices, nor via organic pesticides and herbicides, "a substance included on the National List of synthetic substances allowed for use in organic crop production may be applied to prevent, suppress, or control pests, weeds, or diseases". Several groups have called for organic standards to prohibit nanotechnology on the basis of the precautionary principle in light of unknown risks of nanotechnology. The use of nanotechnology-based products in the production of organic food is prohibited in some jurisdictions (Canada, the UK, and Australia) and is unregulated in others.

To be certified organic, products must be grown and manufactured in a manner that adheres to standards set by the country they are sold in:

- Australia: NASAA Organic Standard
- Canada: Organic Products Regulations
- European Union: EU-Eco-regulation
  - Sweden: KRAV
  - United Kingdom: DEFRA
  - Poland: Association of Polish Ecology
  - Norway: Debio Organic certification
- India: National Program for Organic Production (NPOP)
- Indonesia: BIOCert, run by Agricultural Ministry of Indonesia.
- Japan: JAS Standards
- Mexico: Consejo Nacional de Producción Orgánica, department of Sagarpa
- New Zealand: there are three bodies; BioGro, AsureQuality, and OFNZ
- United States: National Organic Program (NOP) Standards

In the United States, there are four different levels or categories for organic labeling:

1. "100% Organic": This means that all ingredients are produced organically. It also may have the USDA seal.
2. "Organic": At least 95% or more of the ingredients are organic.
3. "Made With Organic Ingredients": Contains at least 70% organic ingredients.
4. "Less Than 70% Organic Ingredients": Three of the organic ingredients must be listed under the ingredient section of the label.

In the U.S., the food label "natural" or "all natural" does not mean that the food was produced and processed organically.

== Environmental sustainability ==
From an environmental perspective, fertilizing, overproduction and the use of pesticides in conventional farming has caused, and is causing, enormous damage worldwide to local ecosystems, soil health, biodiversity, groundwater and drinking water supplies, and sometimes farmers' health and fertility.

Organic farming typically reduces some environmental impact relative to conventional farming, but the scale of reduction can be difficult to quantify and varies depending on farming methods. In some cases, reducing food waste and dietary changes might provide greater benefits. A 2020 study at the Technical University of Munich found that the greenhouse gas emissions of organically farmed plant-based food were lower than conventionally farmed plant-based food. The greenhouse gas costs of organically produced meat were approximately the same as non-organically produced meat. However, the same paper noted that a shift from conventional to organic practices would likely be beneficial for long-term efficiency and ecosystem services, and probably improve soil over time.

Recent research has suggested that the usage of organic fertilizers and cover crops can enhance soil organic carbon, nutrient cycling, and biodiversity. Simultaneously, it could also reduce greenhouse gas emissions when it is managed effectively. These practices contribute to climate change mitigation and sustainable agriculture when improving soil resilience and long-term fertility. [Khan et al., 2024]

A 2019 life-cycle assessment study found that converting the total agricultural sector (both crop and livestock production) for England and Wales to organic farming methods would result in a net increase in greenhouse gas emissions as increased overseas land use for production and import of crops would be needed to make up for lower organic yields domestically.

There are positive and negative environmental impacts of organic as compared to conventional farming. A meta-analysis of European studies revealed that in general, organic farming resulted in higher soil organic matter, lower nitrogen losses per hectare, and lower energy inputs. Others however, such as land use, nutrient pollution and greenhouse gas emissions were higher when measured per unit of agricultural output, highlighting the importance of the measurement method and farming system.

Biodiversity can also be promoted by organic farming. In a meta-analysis of 94 studies (average across all studies) it was concluded that organic farming resulted in around 30% more species richness than conventional farming, but this effect was different for each organism, crop, and landscape.

== Health and safety ==
There is little scientific evidence of benefit or harm to human health from a diet high in organic food, and conducting any sort of rigorous experiment on the subject is very difficult. A 2012 meta-analysis noted that "there have been no long-term studies of health outcomes of populations consuming predominantly organic versus conventionally produced food controlling for socioeconomic factors; such studies would be expensive to conduct." A 2009 meta-analysis noted that "most of the included articles did not study direct human health outcomes. In ten of the included studies (83%), a primary outcome was the change in antioxidant activity. Antioxidant status and activity are useful biomarkers but do not directly equate to a health outcome. Of the remaining two articles, one recorded proxy-reported measures of atopic manifestations as its primary health outcome, whereas the other article examined the fatty acid composition of breast milk and implied possible health benefits for infants from the consumption of different amounts of conjugated linoleic acids from breast milk." In addition, as discussed above, difficulties in accurately and meaningfully measuring chemical differences between organic and conventional food make it difficult to extrapolate health recommendations based solely on chemical analysis.

According to a newer review, studies found adverse effects of certain pesticides on children's cognitive development at current levels of exposure. Many pesticides show neurotoxicity in laboratory animal models and some are considered to cause endocrine disruption.

As of 2012, the scientific consensus is that while consumers may choose to buy organic produce and meat because they assume they are more nutritious than food produced through non-organic means, "the balance of current scientific evidence does not support this view." The evidence of beneficial health effects of organic food consumption is scarce, which has led researchers to call for more long-term studies. In addition, studies that suggest that organic foods may be healthier than conventional foods face significant methodological challenges, such as the correlation between organic food consumption and factors known to promote a healthy lifestyle. When the American Academy of Pediatrics reviewed the literature on organic foods in 2012, they found that "current evidence does not support any meaningful nutritional benefits or deficits from eating organic compared with conventionally grown foods, and there are no well-powered human studies that directly demonstrate health benefits or disease protection as a result of consuming an organic diet."

Prevalent use of antibiotics in livestock used in non-organic meat is a key driver of antibiotic resistance.

=== Consumer safety ===
==== Pesticide exposure ====
Claims of improved safety of organic food have largely focused on pesticide residues. These concerns are driven by the facts that "(1) acute, massive exposure to pesticides can cause significant adverse health effects; (2) food products have occasionally been contaminated with pesticides, which can result in acute toxicity; and (3) most, if not all, commercially purchased food contains trace amounts of agricultural pesticides." However, as is frequently noted in the scientific literature: "What does not follow from this, however, is that chronic exposure to the trace amounts of pesticides found in food results in demonstrable toxicity. This possibility is practically impossible to study and quantify;" therefore firm conclusions about the relative safety of organic foods have been hampered by the difficulty in proper study design and relatively small number of studies directly comparing organic food to conventional food.

Additionally, the Carcinogenic Potency Project, which is a part of the US EPA's Distributed Structure-Searchable Toxicity (DSSTox) Database Network, has been systemically testing the carcinogenicity of chemicals, both natural and synthetic, and building a publicly available database of the results for the past ~30 years. Their work attempts to fill in gaps in the scientific knowledge of the carcinogenicity of all chemicals, both natural and synthetic, as the scientists conducting the Project described in the journal, Science, in 1992:

Toxicological examination of synthetic chemicals, without similar examination of chemicals that occur naturally, has resulted in an imbalance in both the data on and the perception of chemical carcinogens. Three points that we have discussed indicate that comparisons should be made with natural as well as synthetic chemicals.

1) The vast proportion of chemicals that humans are exposed to occur naturally. Nevertheless, the public tends to view chemicals as only synthetic and to think of synthetic chemicals as toxic despite the fact that every natural chemical is also toxic at some dose. The daily average exposure of Americans to burnt material in the diet is ~2000 mg, and exposure to natural pesticides (the chemicals that plants produce to defend themselves) is ~1500 mg. In comparison, the total daily exposure to all synthetic pesticide residues combined is ~0.09 mg. Thus, we estimate that 99.99% of the pesticides humans ingest are natural. Despite this enormously greater exposure to natural chemicals, 79% (378 out of 479) of the chemicals tested for carcinogenicity in both rats and mice are synthetic (that is, do not occur naturally).
2) It has often been wrongly assumed that humans have evolved defenses against the natural chemicals in our diet but not against the synthetic chemicals. However, defenses that animals have evolved are mostly general rather than specific for particular chemicals; moreover, defenses are generally inducible and therefore protect well from low doses of both synthetic and natural chemicals.

3) Because the toxicology of natural and synthetic chemicals is similar, one expects (and finds) a similar positivity rate for carcinogenicity among synthetic and natural chemicals. The positivity rate among chemicals tested in rats and mice is ~50%. Therefore, because humans are exposed to so many more natural than synthetic chemicals (by weight and by number), humans are exposed to an enormous background of rodent carcinogens, as defined by high-dose tests on rodents. We have shown that even though only a tiny proportion of natural pesticides in plant foods have been tested, the 29 that are rodent carcinogens among the 57 tested, occur in more than 50 common plant foods. It is probable that almost every fruit and vegetable in the supermarket contains natural pesticides that are rodent carcinogens.

While studies have shown via chemical analysis, as discussed above, that organically grown fruits and vegetables have significantly lower pesticide residue levels, the significance of this finding on actual health risk reduction is debatable as both conventional foods and organic foods generally have pesticide levels (maximum residue limits) well below government established guidelines for what is considered safe. This view has been echoed by the U.S. Department of Agriculture and the UK Food Standards Agency.

A study published by the National Research Council in 1993 determined that for infants and children, the major source of exposure to pesticides is through diet. A study published in 2006 by Lu et al. measured the levels of organophosphorus pesticide exposure in 23 school children before and after replacing their diet with organic food. In this study, it was found that levels of organophosphorus pesticide exposure dropped from negligible levels to undetectable levels when the children switched to an organic diet, the authors presented this reduction as a significant reduction in risk. The conclusions presented in Lu et al. were criticized in the literature as a case of bad scientific communication.

More specifically, claims related to pesticide residue of increased risk of infertility or lower sperm counts have not been supported by the evidence in the medical literature. Likewise, the American Cancer Society (ACS) has stated their official position that "whether organic foods carry a lower risk of cancer because they are less likely to be contaminated by compounds that might cause cancer is largely unknown." Reviews have noted that the risks from microbiological sources or natural toxins are likely to be much more significant than short term or chronic risks from pesticide residues.

==== Microbiological contamination ====
Organic farming has a preference for using manure as fertilizer, compared to conventional farming in general. This practice seems to imply an increased risk of microbiological contamination, such as E. coli O157:H7, from organic food consumption, but reviews have found little evidence that the actual incidence of outbreaks can be positively linked to organic food production. The 2011 Germany E. coli O104:H4 outbreak, however, was blamed on organically farmed fenugreek sprouts.

== Public perception ==
There is a widespread public belief that organic food is safer, more nutritious, and better tasting than conventional food, which has largely contributed to the development of an organic food culture. Consumers purchase organic foods for different reasons, including concerns about the effects of conventional farming practices on the environment, human health, and animal welfare.

While there may be some differences in the nutrient and antinutrient contents of organically and conventionally produced food, the variable nature of food production, shipping, storage, and handling makes it difficult to generalize results. Claims that "organic food tastes better" are generally not supported by tests, but consumers often perceive organic food produce like fruits and vegetables to taste better.

The appeal of organic food varies with demographic group and attitudinal characteristics. Several high quality surveys find that income, educational level, physical activity, dietary habits and number of children are associated with the level of organic food consumption. USA research has found that women, young adults, liberals, and college graduates were significantly more likely to buy organic food regularly when compared to men, older age groups, people of different political affiliations, and less educated individuals. Income level and race/ethnicity did not appear to affect interest in organic foods in this same study. Furthermore, individuals who are only moderately-religious were more likely to purchase organic foods than individuals who were less religious or highly-religious. Additionally, the pursuit of organic foods was positively associated with valuing vegetarian/vegan food options, "natural" food options, and USA-made food options. Organic food may also be more appealing to people who follow other restricted diets. One study found that individuals who adhered to vegan, vegetarian, or pescetarian diet patterns incorporated substantially more organic foods in their diets when compared to omnivores.

The most important reason for purchasing organic foods seems to be beliefs about the products' health-giving properties and higher nutritional value. These beliefs are promoted by the organic food industry, and have fueled increased demand for organic food despite higher prices and difficulty in confirming these claimed benefits scientifically. Organic labels also stimulate the consumer to view the product as having more positive nutritional value.

Psychological effects such as the "halo" effect are also important motivating factors in the purchase of organic food.

In China the increasing demand for organic products of all kinds, and in particular milk, baby food and infant formula, has been "spurred by a series of food scares, the worst being the death of six children who had consumed baby formula laced with melamine" in 2009 and the 2008 Chinese milk scandal, making the Chinese market for organic milk the largest in the world as of 2014. A Pew Research Center survey in 2012 indicated that 41% of Chinese consumers thought of food safety as a very big problem, up by three times from 12% in 2008.

A 2020 study on marketing processed organic foods shows that, after much growth in the fresh organic foods sector, consumers have started to buy processed organic foods, which they sometime perceive to be just as healthy or even healthier than the non-organic version – depending on the marketing message.

=== Taste ===
There is no good evidence that organic food tastes better than its non-organic counterparts. There is evidence that some organic fruit is drier than conventionally grown fruit; a slightly drier fruit may also have a more intense flavor due to the higher concentration of flavoring substances.

Some foods which are picked when unripe, such as bananas, are cooled to prevent ripening while they are shipped to market, and then are induced to ripen quickly by exposing them to propylene or ethylene, chemicals produced by plants to induce their own ripening; as flavor and texture changes during ripening, this process may affect those qualities of the treated fruit.

== Chemical composition ==
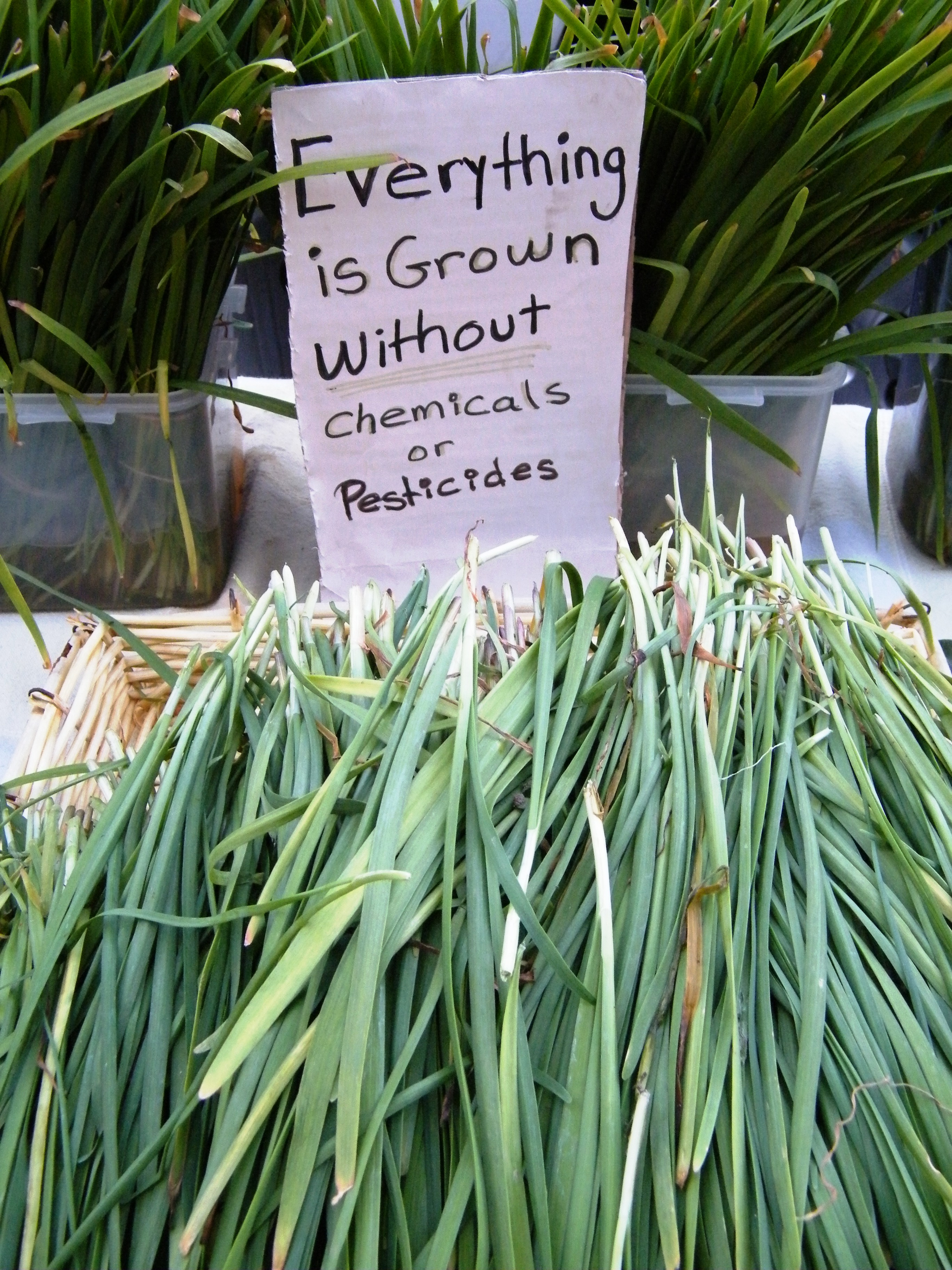
Organic vegetables at a farmers' market

With respect to chemical differences in the composition of organically grown food compared with conventionally grown food, studies have examined differences in nutrients, antinutrients, and pesticide residues. These studies generally suffer from confounding variables, and are difficult to generalize due to differences in the tests that were done, the methods of testing, and because the vagaries of agriculture affect the chemical composition of food; these variables include variations in weather (season to season as well as place to place); crop treatments (fertilizer, pesticide, etc.); soil composition; the cultivar used, and in the case of meat and dairy products, the parallel variables in animal production. Treatment of the foodstuffs after initial gathering (whether milk is pasteurized or raw), the length of time between harvest and analysis, as well as conditions of transport and storage, also affect the chemical composition of a given item of food. Additionally, there is evidence that organic produce is drier than conventionally grown produce; a higher content in any chemical category may be explained by higher concentration rather than in absolute amounts.

=== Nutrients ===
Many people believe that organic foods have higher content of nutrients and thus are healthier than conventionally produced foods. However, scientists have not been equally convinced that this is the case as the research conducted in the field has not shown consistent results.

A 2009 systematic review found that organically produced foodstuffs are not richer in vitamins and minerals than conventionally produced foodstuffs. This systematic review found a lower nitrogen and higher phosphorus content in organic produced compared to conventionally grown foodstuffs. Content of vitamin C, calcium, potassium, total soluble solids, copper, iron, nitrates, manganese, and sodium did not differ between the two categories.

A 2012 survey of the scientific literature did not find significant differences in the vitamin content of organic and conventional plant or animal products, and found that results varied from study to study. Produce studies reported on ascorbic acid (vitamin C) (31 studies), beta-carotene (a precursor for vitamin A) (12 studies), and alpha-tocopherol (a form of vitamin E) (5 studies) content; milk studies reported on beta-carotene (4 studies) and alpha-tocopherol levels (4 studies). Few studies examined vitamin content in meats, but these found no difference in beta-carotene in beef, alpha-tocopherol in pork or beef, or vitamin A (retinol) in beef. The authors analyzed 11 other nutrients reported in studies of produce. A 2011 literature review found that organic foods had a higher micronutrient content overall than conventionally produced foods.

Similarly, organic chicken contained higher levels of omega-3 fatty acids than conventional chicken. The authors found no difference in the protein or fat content of organic and conventional raw milk.

A 2016 systematic review and meta-analysis found that organic meat had comparable or slightly lower levels of saturated fat and monounsaturated fat as conventional meat, but higher levels of both overall and n-3 polyunsaturated fatty acids. Another meta-analysis published the same year found no significant differences in levels of saturated and monounsaturated fat between organic and conventional milk, but significantly higher levels of overall and n-3 polyunsaturated fatty acids in organic milk than in conventional milk.

=== Anti-nutrients ===
The amount of nitrogen content in certain vegetables, especially green leafy vegetables and tubers, has been found to be lower when grown organically as compared to conventionally. When evaluating environmental toxins such as heavy metals, the USDA has noted that organically raised chicken may have lower arsenic levels. Early literature reviews found no significant evidence that levels of arsenic, cadmium or other heavy metals differed significantly between organic and conventional food products. However, a 2014 review found lower concentrations of cadmium, particularly in organically grown grains.

=== Phytochemicals ===
A 2014 meta-analysis of 343 studies on phytochemical composition found that organically grown crops had lower cadmium and pesticide residues, and 17% higher concentrations of polyphenols than conventionally grown crops. Concentrations of phenolic acids, flavanones, stilbenes, flavones, flavonols, and anthocyanins were elevated, with flavanones being 69% higher. Studies on phytochemical composition of organic crops have numerous deficiencies, including absence of standardized measurements and poor reporting on measures of variability, duplicate or selective reporting of data, publication bias, lack of rigor in studies comparing pesticide residue levels in organic and conventional crops, the geographical origin of samples, and inconsistency of farming and post-harvest methods.

=== Pesticide residues ===
The amount of pesticides that remain in or on food is called pesticide residue. In the United States, before a pesticide can be used on a food crop, the U.S. Environmental Protection Agency must determine whether that pesticide can be used without posing a risk to human health.

A 2012 meta-analysis determined that detectable pesticide residues were found in 7% of organic produce samples and 38% of conventional produce samples. This result was statistically heterogeneous, potentially because of the variable level of detection used among these studies. Only three studies reported the prevalence of contamination exceeding maximum allowed limits; all were from the European Union. A 2014 meta-analysis found that conventionally grown produce was four times more likely to have pesticide residue than organically grown crops.

The American Cancer Society has stated that no evidence exists that the small amount of pesticide residue found on conventional foods will increase the risk of cancer, although it recommends thoroughly washing fruits and vegetables. They have also stated that there is no research to show that organic food reduces cancer risk compared to foods grown with conventional farming methods.

The Environmental Protection Agency maintains strict guidelines on the regulation of pesticides by setting a tolerance on the amount of pesticide residue allowed to be in or on any particular food. Although some residue may remain at the time of harvest, residue tend to decline as the pesticide breaks down over time. In addition, as the commodities are washed and processed prior to sale, the residues often diminish further.

=== Bacterial contamination ===
A 2012 meta-analysis determined that prevalence of E. coli contamination was not statistically significant (7% in organic produce and 6% in conventional produce). Differences in the prevalence of bacterial contamination between organic and conventional animal products were also statistically insignificant.

== Organic meat production requirements ==
=== United States ===
Organic meat certification in the United States requires farm animals to be raised according to USDA organic regulations throughout their lives. These regulations require that livestock are fed certified organic food that contains no animal byproducts. Further, organic farm animals can receive no growth hormones or antibiotics, and they must be raised using techniques that protect native species and other natural resources. Irradiation and genetic engineering are not allowed with organic animal production. One of the major differences in organic animal husbandry protocol is the "pasture rule": minimum requirements for time on pasture do vary somewhat by species and between the certifying agencies, but the common theme is to require as much time on pasture as possible and reasonable.

== Economics ==
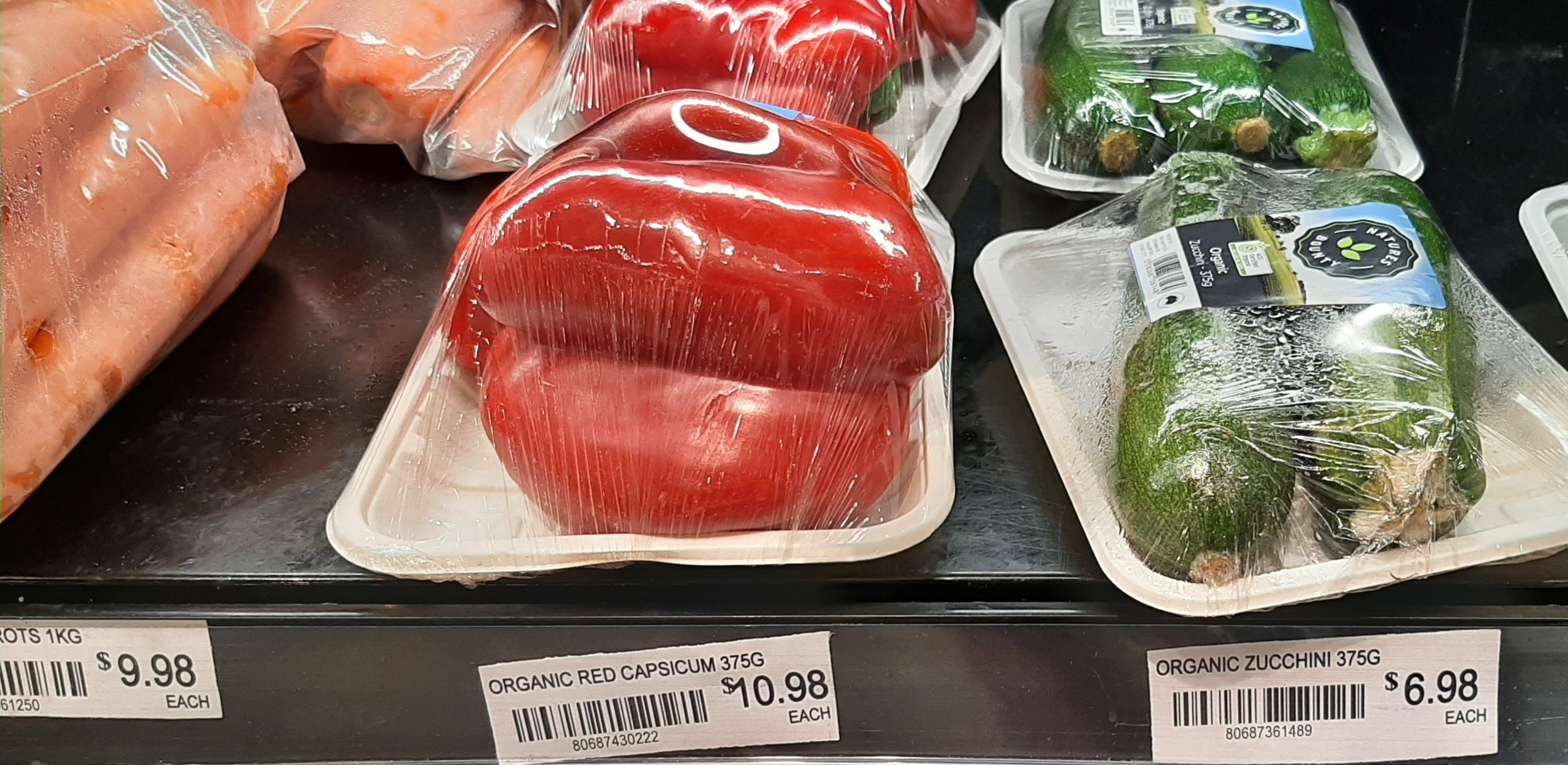
Expensive organic vegetables at an Australian grocery store

Organic agriculture has higher potential costs due to lower yields and higher labor costs, leading to higher consumer prices. Demand for organic foods is primarily driven by concerns for personal health and for the environment. Global sales for organic foods climbed by more than 170 percent since 2002 reaching more than $63 billion in 2011 while certified organic farmland remained relatively small at less than 2 percent of total farmland under production, increasing in OECD and EU countries (which account for the majority of organic production) by 35 percent for the same time period. Organic products typically cost 10% to 50% more than similar conventionally produced products, to several times the price. Processed organic foods vary in price when compared to their conventional counterparts.

While organic food accounts for about 1% of total food production worldwide, the organic food sales market is growing rapidly with between 5 and 10 percent of the food market share in the United States according to the Organic Trade Association, significantly outpacing sales growth volume in dollars of conventional food products. World organic food sales jumped from US$23 billion in 2002 to $63 billion in 2011.

=== Asia ===
Production and consumption of organic products is rising rapidly in Asia, and both China and India are becoming global producers of organic crops and a number of countries, particularly China and Japan, also becoming large consumers of organic food and drink. The disparity between production and demand, is leading to a two-tier organic food industry, typified by significant and growing imports of primary organic products such as dairy and beef from Australia, Europe, New Zealand and the United States.

China
- China's organic food production was originally for exportation in the early 2000s. Due to the food safety crisis since the late 2000s, China's domestic market outweighed the exportation market. The organic food production in China involves diverse players. Besides certified organic food production mainly conducted by private organic food companies, there are also non-certified organic farming practiced by entrepreneurs and civil society organizations. These initiatives have unique marketing channels such as ecological farmers' markets and community-supported agriculture emerging in and around Chinese major cities.
- China's domestic organic market is the fourth largest in the world. The Chinese Organic Food Development Center estimated domestic sales of organic food products to be around US$500 million per annum as of 2013. This is predicted to increase by 30 percent to 50 percent in 2014. As of 2015, organic foods made up about 1% of the total Chinese food market.
- China is the world's biggest infant formula market with $12.4 billion in sales annually; of this, organic infant formula and baby food accounted for approximately 5.5 per cent of sales in 2011. Australian organic infant formula and baby food producer Bellamy's Organic have reported that their sales in this market grew 70 per cent annually over the period 2008–2013, while Organic Dairy Farmers of Australia, reported that exports of long-life organic milk to China had grown by 20 to 30 per cent per year over the same period.

Sri Lanka

In April 2021, Sri Lanka started its "100% organic farming" program, banning imports of chemical fertilisers, pesticides and herbicides. In November 2021, it was announced that the country will lift its import ban, explained by both a lack of sudden changes to widely applied practices or education systems and contemporary economics and, by extension, food security, protests and high food costs. The effort for the first transition to a completely organic farming nation was further challenged by effects of the COVID-19 pandemic.

Bhutan

In 2013 the government of Bhutan announced that the country will become the first in the world with 100% organic farming and started a program for qualification. This program is being supported by the International Federation of Organic Agriculture Movements (IFOAM). A 2021 news report found that "globally, only Bhutan has a complete ban on synthetic pesticides". A 2018 study found that "current organic by default farming practices in Bhutan are still underdeveloped".

Japan
In 2010, the Japanese organic market was estimated to be around $1.3 billion. Based on 2024 data the Japanese organic market grew to $10.55 billion and has a Compound Annual Growth Rate (CARG) of 10.44% from 2025 to 2033.

=== North America ===
==== Canada ====
- Organic food sales surpassed $1 billion in 2006, accounting for 0.9% of food sales in Canada. By 2012, Canadian organic food sales reached $3 billion.
- British Columbians account for 13% of the Canadian population, but purchased 26% of the organic food sold in Canada in 2006.

==== Mexico ====
- Mexico is a major participant in the organic agriculture sector, with about 1.2 million hectares of certified organic land. Most organic products are sourced from wild or natural ecosystems rather than cultivated farmland. By 2021, more than 48,000 producers were certified organic, with coffee and honey accounting for the most significant number of producers, and avocados and berries generating the highest market value. Mexico is also considered a growing destination for U.S. organic exports, particularly among younger and higher-income consumers.
- Organic production and labeling are regulated under the Organic Products Law (Ley de Productos Orgánicos, LPO). Although adopted in 2006, the certification system became fully operational following regulatory measures issued between 2010 and 2013 that defined certification requirements and national labeling rules.
- In 2020, Mexico led Latin America in organic exports, with shipments valued at approximately US$390 million. Domestic consumption has also expanded, with the organic packaged food market reaching nearly US$32 million in sales in 2019, driven by demand for dairy products, soy-based foods, pasta, beverages, and savory snacks.
- The LPO certification applies to plant and animal production, wild harvesting, insect- and fungi-based products, food processing, and commercialization. While similar to U.S. standards, the Mexican system excludes hydroponics, aeroponics, and Chilean nitrate, and requires annual certification renewal. SENASICA provides oversight under the Secretariat of Agriculture, which authorizes certification bodies.

==== United States ====
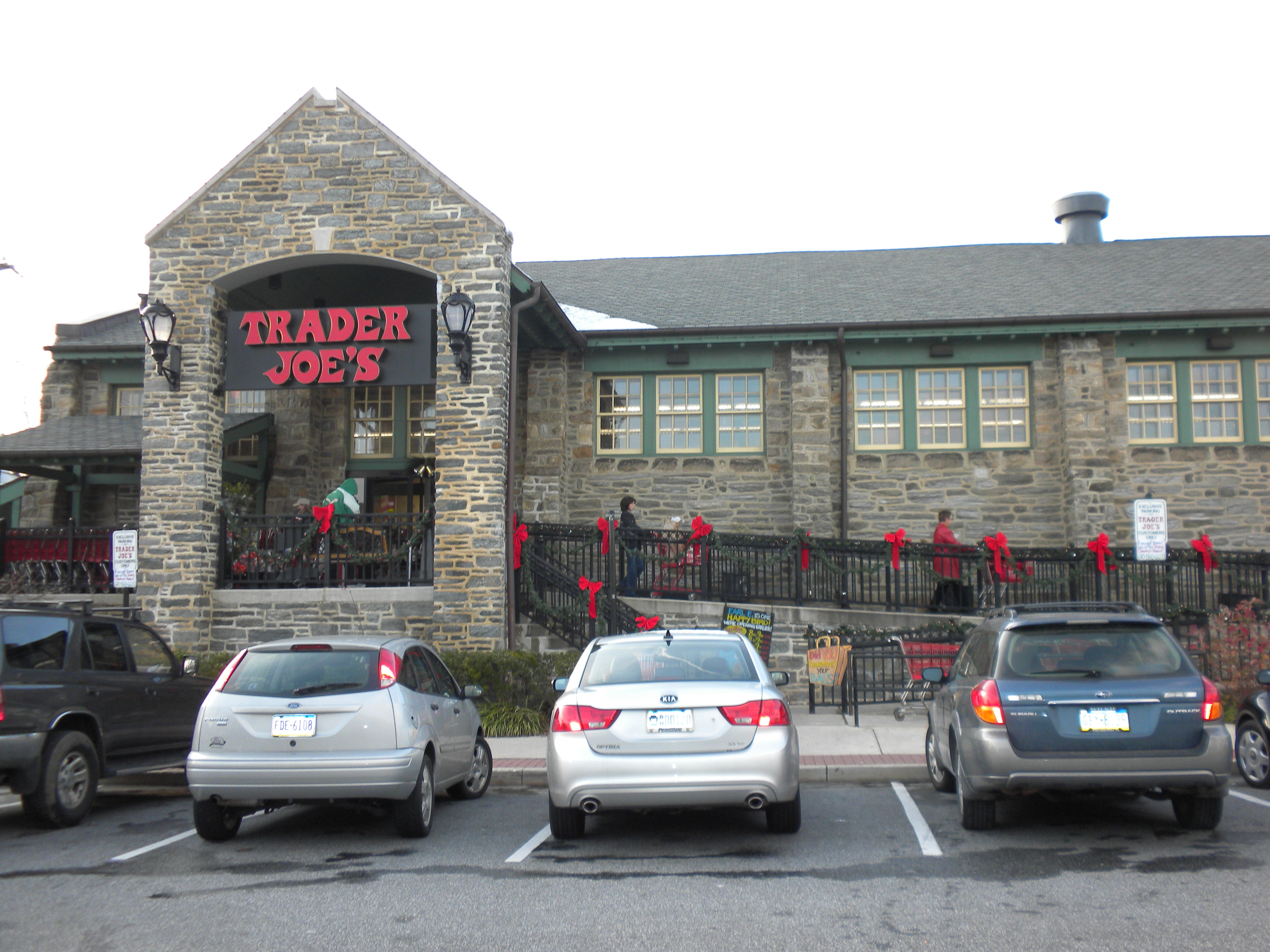
Trader Joe's is an organic grocery store in the United States

- As of 2012, organic food was the fastest growing sector of the American food industry.
- In 2005, the organic food market was only worth about US$13 billion. By 2012, the total size of the organic food market in the United States was about $30 billion (out of the total market for organic and natural consumer products being about $81 billion) In 2020 the organic food market was worth over $56 billion.
- Organic food sales have grown by 17 to 20 percent a year in the early 2000s while sales of conventional food have grown only about 2 to 3 percent a year. The US organic market grew 9.5% in 2011, breaking the $30bn barrier for the first time, and continued to outpace sales of non-organic food.
- In 2003 organic products were available in nearly 20,000 natural food stores and 73% of conventional grocery stores.
- Organic products accounted for 3.7% of total food and beverage sales, and 11.4% of all fruit and vegetable sales in the year 2009.
- As of 2012, many independent organic food processors in the USA had been acquired by multinational firms.
- For a product to become USDA organic certified, the farmer cannot plant genetically modified seeds and livestock cannot eat genetically modified plants. Farmers must provide substantial evidence showing there was no genetic modification involved in the operation.

=== Europe ===
Denmark
- In 2012, organic products accounted for 7.8% of the total retail consumption market in Denmark, the highest national market share in the world. Many public institutions have voluntarily committed themselves to buy some organic food and in Copenhagen 75% of all food served in public institutions is organic. A governmental action plan initiated in 2012–2014 aims at 60% organic food in all public institutions across the country before 2020.
- In 1987, the first Danish Action Plan was implemented which was meant to support and stimulate farmers to switch from conventional food production systems to organic ones. Since then Denmark has constantly worked on further developing the market by promoting organic food and keeping prices low in comparison to conventional food products by offering farmers subvention and extra support if they choose to produce organic food. Then and even today is the bench mark for organic food policy and certification of organic food in the whole world. The new European Organic food label and organic food policy was developed based on the 1987 Danish Model.
Austria
In 2011, 7.4% of all food products sold in Austrian supermarkets (including discount stores) were organic. In 2007, 8,000 different organic products were available.
Italy
Since 2000, the use of some organic food is compulsory in Italian schools and hospitals. A 2002 law of the Emilia Romagna region implemented in 2005, explicitly requires that the food in nursery and primary schools (from 3 months to 10 years) must be 100% organic, and the food in meals at schools, universities and hospitals must be at least 35% organic.
Poland
In 2005 7 percent of Polish consumers buy food that was produced according to the EU-Eco-regulation. The value of the organic market is estimated at 50 million euros (2006).
Romania
70%–80% of the local organic production, amounting to 100 million euros in 2010, is exported. The organic products market grew to 50 million euros in 2010.
Switzerland
As of 2012, 11 per cent of Swiss farms are organic. Bio Suisse, the Swiss organic producers' association, provides guidelines for organic farmers.
Ukraine
- During 2022, despite the full-scale war Ukraine exported 245,600 metric tons of organic products in the amount of USD 219 million to 36 countries around the world which is almost the same as in 2021 (261,000 metric tonnes, USD 222 million). 95% of organic products from Ukraine were exported to European countries. Most products were exported by rail and road. Export volumes by vessels decreased, in particular, air transportation for export from Ukraine became impossible. The largest importing countries of Ukrainian organic products in 2022 were the Netherlands, Germany, Austria, Switzerland, Poland, Lithuania, the United States, Italy, the United Kingdom, and the Czech Republic. Ukrainian organic producers also exported to some countries in Asia and North America.
- According to the European Commission's Report, in 2022, Ukraine ranked the 3rd out of 125 countries by volume of organic products imported to the EU. Thus, in 2022, the EU imported 2.73 million tonnes of organic agri-food products, including 219 thousand tonnes (8%) from Ukraine, which is 85% of total Ukrainian organic export. Thus, Ukraine had leading positions among the exporting countries to the EU, having exported 93 thousand tonnes (77.1%) of cereals (excluding wheat and rice) and 20 thousand tonnes (22%) of organic oilseeds (excluding soybeans).
- In Ukraine, organic is regulated in accordance with the Law of Ukraine On Basic Principles and Requirements for Organic Production, Circulation and Labelling of Organic Products. Majority of Ukrainian producers, processing units, traders are also certified under international organic legislation (e.g. EU Organic Regulations, NOP, etc. The Order on the Approval of the State Logo for Organic Products was approved by the Ministry of Agrarian Policy and Food of Ukraine in 2019. The state logo for organic products is registered as a trademark and owned by the Ministry of Agrarian Policy and Food of Ukraine. The requirements for proper use of the Ukrainian state logo for organic products and labelling are described on the website of the Ministry of Agrarian Policy and Food of Ukraine as well as in the Methodical Recommendations on the Use of the State Logo for Organic Products.
United Kingdom
Organic food sales increased from just over £100 million in 1993/94 to £1.21 billion in 2004 (an 11% increase on 2003). In 2010, the UK sales of organic products fell 5.9% to £1.73 billion. 86% of households buy organic products, the most popular categories being dairies (30.5% of sales) and fresh fruits and vegetables (23.2% of sales). As of 2011, 4.2% of UK farmland is organically managed.

=== Latin America ===
Cuba
After the collapse of the Soviet Union in 1991, agricultural inputs that had previously been purchased from Eastern bloc countries were no longer available in Cuba, and many Cuban farms converted to organic methods out of necessity. Consequently, organic agriculture is a mainstream practice in Cuba, while it remains an alternative practice in most other countries. Although some products called organic in Cuba would not satisfy certification requirements in other countries (crops may be genetically modified, for example), Cuba exports organic citrus and citrus juices to EU markets that meet EU organic standards. Cuba's forced conversion to organic methods may position the country to be a global supplier of organic products.

== See also ==
- Agroecology
- Genetically modified food
- List of diets
- List of organic food topics
- List of foods
- Organic clothing
- Organic food culture
- Organic livestock farming
- Permaculture
- Regenerative agriculture
- Soil Association
- Whole food
- Silent Spring, a book about pesticides and the environment by Rachel Carson
