= EU-organic production-regulation =

Regulation (EEC) No. 834/2007
- European Union regulation
- Title: Council Regulation (EEC) No. 834/2007 of 28 June 2007 on organic production and labelling of organic products and repealing Regulation (EEC) No 2092/91
- Made by: European Commission
- Made under: Art. 43 TEC

History
- Date made: 2007-06-28

Other legislation
- Replaces: (EEC) No. 2092/91
- Amended by: No. 889/2008

Regulation (EEC) No. 2092/91
- European Union regulation
- Title: Council Regulation (EEC) No. 2092/91 of 24 June 1991 on organic production of agricultural products and indications referring thereto on agricultural products and foodstuffs
- Made by: European Commission
- Made under: Art. 43 TEC
- Journal reference: OJ L 198, 1991-07-22, pp. 1–15

History
- Date made: 1991-06-24

Other legislation
- Amended by: (EC) No. 1804/1999
- Replaced by: (EC) No. 834/2007

The EU-organic production-regulation is a part of the European Union regulation that sets rules about the production of organic agricultural and livestock products and how to label them. In the EU, organic farming and organic food are more commonly known as ecological or biological.

The regulation is derived from the guidelines of the International Federation of Organic Agriculture Movements (IFOAM), which is an association of about 800 member organizations in 119 countries.

== History ==
The regulation of organic farming and labelling originates from 1991, starting with Regulation (EEC) No 2092/91 of 24 June 1991.

In 1999 it was supplemented by regulation (EC) No. 1804/1999, which regulates the raising, labelling and inspection of the most relevant animal species (i.e. cattle, sheep, goats, horses and poultry). This agreement covers such issues as foodstuffs, disease prevention and veterinary treatments, animal welfare, husbandry practices and the management of manure. Genetically modified organisms (GMOs) and products derived from GMOs are explicitly excluded from organic production methods.

Regulation No. 834/2007 replaced 2092/91 in 2007. Regulation No. 889/2008 would supplement the breeding of animal species and the regulation No. 1235/2008 also regulates the import of ecologically grown agricultural products from third countries.

As of January 2022, organic production is regulated by Regulation (EU) No. 2018/848 of 30 May 2018.

== Organic food logo ==
EU certified organic food logo

In July 2010, a new logo for the organic certification label was chosen to replace the earlier national labels for usage of organic food that meet the criteria of the EU Eco regulation. The regulation also states that the term biological or ecological may be used on products in the EU if the product consists of at least 95% ingredients from EU regulated organic food.

== See also ==
- 1991 in the environment
- National Organic Program, the equivalent regulation in the United States
- European Food Safety Authority
