= KRAV (agriculture) =

Swedish sustainable agriculture organization

- Founded: 1985

KRAV is the main Swedish organization that develops and maintains regulations for ecological sustainable agriculture, founded in 1985 by a consortium of organic producers.

KRAV is a member of International Federation of Organic Agriculture Movements.
