= Organic clothing =

Clothing made from materials complying with organic standards

Organic clothing is clothing made from materials raised in or grown in compliance with organic agricultural standards. Organic clothing may be composed of cotton, jute, linen, silk, ramie, or wool. In the United States, textiles do not need to be 100% organic to use the organic label. A more general term is organic textiles, which includes both apparel and home textiles. The technical requirements in terms of certification and origin generally remain the same for organic clothing and organic textiles.

== See also ==
- Organic cotton
- Organic food culture
- Organic wool
- Sustainable clothing
