= IFOAM =

Non-governmental organization

International Federation of Organic Agriculture Movements (IFOAM) - Organics International
- Formation: 1972
- Type: NGO
- Headquarters: Bonn, Germany
- Region served: Global
- Members: 700+
- Official language: English
- President: Karen Mapusua
- Main organ: General Assembly
- Staff: 21
- Website: www.ifoam.bio

IFOAM – Organics International (formerly known as the International Federation of Organic Agriculture Movements) is a worldwide organization advocating for organics, with over 700 affiliates in more than 100 countries and territories.

== History ==
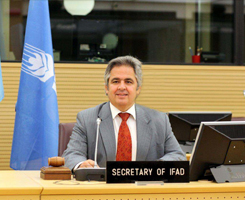
Rașit Pertev, Secretary of the International Fund for Agricultural Development, was a keynote speaker at the 2014 Organic World Congress in Istanbul, Turkey.

IFOAM – Organics International was started by the president of the French farmer organization Nature et Progrès, Roland Chevriot. The process began on 05 November 1972, in Versailles, France, during an international organic agriculture congress organized by Nature et Progrès.

There were five members at the congress representing different organizations including Lady Eve Balfour of the Soil Association of the United Kingdom, Kjell Arman of the Swedish Biodynamic Association, Pauline Raphaely of the Soil Association of South Africa, Jerome Goldstein of Rodale Press of the United States, and Roland Chevriot of Nature et Progrès of France.

In the beginning, the name of the organization was the International Federation of Organic Agriculture Movements. The founders envisioned that the federation would meet what they saw as a major need: a unified, organized voice for organic food and the diffusion and exchange of information on the principles and practices of organic agriculture across national and geographical boundaries. In 2015, the name changed to IFOAM - Organics International.

On 19 October 1998, participants at the 12th Scientific Conference of IFOAM - Organics International issued the Mar del Plata Declaration, where more than 600 delegates from over 60 countries voted unanimously to exclude the use of genetically modified organisms (GMOs) in food production and agriculture. From that point onwards, GMOs have been categorically excluded from organic farming and denounced by the organic movement.

== Structure ==
Linda Bullard, former President of IFOAM - Organics International), Dr. Vandana Shiva, winner of the Right Livelihood Award, and Magda Aelvoet, Belgian Minister of State and former Health and Environment Minister, celebrate the landmark decision of the European Patent Office to uphold a decision to revoke in its entirety a patent on a fungicidal product derived from seeds of the Neem, a tree indigenous to the Indian subcontinent.

The GA of IFOAM – Organics International serves as the highest authority of the organization, and it elects the world board of the organization for a three-year term. The world board is a group of 10 people working voluntarily to guide the organization. In September 2021, Karen Mapusua from Fiji was elected as the president of the organization’s world board.

The 2021 world board was elected by the GA of IFOAM - Organics International in September 2021, the first-ever digital one. The Intercontinental Network of Organic Farmers Organizations (INOFO) is an autonomous self-organized structure within IFOAM - Organics International for organic farming organizations. The board appoints members to official committees, working groups, and task forces based on the recommendation of the membership of the organization.

Member organizations have established regional bodies including IFOAM Organics Asia, IFOAM Organics Europe, IFOAM AgriBioMediterraneo, IFOAM Southern African Network, IFOAM America Latina, IFOAM North America, IFOAM Euro-Asia, national groups including IFOAM France, IFOAM Iran and IFOAM Japan. Furthermore, IFOAM has established sectoral platforms that include the IFOAM Organic Husbandry Alliance, IFOAM Apiculture Forum, IFOAM Aquaculture, Technology Innovation Platform of IFOAM and IFOAM Seeds Platform.

== See also ==
- Association Kokopelli – French non-profit organization
- Environmental justice
- EU-Eco-regulation
- Global Ecolabelling Network – Non-profit network
- Heirloom plant – Historic food crop cultivar
- Research Institute of Organic Agriculture – Swiss-based research institute
- UTZ Certified – Program and label for sustainable farming
