= Dollar voting =

Aspect of consumer behavior

Dollar voting is an analogy that refers to the theoretical impact of consumer choice on producers' actions by means of the flow of consumer payments to producers for their goods and services.

== Overview ==
In some principles textbooks of the mid-20th century, the term "dollar voting" was used to describe the process by which consumers' choices influence firms' production decisions. Products that consumers buy will tend to be produced in the future. Products that do not sell as well as expected will receive fewer productive resources in the future. According to this analogy, consumers vote for "winners" and "losers" with their purchases. This argument was used to explain market allocations of goods and services under the catchphrase "consumer sovereignty".

Consumer boycotts sometimes aim to change producers' behaviour. The goals of selective boycotts, or dollar voting, have been diverse, including cutting corporate revenues, removal of key executives, and reputational damage.

The modern idea of dollar voting can be traced back to its development by James M. Buchanan in Individual Choice in Voting and the Market. As a public choice theorist, Buchanan considered economic participation by the individual to be a form of pure democracy. Also known as political consumerism, the history of dollar voting in the United States can be traced back to the American Revolution, when colonists boycotted several British products in protest of taxation without representation.

If voters feel disenfranchised politically, they may instead use their spending power to influence politics and the economy. Consumers use dollar voting because they hope to impact society's values and the use of resources.

== Criticisms ==
Dollar voting has faced criticism in modern America for being class-bound. Dollar voting is archetypically used by middle and upper middle class consumers who spend their money at local farmers markets, community agricultural programs, and the preparation of "slow food". These purchases do not affect low-income producers and consumers in the food market. Dollar voting has also been criticized as a form of conspicuous consumption for the well-off.

Dollar voting has also been criticized for being a sort of consumer vigilantism. While most economists and economic philosophers accept that consumers have a right to their personal moral choices in the market, large-scale movements to influence consumer spending could have potentially dangerous implications.

Efforts to encourage corporations and firms to act in environmentally friendly ways have become popular. It is unclear whether firms that create negative environmental externalities will actually change their method of production to satisfy such desires. Dollar voting also could dissuade citizens from law-making efforts to check unmitigated self-interest in firms and consumers, instead shifting this responsibility over to the market.

== See also ==
- Crowd funding
- Demonstrated preference
- Dispersed knowledge
- Ethical consumerism
- Foot voting
- Other people's money
- Tax choice
- Consumer sovereignty
- Buycott.com
