= Guilt-free consumption =

Guilt-free consumption (GFC) is a pattern of consumption based on the minimization of the sense of guilt which consumers incur when purchasing products or commercial services.

The spread of ethical consumerism, and the following availability of information about the ethicality of products, can be understood as the driving force of guilt free consumption. In this sense, the feeling of guilt experienced by consumers is fostered by their knowledge of the potential consequences of their choices. The tension between consumers' values and the awareness that their actions may run counter to those same values, manifests itself as a potent, nagging guilt.

Consumers are therefore induced to prefer those companies which are able to offer sustainable practices and products in order to minimize their sense of guiltiness.

== Areas of concern ==
GFC is concerned with three main dimensions in which the sense of guilt arises:

- Self: Guilt about the individual's impact on themselves or their family. For example, a person's anxiety about their physical or mental well-being.
- Society and nature: Guilt about the individual's social impact, including damage directly or indirectly caused to others (including other living creatures). For example, a person's concern about poor working conditions, sub-poverty wages, and exploitation.
- Planet: Guilt about an individual's environmental impact. For example, a person's guilt about wasteful packaging, CO_{2} emissions, and rainforest destruction.

However, there is a fourth dimension that mainly affects newly minted urban consumers: the so-called "cultural-guilt"; the feeling of culpability caused by the split between global and traditional consumption, e.g. people worrying about the abandoning of their identity in favor of globalization (globalized culture of consumerism).

A totally guilt free consumption might be difficult or impossible to achieve, since products or servicing reducing guilt on one dimension might foster the same negative feeling on an other; as a consequence GFC aims at minimizing guilt rather than striving for a complete deletion.

== Guilt and the divided self ==
Guilt arises when individuals fail in meeting their own personal self-standards or when a conflict among what the theory of discrepancy calls "selves", emerges.

According to the self-discrepancy theory there are a number of "selves" guiding and shaping one's behavior:

- the actual self - the present self that one is.
- the ideal self - the self toward which one strives and aspires to be.
- the ought self - the self toward which a sense of duty or responsibility is perceived and felt.

Guilt can be associated with failure to meet social expectations, thus self-standards can be heavily influenced by social norms which lead to the juxtaposition between one's own judgement of one's behavior and others' judgements of one's behavior. However, individuals are eventually motivated to meet self-standards regardless to others's judgement since social norms become easily internalized through socialization.

The level of private self characterizing guilt leads to the definition of it as the negative emotional state associated with possible objection to one's actions, inaction, circumstances or intentions.

Consumers are therefore torn between the awareness of their potentially negative impact, and their willingness to enjoying the whole process of consumption. GFC can be understood as a minimization of the feeling of guilt without necessarily aiming at zero impact condition.

This unachievable freedom from negative emotional states, can be seen in the light of the psychological nature of human beings as characterized by a very heterogeneous mix of status, among which the genuine pleasure derived from consumption. The fact that consumers feel the need to satisfy this sort of hedonism, makes it impossible for them to completely stop their damaging consumption patterns; as a consequences companies want to actively reduce the dichotomy by acting as mediator between the various selves.

== Guilt and buyer's remorse ==
GFC can be seen as a way to prevent buyer's remorse, although the latter is a post-purchase dissonance mainly associated with monetary concerns.

The distinction between the two phenomena comes from the fact that buyer's remorse involves the negative feelings emerging after an excessively expensive product or service, while GFC embraces three different areas of concern. Moreover, buyer's remorse arises after the purchase is accomplished and companies can actively try to alleviate it through money back guarantees, while the sense of guiltiness involving GFC is minimized at the root when firms engage themselves in more responsible production and distribution processes.

== GFC in luxury goods ==
GFC has been influencing the luxury market seeing as even the wealthiest consumers are becoming suspicious with regard to brands promoting unethically produced products that are positioned as being elements of a fancy lifestyle.

Wealthy consumers indeed seem more and more influenced by the so-called "existential guilt", a particular sense of guilt individuals may even experience if they feel they benefit from unjustified privileges relative to others or if they accept some responsibility for social ills.

As a consequence, affluent consumers are putting global and social considerations as their first priority, strengthening the shift from conspicuous consumption to more conscientious buying habits.

One popular way in which luxury brands are approaching and exploiting guilt-free consumption, is the attenuation of consumers' sense of guilt, hopefully followed by some sort of "license to indulge" in the desired product or service, through the promotion of charity organizations partnerships.

Guilt free consumption in luxury goods can be linked to Thorstein Veblen's book The Theory of the Leisure Class: An Economic Study in the Evolution of Institutions regarding conspicuous consumption (expenditure on or consumption of luxuries on a lavish scale in the attempt to enhance one’s prestige or social status). “Unproductive consumption of goods is honourable, primarily as a mark of prowess and a perquisite of human dignity; secondarily it becomes substantially honourable in itself, especially the consumption of the more desirable things”<The Theory of the Leisure Class: An Economic Study in the Evolution of Institutions><1899> Consumption of these luxury goods have been happening for centuries in order to fulfill one's desires and to maintain high class in society or participate in social mobility commonly tracing back to warriors and nobles. These people participate in what is commonly referred to as "consumerism" in which consumers engage in continuous wasteful or conspicuous consumption in order to satisfy their consumer impulse. A common consequence of this practice is people fail to satisfy their inner impulse to consume, the person as a whole is not always happy. These luxury goods are seen as desirable because of the scarcity and the status of those who consume them. When a consumer purchases these products because of the status of those who consume them it is known as "emulative behavior". Advertisements are also a driving force for the increase in consumers' willingness to pay and consume conspicuously of brand names and luxury goods. However, consumerism and conspicuous consumption helped influence some Keynesian philosophy where consumer spending is heavily responsible for influencing the economy and encouraged civilians to consume products for the sake of economic growth.

== Companies' involvement ==
GFC's trend affected the way in which companies engage themselves in the creation of value through products, services, production processes and social initiatives. This tendency, aimed at supporting a more conscious and guiltless pattern of consumption, begun even before GFC's full development.

The Body Shop anticipated the trend by joining environmental and human rights campaigns, for example inviting people to wash up empty bottles of products and having them refilled at the shop. Other examples of the British firm's involvement in social causes are its minimal packaging policy and the project aimed at helping disadvantaged communities through Community Trade program.

In more recent times, there has been fuller engagement of firms in helping consumers minimizing their sense of guilt. In some cases companies focused on absolving one of the three areas of concern related to guilt-free consumption, but it is not always clear to which areas a particular strategy can be linked to since the three dimensions are often overlapping.

- Guilt free consumption implementation in the first area of concern.

The strategy implemented by McDonald's and Burger King can be understood in the light of the first class of GFC areas of concern: the personal self. In 2013 Burger King launched Satisfires, a line of fries with 40% of fat and 30% of calories less than McDonald's equivalent. Meanwhile, McDonald's announced a global partnership with the Alliance for a Healthier Generation in order to provide consumers with healthier meals: side-salad, fruit or vegetables as substitute for fried. Furthermore, the company decided that at least 70% of the food prepared and sold by a specific store of McDonald's, had to come from that same country in which the store was located.

- Guilt-free consumption's implementation in the second area of concern.

In the Netherlands, a new generation of mobile phones, by the local firm Fairphone, provided smartphones which are manufactured without using minerals and with a special care of workers' welfare. This type of strategy fits the second area of concern related to GFC, therefore involving society and nature.

- Guilt-free consumption's implementation in the third area of concern.

Miya's Sushi, a sushi restaurant chain in Connecticut, went beyond simply avoiding offering endangered fish species in its menu, it provided delicacies made with invasive species that were damaging the local habitat.

These two cases can be linked to the third dimension of GFC regarding the planet.

== See also ==
- Cause marketing
- Consumer behaviour
- Critical consumerism
- Eco-gastronomy
- Green brands
- Organic food culture
