= Eco-gastronomy =

Approach to food consumption

Eco-gastronomy is an approach to alternative consumption that stresses the importance of the interaction between humans and food and the effect produced by that. It aims to get a healthier and more sustainable food and, at the same time, to reduce the impact on the environment, from the productive and the consumptive side.

== Term ==
The Latin term eco refers to how organisms relate to their environment, while gastronomy, according to food philosopher Jean Anthelme Brillat-Savarin, is the intelligent knowledge of whatever concerns man's nourishment.

The fusion of these two words creates the concept of eco-gastronomy. The prefix eco is used to highlight the connections between "the art and appreciation of food" and every issue related to the process of food production and consumption, from the environmental care to the social and ethical concerns.

Ecogastronomy "links food and humans, while bringing attention to the responsibility that all people have for the health and well-being of our food ways".

== Context ==
The concept of eco-gastronomy belongs to the field of food consumption that is rather criticized and contested as it involves a series of ethical issues, such as immediate versus delayed gratification, nature versus culture, necessity versus luxury, body versus mind, etc.

In this context there are a series of forms of critical and alternative consumption, associated by their critiques (generally deriving from the homogenization of capitalist mode of production) and their proposals of alternative lifestyles. A cohesive movement of alternative consumption does not exist, since every form of alternative consumption differs in its target and scope. What these phenomena have in common is the belief that consumers can, and should, use their power of choice to modify market relations, in order to make them fairer and more conducive to a good life for all.

More than a simple form of alternative consumption, eco-gastronomy is an approach that can be adopted in this context. The same attention is given both to the individual and to the community/nature side. Regarding the scope, the eco-gastronomic approach tries to find alternative forms of integration in the capitalist culture, based on the attention given to the quality of food and on the relations between humans and their impact on the environment.

== Connections with the Slow Food movement ==
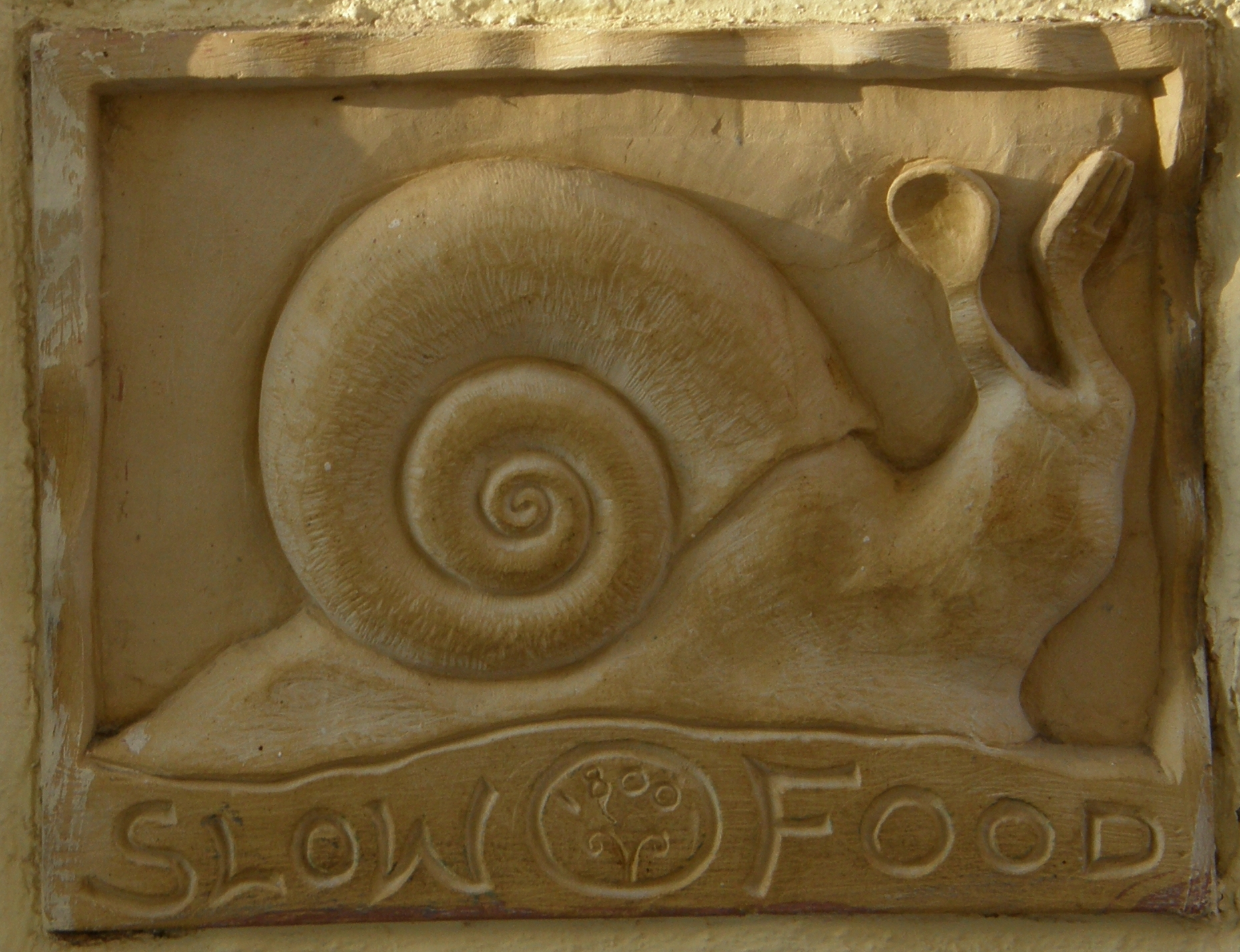
Slow Food

The concept indeed is strictly related to that one of Slow Food. In fact, the term eco-gastronomy was coined by the non-profit organization's founder, Carlo Petrini. While the latter can be defined as a movement, eco-gastronomy has broader and wider connotations: rather than a simple movement, it is an approach that can be adopted in order to fulfill some form of alternative consumption. The Slow Food movement is an example of a form of critical consumption that has adopted, throughout the years, an eco-gastronomic approach.

Indeed, while in the early stages, the concept of sustainability, that is crucial to eco-gastronomy, was not greatly contemplated by the Slow Food movement, in the last years SF seems to have shifted focus from the safeguard of typical foods to the safeguard of their cultural and environmental premises. The emphasis has been especially put on biodiversity, sustainable agriculture and responsible consumption.

In 2005, Carlo Petrini provided a theoretical perspective of eco-gastronomy stating that "agriculture and ecology are part of gastronomy because they help us understand where our food comes from and produce it in the best possible way – by simultaneously observing the principles of taste, respect for the environment and biodiversity".

Nowadays, Slow Food is no more only about paying attention to the quality of food and the pleasure of eating. Food thus must be produced according to ecological methods, free from pesticides and artificial fertilizer. Clean is an essential quality in the food people eat, but the concept is also concerned in the landscape where the food is produced.

As Petrini continues:

"If you love food but aren't environmentally aware you're at best naïve, and at worst, stupid. But an ecologist who is not a gourmet is ... well, he's just boring"
(Petrini 2007 : 68)

== Projects and applications ==
In a context made of a growing spread of movements, ideologies and approaches which promote critical consumption, the concept of eco-gastronomy has prepared the ground to a variety of projects. Starting from single actions and choices of everyone's daily life, these projects aim to create an always larger network of people who share a sustainable life style.

As shown below, the key players are not only consumers and producers, but also, at a lower level, students, families and researchers.

=== Dual Major in Eco-gastronomy by the University of New Hampshire ===
In 2006, the University of New Hampshire signed the Slow Food Agreements of Intentions and Collaborations in order to create a worldwide network of universities and research institutions to promote protection and agricultural biodiversity, support of the rights of people to self-determination with regard to food and educate civilized society and train workers in the food and agricultural sector.

In 2008 the University of New Hampshire, in collaboration with other institutions, approved with the Board of Trustees the dual major in Eco-Gastronomy.

The mission of this unique dual major is to provide students with the necessary skills and knowledge in order to work in an evolving food community integrating sustainable agriculture, food and nutrition following the principles of the eco-gastronomic approach.

=== The Eco-gastronomy project by the University of Gastronomic Sciences ===
The University of Gastronomic Sciences UNISG was founded in Italy in 2004 by Slow Food International.

The Eco-Gastronomy project was launched in November 2015 by this university. It is a multi-year initiative to create an international exchange of knowledge about food and food systems.

The mission of the project is to build an international network of food visionaries, building innovation, flexibility, and justice into global food systems. Indeed, this project is developed in fourteen countries around the world where local partners collaborate on the development of an ecological-philosophical approach of food.

== See also ==
- Biodiversity
- Carlo Petrini
- Critical consumerism
- Ecology
- Fast food
- Guilt-free consumption
- Organic food culture
