= Ethical consumerism =

Type of consumer activism

Ethical consumerism, also known as ethical consumption, ethical purchasing, moral purchasing, ethical sourcing, or ethical shopping, and is also associated with sustainable and green consumerism. It is a type of consumer activism based on the concept of dollar voting. People engage in ethical consumerism by purchasing ethically made products that support small-scale manufacturers or local artisans and protect animals and the environment. Conversely, they boycott products that exploit children as workers, are tested on animals, or damage the environment.

The term "ethical consumer", now used generically, was first popularised by the UK magazine Ethical Consumer, first published in 1989. Ethical Consumer magazine's key innovation was to produce "ratings tables", inspired by the criteria-based approach of the then-emerging ethical investment movement. Ethical Consumer's ratings tables awarded companies negative marks (and overall scores, starting in 2005) across a range of ethical and environmental categories such as "animal rights", "human rights", and "pollution and toxics", empowering consumers to make ethically informed consumption choices and providing campaigners with reliable information on corporate behaviour. Such criteria-based ethical and environmental ratings have subsequently become commonplace both in providing consumer information and in business-to-business corporate social responsibility and sustainability ratings such as those provided by Innovest, Calvert Foundation, Domini, IRRC, TIAA–CREF, and KLD Analytics. Today, Bloomberg and Reuters provide "environmental, social, and governance" ratings directly to the financial data screens of hundreds of thousands of stock market traders. The nonprofit Ethical Consumer Research Association continues to publish Ethical Consumer and its associated website, which provides free access to ethical rating tables.

Although single-source ethical consumerism guides such as Ethical Consumer, Shop Ethical, and the Good Shopping Guide are popular, they suffer from incomplete coverage. User-generated ethical reviews are more likely, long-term, to provide democratic, in-depth coverage of a wider range of products and businesses. The Green Stars Project promotes the idea of including ethical ratings (on a scale of one to five green stars) alongside conventional ratings on retail sites such as Amazon or review sites such as Yelp.

The term "political consumerism", first used in a study titled "The Gender Gap Reversed: Political Consumerism as a Women-Friendly Form of Civic and Political Engagement" by authors Dietlind Stolle and Michele Micheletti (2003), is identical to the idea of ethical consumerism. However, in this study, the authors found that political consumerism as a form of social participation often went overlooked at the time of writing and needed to be accounted for in future studies of social participation. However, in "From Ethical Consumerism to Political Consumption", author Nick Clarke argues that political consumerism allows for marginalized groups, such as women, to participate in political advocacy in non-bureaucratic ways that draw attention to governmental weaknesses. Political consumerism has also been criticised on the basis that "it cannot work", or that it displays class bias. The widespread development of political consumerism is hampered by substantial mundane consumption, which does not afford reflective choice, along with complexities of everyday life, which demand negotiations between conflicting moral and ethical considerations.

== The consumer groups ==
In the late 19th and early 20th centuries, people in industrialized countries began formal consumer movements to ensure that they would get value for their money in terms of the things they purchased. These movements focused on the unfair labor practices of the companies, and on labelling requirements of food, cosmetics, drugs, etc.

Examples of the consumer movements were the Consumer League which was established in New York, US in 1891, the National Consumers League created in the US in 1898, and the Consumers Council which was established during World War I in Great Britain. During this time workers were neither well-paid nor did they have secure employment with benefit of social protection; similarly, working conditions were decent and the Irish Trade Union movement focused the International Labour Organization (ILO) policy of campaigning for decent work wherever there was an opportunity for job improvement or job creation.

== Basis ==
=== Global morality ===
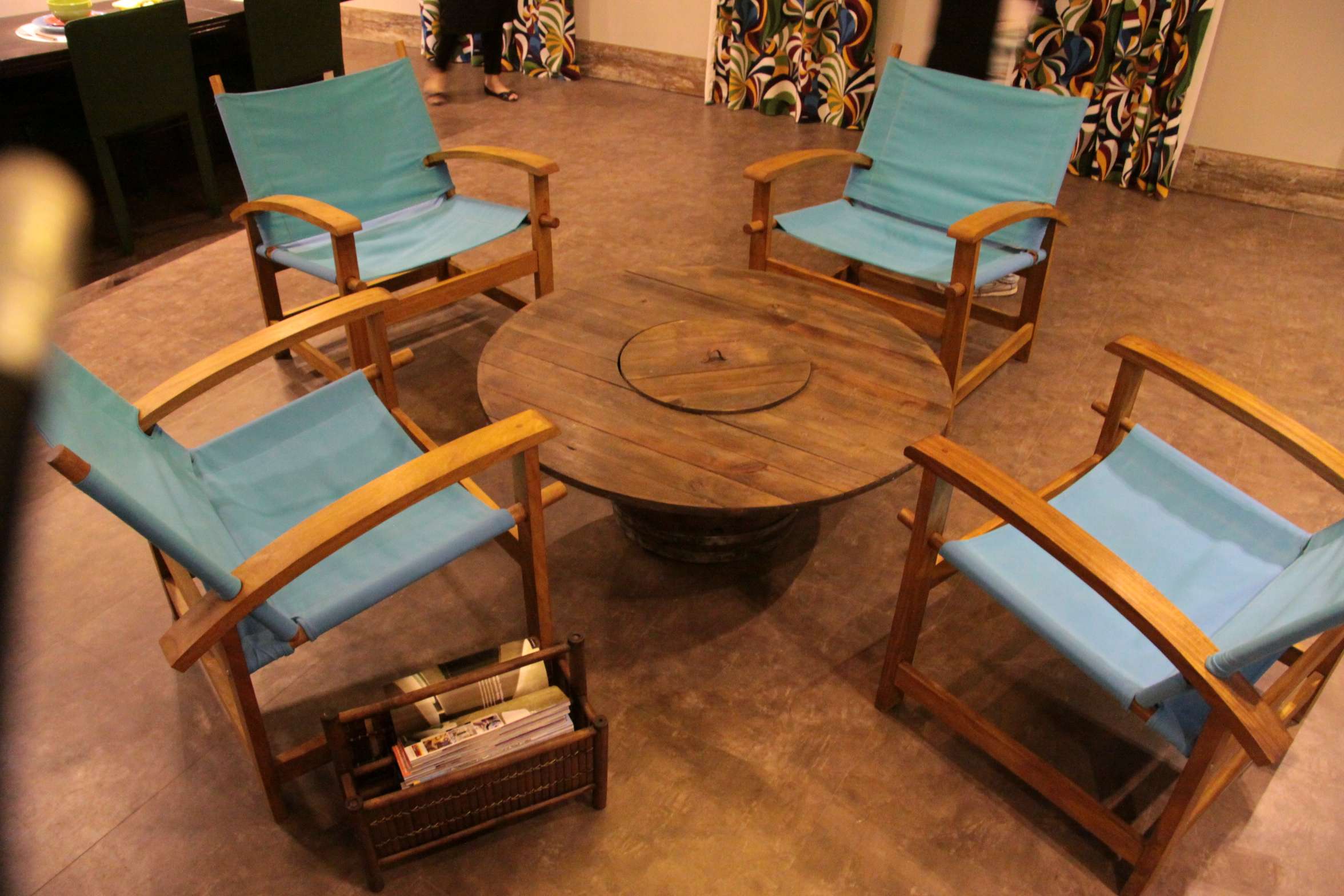
An electric wire reel reused as a center table in a Rio de Janeiro decoration fair. When consumers choose and reuse environmentally friendly material like this, they are practicing ethical consumerism.

In Unequal Freedoms: The Global Market As An Ethical System (1998), John McMurtry argues that all purchasing decisions imply some moral choice, and that there is no purchasing that is not ultimately moral in nature. This mirrors older arguments, especially by the Anabaptists (e.g. Mennonites, Amish), that one must accept all personal moral and spiritual liability for all harms done at any distance in space or time to anyone by one's own choices. Some interpretations of the book of Genesis from the Judeo-Christian scriptures appear to direct followers towards practising good stewardship of the Earth, under an obligation to a God who is believed to have created the planet for people to share with other creatures. A similar argument presented from a secular humanist point of view is that it is simply better for human beings to acknowledge that the planet supports life only because of a delicate balance of many different factors.

=== Spending as morality ===
Some trust criteria, e.g. creditworthiness or implied warranty, are considered to be part of any purchasing or sourcing decision. However, these terms refer to broader systems of guidance that would, ideally, cause any purchasing decision to disqualify offered products or services based on non-price criteria that affect the moral rather than the functional liabilities of the entire production process. Paul Hawken, a proponent of natural capitalism, refers to "comprehensive outcomes" of production services as opposed to the "culminative outcomes" of using the product of such services. Often, moral criteria are part of a shift away from commodity markets towards a service economy where all activities, from growing to harvesting to processing to delivery, are considered part of the value chain for which consumers are "responsible".

Andrew Wilson, Director of the UK's Ashridge Centre for Business and Society, argues that "Shopping is more important than voting", and that the disposition of money is the most basic role we play in any system of economics. Some theorists believe that it is the clearest way that we express our actual moral choices: if we say we care about something but continue to buy in a way that has a high probability of risk of harm or destruction to that thing, we don't really care about it; we are practicing a form of simple hypocrisy. Ethical consumerism is widely explained by psychologists using the theory of planned behavior, which attributes a consumer's choices to their perceived sense of control, social norms, and evaluation of the consequences. A 2025 meta-analysis further supported this theory, using it as a foundational theoretical framework in the study to identify past experiences, perceived consumer effectiveness, attitudes, subjective norms, and environmental consciousness as significant predictors of sustainable product consumption. However, recent research suggests that a consumer's ethical obligation, self-identity, and virtues may also influence their buying decisions.

In an effort by churches to advocate moral and ethical consumerism, many have become involved in the Fair Trade movement:

- Ten Thousand Villages is affiliated with the Mennonite Central Committee
- SERRV International is partnered with Catholic Relief Services and Lutheran World Relief
- Village Markets of Africa sells Fair Trade gifts from the Lutheran Church in Kenya
- Catholic Relief Services has its own Fair Trade mission in CRS Fair Trade

== Standards and labels ==
A number of standards, labels and marks have been introduced for ethical consumers, such as:

- B corporation
- Co-op Marque
- Dolphin safe
- EKOenergy for electricity agreements
- Equal Exchange
- Ethical Consumer Best Buy label
- Fairtrade
- Free-range poultry
- FSC-certified sustainably sourced wood
- Grass fed beef
- Green America Seal of Approval
- Halal (religious standard)
- Kosher (religious standard)
- Local food
- MSC-certified sustainably sourced seafood
- No Pork No Lard (semi-religious standard)
- Organic food
- Organic Trade Association
- Product Red
- Rainforest Alliance certified
- Recycled/recyclable
- Respects Your Freedom
- Shade-grown coffee
- Social Accountability 8000
- Union-made
- Vegan

Along with disclosure of ingredients, some mandatory labelling of the origins of clothing or food is required in all developed nations. This practice has been extended in some developing nations so that, for example, every item carries the name, phone number and fax number of the factory where it was made so a buyer can inspect its conditions. This can also be used to show that the item was not made by child labour or "prison labor", the use of which to produce export goods is banned in most developed nations. Such labels have also been used for boycotts, as when the merchandise mark Made in Germany was introduced in 1887.

These labels serve as tokens of some reliable validation process, some instructional capital, much as does a brand name or a nation's flag. They also signal some social capital, or trust, in some community of auditors that must follow those instructions to validate those labels.

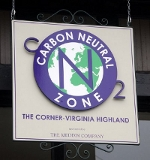
A sign proclaiming carbon neutrality in the Virginia-Highland neighborhood of Atlanta.

Some companies in the United States, though currently not required to reduce their carbon footprint, are doing so voluntarily by changing their energy use practices, as well as by directly funding (through carbon offsets), businesses that are already sustainable—or that are developing or improving green technologies for the future.

In 2009, Atlanta's Virginia-Highland neighborhood became the first Carbon-Neutral Zone in the United States. Seventeen merchants in Virginia-Highland allowed their carbon footprint to be audited. Now, they are partnered with the Valley Wood Carbon Sequestration Project—thousands of acres of forest in rural Georgia—through the Chicago Climate Exchange (CCX). The businesses involved in the partnership display the Verus Carbon Neutral seal in each store front and posted a sign prominently declaring the area's Carbon Neutral status. (CCX ceased trading carbon credits at the end of 2010 due to inactivity in the U.S. carbon markets, although carbon exchanges were intended to still be facilitated.)

Some theorists suggest the amount of social capital or trust invested in nation-states (or "flags") will continue to decrease, and that placed in corporations (or "brands") will increase. This can only be offset by retrenched national sovereignty to reinforce shared national standards in tax, trade, and tariff laws, and by placing the trust in civil society in such "moral labels". These arguments have been a major focus of the anti-globalization movement, which includes many broader arguments against the amoral nature of markets. However, the economic school of Public Choice Theory pioneered by James M. Buchanan has offered counter-arguments based on an economic demonstration of this theory of "amoral markets", which lack ethics or morals, versus "moral governments", which are tied to ideas of justice.

== Research ==
GfK NOP, the market research group, made a five-country study of consumer beliefs about the ethics of large companies. The countries surveyed were Germany, the United States, Britain, France, and Spain. More than half of respondents in Germany and the US believed there is a serious deterioration in standards of corporate practice. Almost half of those surveyed in Britain, France, and Spain held similar beliefs.

About a third of respondents told researchers they would pay higher prices for ethical brands, though the perception of various companies' ethical or unethical status varied considerably from country to country.

The most ethically perceived brands were The Co-op (in the UK), Coca-Cola (in the US), Danone (in France), Adidas (in Germany), and Nestlé (in Spain). Coca-Cola, Danone, Adidas, and Nestlé did not appear anywhere in the UK's list of 15 most ethical companies. Nike appeared in the lists of the other four countries but not in the UK's list. A 2024 study using survey data collected in 2014 from 34 countries found that social capital and cultural capital were positively associated with ethical consumerism in both emerging and developed markets. Additionally, the researchers found that national affluence influenced these relationships, with cultural capital becoming a stronger predictor of ethical consumerism as country-level affluence increased.

In the UK, The Co-operative Bank has produced an Ethical Consumerism Report (formerly the Ethical Purchasing Index) since 2001. The report measures the market size and growth of a basket of 'ethical' products and services, and valued UK ethical consumerism at GBP36.0 billion (~USD54.4 billion) in 2008, and GBP47.2 billion (USD72.5 billion) in 2012.

A number of organizations provide research-based evaluations of the behavior of companies around the world, assessing them along ethical dimensions such as human rights, the environment, animal welfare, and politics. Green America is a not-for-profit membership organization founded in 1982 that provides the Green American Seal of Approval and produces a "Responsible Shopper" guide to "alert consumers and investors to problems with companies that they may shop with or invest in." The Ethical Consumer Research Association is a not-for-profit workers' co-operative founded in the UK in 1988 to "provide information on the companies behind the brand names and to promote the ethical use of consumer power." They provide an online searchable database under the name Corporate Critic or Ethiscore. The Ethiscore is a weightable numerical rating designed as a quick guide to the ethical status of companies, or brands in a particular area, and is linked to a more detailed ethical assessment. "Alonovo" is an online shopping portal that provides similar weightable ethical ratings termed the "Corporate Social Behavior Index".

== Related concepts ==
=== Conscientious consumption ===
Conscientious consumerism is when people make a habit of buying goods from ethical companies and avoid impulsive buying from unethical ones, in order to contribute positively in political, social, and environmental ways. Such a consumer rationalizes unnecessary and even unwanted consumption by saying that "it's for a good cause." As a result, the consumer buys pink ribbons during National Breast Cancer Awareness Month, green products to support the environment, candy and popcorn from school children, greeting cards and gift wrap from charities, and other such often-unwanted objects. The consumer avoids considering whether the price offered is fair, whether a small cash donation would be more effective with far less work, or even whether selling the item is consistent with the ostensible mission, such as when sports teams sell candy.

Some of these efforts are based on concept brands: the consumer is buying an association with women's health or environmental concerns as much as they are buying a tangible product.

Conscientious consumption involves people who are "more focused on real needs than artificially created craves," such as not continually following trend cycles in consumer industries.

Conscientious consumerism has become more popular in recent years, with consumers becoming more aware of the impact of their purchases on society and the environment. This trend has led to the growth of companies that prioritize corporate social responsibility and ethical practices in their operations to reinforce customer loyalty. However, some companies have taken note of this shift towards conscientious consumerism and started deceptive marketing to convey a false impression that their product is environmentally friendly. This green marketing tactic is called greenwashing, which is prevalent in the cosmetic industry. Greenwashing has a negative impact on consumer trust in brands and cosmetic products that are marketed as green.

=== Alternative giving ===
In response to an increasing demand for ethical consumerism surrounding gift-giving occasions, charities have promoted an alternative gift market, in which charitable contributions are made on behalf of the gift "recipient". The "recipient" receives a card explaining the selected gift, while the actual gift item (frequently agricultural supplies or domestic animals) is sent to a family in a poor community.

== Criticism ==
Critics argue that ethical consumerism has limited ability to affect structural change. Berkey (2021) has argued that ethical consumerism focuses on individual consumer behavior rather than systemic change and can create a false sense of efficacy and distract from more effective methods of creating change, such as collective action and policy reform. Timothy M. Devinney, Pat Auger and Giana M. Eckhardt say the actual effect of ethical consumerism is the preponderance of niche markets, while McCombs researcher Julie Irwin argues that because it is difficult for consumers to obtain enough information about the outcomes of a given purchase, this prevents them from making informed ethical choices.

One study suggests that "Buying Green" serves as a license for unethical behavior. In their 2009 paper, "Do Green Products Make Us Better People?", Nina Mazar and Chen-Bo Zhong write:

In line with the halo associated with green consumerism, people act more altruistically after mere exposure to green than conventional products. However, people act less altruistically and are more likely to cheat and steal after purchasing green products as opposed to conventional products. Together, the studies show that consumption is more tightly connected to our social and ethical behaviors in directions and domains other than previously thought.

In a 2010 The Guardian article, British environmental writer and activist George Monbiot argued that green consumers who do not articulate their values are part of "a catastrophic mistake," on the grounds that such consumerism "strengthens extrinsic values" (those that "concern status and self-advancement"), thereby "making future campaigns less likely to succeed".

James G Carrier, Associate at the Max Planck Institute for Social Anthropology, draws on Karl Marx's concept of commodity fetishism to argue that ethical consumption does not help consumers lead a more moral life, nor does it influence businesses as intended. The goal of ethical consumption at a personal level is to lead a more moral life, and that capitalism causes commodities to be presented in such a way that they are perceived without regard for the labor that is represented by the product, the labor that was involved in allowing that commodity to exist.

The goal at a public level is for consumers to use their purchasing power to put pressure on companies to change the way they conduct business. Marx argued that under capitalism, the presentation of goods obscures the people and processes behind their production. Carrier begins by giving examples of products that have been presented in a way that misrepresents their context. He first points to the images of growers commonly found on fair trade coffee packaging. The image suggests self-reliance and ignores the dependence upon immigrant wage workers who harvest the coffee. Fairtrade coffee is viewed as a direct link to the grower without a middleman. However, there are many parties involved such as the roasters, shippers, wholesalers, and retailers of the product. Carrier also discusses fictitious commodities, which are things that are not produced in the conventional sense, material or not, and can be appropriated for commercial gain. The conceptual categories of ethicality need to be legible to consumers in order for a consumer to be able to participate in ethical consumption.

Sellers use imagery to satisfy that need, and the images they use become emblematic and representational of the values of ethical consumers, and in some ways, the presentation of these images fetishize the product, and the pervasiveness of such images begins to shape ethicality, as the absence of these images also signifies the absence of those same values. In short, it is difficult to buy ethical products because there are many aspects to commodities that consumers are unable to be fully aware of; fully informed decisions are almost impossible to make. Consumers see the images that sellers use as a means of virtue signaling, and purchase those products with the intent of ethical consumption because they believe that those images have been produced conscientiously to represent conceptual categories of "ethical." This difficulty is amplified when companies engage in practices such as greenwashing, where ethical claims are exaggerated or misleading. Greenwashing can intensify the challenge of informed ethical consumption by creating "green confusion", making it difficult for consumers to distinguish genuinely sustainable products from superficially ethical ones.

A 2024 study identifies six key features of greenwashing: the company makes an environmental claim about a product or service, the claim is not supported by evidence, it is intended to mislead consumers, it gives the company an advantage, it is linked to a specific product or service, and it is communicated through marking or advertising. This demonstrates how even well-intentioned consumers face challenges in making truly informed, ethical choices.

Carrier extends commodity fetishism to include nature reserves because they are advertised and because people are urged to visit the landscapes and animals for a fee. For example, parks in Jamaica show colorful fish and coral growth on pamphlets to attract tourists. These photos fetishize coastal waters by ignoring the other important ecological aspects of the water. In Montego Bay, Jamaica, environmentalists argue that tourism has damaged the park. Run-off feeds into the waterways and sea-grass beds integral to local nutrient cycles are removed.

The strategic direction of the consumer's attention further mystifies and fetishizes the object of consumption. Carrier points out that the moment of consumer choice is emphasized rather than the context that leads people to seek ethicality. He believes that more attention should be paid to how the consumer acquired their moral leanings.

== See also ==
- Anti-consumerism
- Cause marketing
- Charity shop
- Circular economy
- Circular fashion
- Consumerism
- Critical consumerism
- Cultured meat
- Degrowth
- Double-duty dollar
- Ecologism
- Ethical banking
- Ethical eating
- Ethical investing
- FIRE movement
- Fair trade
- Frugality
- Green brands
- Intentional living
- Leon Sullivan § Selective Patronage Movement
- Organic food culture
- Socially responsible investing
- Sustainable business
- Sustainable fashion
- Sustainable living
- Textile recycling
- Veganism
- Vegetarianism
- Zero-waste fashion
