= Green America =

US non-profit organization

Green America (known as Co-op America until January 1, 2009) is a nonprofit membership organization based in the United States that promotes environmentally aware, ethical consumerism. It was founded in 1982 by Paul Freundlich to help consumers find environmentally compliant companies in the marketplace. Green America provides businesses with the Green America Seal of Approval, after completing Green America's screening process and have been approved to be listed in their National Green Pages directory. The Green America Approved seal is given to applicant businesses that operate in ways that support workers, communities, and protect the environment.

== History ==
Co-op America (now Green America) had its roots in the environmental and social justice movements of the '70s. Founder Paul Freundlich thought that there was a significant segment of Americans who had been changed by the culture of recent decades, yet had not found a way to express that in their lives. Some regional businesses had grown out of similar values, yet lacked access to a customer base sufficient for growth. Co-op America began as a collaborative marketplace, speaking to the shared interests of consumers and business, by a staff and an elected governance structure. Co-op America published a quarterly journal, Building Economic Alternatives, and a catalog of goods and services.

Co-op America received support from Consumers United's President, James P. Gibbons. The Co-op Catalog was developed and supervised by Denise Hamler, who joined the staff in 1982, and has continued to manage major programs including National Green Pages and Green Festivals. In 2016, Denise Hamler retired from Green America after 34 years.

Alisa Gravitz became a consultant in 1983 and in 1990 succeeded Paul Freundlich as executive director. Paul remained on the board of directors as founder and president emeritus.

== Programs ==
Green America has programs to promote environmental preservation and improve human rights in food, finance, labor, social justice, and climate. In 2019, these were some of the programs were available:

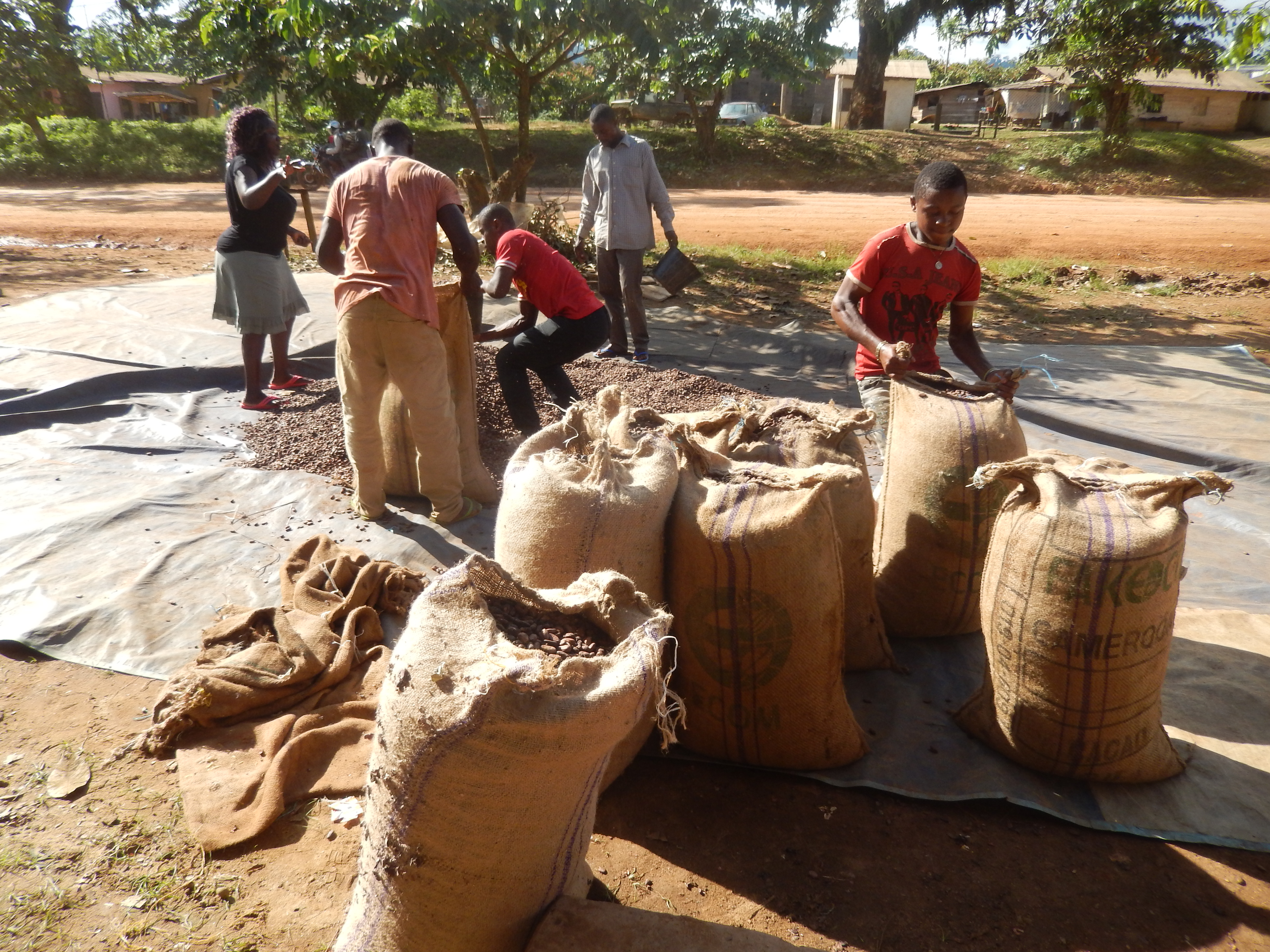
Cocoa season in Cameroon

- The true cost of two-day shipping is a program exposing the poor conditions in the warehouses that pack and ship for Amazon.
- The immigrants who feed the country, exposing the low wages and poor working conditions of workers who harvest food crops in the US.
- Raise the Bar, Hershey is a campaign to urge the Hershey chocolate company to go fair trade, as well as adopt more transparent sourcing policies.

Green America is part of Voice, a watchdog coalition for a reformed cocoa industry. Godiva chocolates and child labor is one focus. Global Exchange and International Labor Rights Forum are also part of the program.

== Publications ==
Green America publishes the National Green Pages, a nationwide directory of screened, socially, and environmental responsible businesses in the United States. It is intended to connect consumers with green products from green businesses.

Your Green Life is an annual publication that is a guide for consumers who wish to make responsible choices when purchasing goods or services.
