= Girlgov =

Civic engagement program for girls in Pennsylvania, United States

GirlGov is a civic engagement program run by the Women and Girls Foundation, a non-profit organization in Pennsylvania, United States. Every year, around 100 girls travel to the State capitol building of Pennsylvania in Harrisburg. There, these girls have the chance to shadow and lobby their state representatives. The goal for the girls is to increase civic engagement and the goal for the state is to increase political representation among women and decrease the gender disparity within the state House of Representatives and the Senate. Since its start GirlGov has served over 500 girls.

== History ==
In 2005, the Women and Girls Foundation launched a program in conjunction with FISA Foundation, Eden Hall Foundation, and the Jewish Women’s Foundation called Girls as Grantmakers. In this program, around two dozen girls from across Allegheny County. These girls were of different race, ages, types of schools, geographic locations, and economic levels. The 2-year program took place from 2005-2007. The girls granted up to $10,000 to different organizations and groups aimed at increasing the quality of a girl within the county. Before the end of their term, these girls launched a campaign against Abercrombie & Fitch. They encouraged girl nationwide to boycott Abercrombie & Fitch for shirts containing racist and sexist imagery and themes in their 2005 Girlcott. This Girlcott successfully joined the efforts of girls across the country to pressure Abercrombie & Fitch to pull 2 of its shirts. Though the company did not take down all the shirts that the girls wanted, the experience and the coalition building inspired them to create another county based group under the title Regional Change Agents. The Allegheny County Regional Change Agents came up with the idea for GirlGov. At that time Pennsylvania was ranked low in terms of representation of women and girls in politics. GirlGov served 60 girls in 2009, its first year. This number has since increased.

== Trip to Capitol ==
The trip to Harrisburg has ranged from three days to a week. Because of the overarching goal of the program, increased political engagement among girls, the program is more than simply a day of shadowing and a trip back home. The girls do follow State Senators, Representatives, and their staff around for a day, experiencing the day in the life in the capitol, but the trip includes additional programming. In previous iterations of the trip, girls have taken part in a Mock Congress. In this Mock Congress, the girls would be split into separate committees directly mirroring committees within the state government. Each committee would read a series of proposals from real organizations in the southwestern part of the state. The Mock Congress would be allocated a set number of funds, one year this amount was $10,000, then debate until they came to a consensus about which organizations should receive the money and how much money they should hope to receive. Before doing this, they get a crash course in legislation 101. They learn of all the stops a bill takes on its path to becoming a law: committee in the Senate, community support, the House floor, etc. The girls are heavily prepared to encounter law officials. This preparation also takes the form of self care. The girls take part in activities that strengthen the bonds between each other and those that have gone before them into the male dominated world. Panels and dinners provide opportunities for the girls to encounter women in leadership positions in all fields. The girls network. In actuality, the trip more perfectly resembles a conference.

== Advocacy Work ==
Returning participants have the option to shadow a representative again or lobby. These girls would either lobby for a bill of their own choosing or lobby a bill agreed upon by the entire body of GirlGov goers. GirlGov girls have advocated for passage of the Demi Brae Bill which would introduce teen dating violence protection and education legislation. A GirlGov participant, Sarah Pesi, created her own bill. Pesi's bill was aimed at loosening the requirements to obtain restraining orders to include, minors, non-familial or romantic relationships, and varied forms of harassment. With assistance from GirlGov, Pesi oversaw and participated in the editing, networking, and lobbying of her own bill. The bill was signed into law by the acting governor of the time, Tom Corbett, in 2014.

In 2016, the girls held a rally at the Capitol to demand comprehensive science-based sexual education in schools. The GirlGov participants organized the first International Day of the Girl Celebration in 2013. Those that participate in the summer have the opportunity to continue their involvement during the year. In the WGF newsletter, girls are seen helping at rallies, volunteering in the offices of local officials, heading efforts to lower school bus emissions, raising awareness on the conflict in Syria, advocating for LGBT+ rights, and attending a luncheon at the White House, among other things. A few of the girls make up the GirlGov leadership council which organizes initiatives and leads activities on the trips to Harrisburg.

== Noteworthy Alumni ==
Sarah Pesi drafted a bill to fortify anti-stalker laws.

Julia Johnson is a local activist for the #BlackLivesMatter movement in Pittsburgh.
