= Critical consumerism =

Practice of choosing products based on ethical & political considerations

Critical consumption is the conscious choice to buy or not buy a product because of ethical and political beliefs. The critical consumer considers characteristics of the product and its realization, such as environmental sustainability and respect of worker's rights. Critical consumers take responsibility for the environmental, social, and political effects of their choices. The critical consumer sympathizes with certain social movement goals and contributes towards them by modifying their consumption behavior.

Analysis of critical consumption uses different terms to refer to boycotting and boycotting actions. These include ethical consumption and political consumerism, and sustainable consumption, which is more linked with policy.

Often consumer and citizen are considered as different because consumers only show self-interest, whereas citizens denote expanded self-interest. The general idea is that, consumers buy what they want—or what they have been persuaded to want—within the limits of what they can get. Citizenship, on the other hand, carries duties or responsibilities along with various rights. Since consumers are seen also as citizens they have to behave in a community-oriented, moral and political way, rather than as a self-interested one.

== Political use of consumption ==
One variety of critical consumption is the political use of consumption: consumers' choice of "producers" and products with the aim of changing ethically or politically objectionable institutional or market practices. Such choices depend on different factors, such as non-economic issues that concern personal and family well-being, and issues of fairness, justice, ethical or political assessment. Forms and tools of political use of consumption are boycotting and "buycotting" (anti-boycotting), and also culture jamming or adbusting.

Political consumerism is a form of political engagement, especially for young generations. In addition, market-based political strategies of young citizens go beyond boycotting and “buycotting”; they also participate in internet campaigns, becoming active consumers. Their individual choices become political movements able to challenge political and economic powers. As a political actor, the consumer "is seen as directly responsible not only for him or herself but also for the world". The phenomenon of political consumerism takes into account social transformations like globalization, the ever-increasing role of the market, and individualization.

Studies from the UK, Germany, Italy, France, North America, and Scandinavia argued that consumers are becoming increasingly politicized according to boycott and buycott principles. In particular, Scandinavian people seems to be more committed to political consumerism; for example Sweden had increased average of boycotting from 15 percent in 1987 to 29 percent in 1997.

== Historical background ==
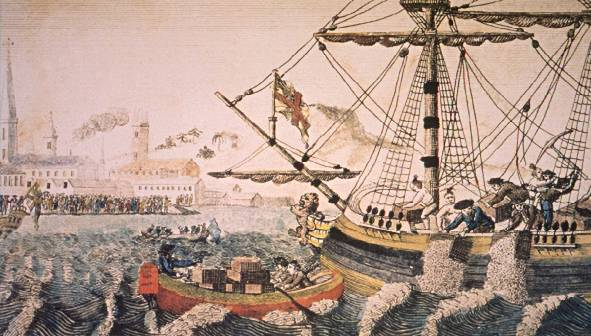
The Boston Tea Party was an important example of boycotting against England

The pursuit of fair consumption has deep roots in consumption history. During the American Revolution, sympathizers of the American cause refused to buy English goods, to support the colonists' rebellion. This act of conscious choice is an early example of both critical and political consumption. Traces of these two concepts can be found at the turn of the nineteenth century in the United States, where the National Consumer League promoted the so-called "Whitelists", in which companies that treated their employees fairly were listed.

At the end of the century, early forms of political activism in consumption took place in the United States and Europe, like the “Don't Buy Jewish” boycotts. Organizations were established that asked consumers to join the consumption-related actions as active subjects.

A variety of discourses about the "duty" and "responsibilities" of social actors arose after the 1999 World Trade Organization protests in Seattle. People were told that to shop is to vote.

== Boycotting and buycotting ==
Boycotting and "buycotting" (anti-boycotting) are expressions of an individual’s political, ethical, or environmental stance. Both boycotting and buycotting are acts of critical consumption and they are mutually contingent. In fact, if the use-value or utility of a product is important, then it is difficult to view them as separate actions.

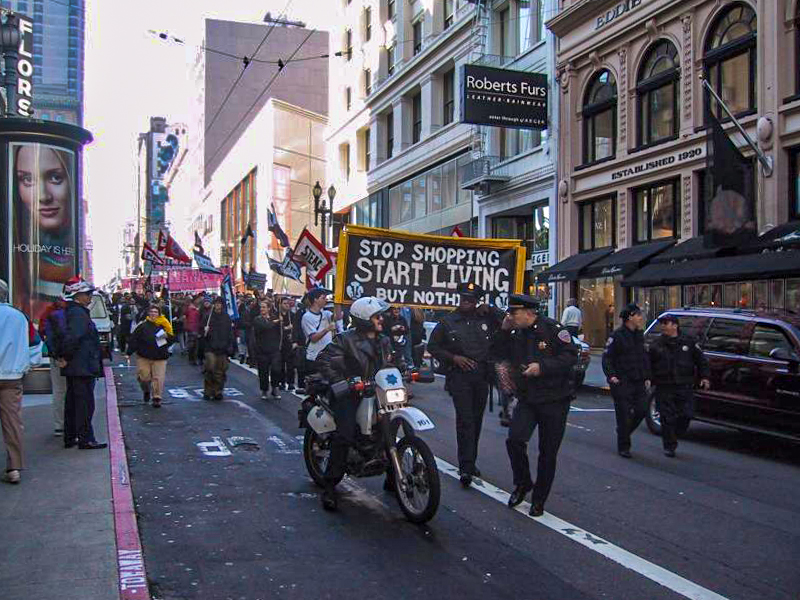
Buy Nothing Day (BND) demonstration in San Francisco, November 2000

Boycotting refers to abstaining from buying—avoiding specific products or brands to punish companies for undesirable policies or business practices. Buycotting is a term coined by Friedman (1996); it refers to “positive buying” that aims to foster corporations that represent values – such as fair trade, environmentalism, or sustainable development – that consumers choose to support.

When someone boycotts a product or service, this does not mean that he abstains from consuming at all, but that he may select an alternative product or service. Equally, a choice to "buycott" could be understood as including a rejection or boycott of the non-ethical alternative. This interdependence explains the pairing of boycotting and buycotting in much analysis of consumer politics.

A rising type of boycotting is the ad hoc variety. Such initiatives show that critical consumption is really impacting in special occasions, gaining much more visibility than everyday boycotts. An example of this type of event is the Buy Nothing Day (BND).

== Sustainability ==
The notion of sustainability has both a temporal dimension demonstrated by the trade-off between present and future generations, and a justice dimension which considers the different distribution of harm and benefit. Under the term sustainability, notions of sustainable resource consumption by recycling, environmental protection, animal welfare, social justice, and climate responsibilities are gathered.

== Criticism ==
Among the criticisms of critical consumerism are these:

- “A ‘paradox of sustainability’ arises because more substantive approaches to sustainability may be too complex to effectively motivate appropriate social responses. Moreover, all human food consumption has some kind of impact—hence there will always be some kind of prioritization”.

=== Criticism related to political use of consumption ===
- The idea that every person can be a potential political consumer is not true: ethical products can cost much more than traditional ones and people may not be able to afford such expensive products (e.g. organic products).
- People often buy products to express themselves. People who don’t care about ethical consumption will keep on buying products they like, not depending on political consumption.
- Even though single individuals make decisions and choices, political consumption can also be seen as a mass phenomenon. Consumers depend on their social environment. Consumption is determined by the specific social class the consumer belongs to, which determines their habits and what they like.

== Examples ==
These are some examples of critical consumerism:

- The Montgomery bus boycott was a political and social protest campaign against the policy of racial segregation on the public transit system of Montgomery, Alabama. The campaign started on December 5,1995 when Rosa Parks, an African American woman, was arrested for refusing to surrender her seat to a white person. After that episode, boycotters organized a system of carpools, with car owners volunteering their vehicles or themselves driving people to various destinations.
- A boycott took place against Nestlé (1977–84) because of its marketing campaign of breast milk substitute or infant formula in the Third World. This boycott mobilized consumers on a global scale and brought Nestlé to the World Health Organization and United Nations International Children Emergency Fund (UNICEF) negotiating table. In 1981, the International Code of Marketing of Breastmilk Substitutes was adopted. However, political consumerist groups were not satisfied with the Code implementation and reinstated the boycott in 1988.
- Nike Inc. has been accused for many years of exploiting child labour to produce footwear and apparel, though the company has denied such charges. The brand has been highly damaged by both political consumption activism and the publicity this has received in the media. Watchdog groups have forced Nike to raise wage levels, to change its sourcing of soccer balls to avoid child labor, to raise the minimum age of its factory workers abroad, and to insist that all outsourced footwear suppliers adopt US occupational safety and health standards for indoor air quality.
- There are also several examples of culture consumption association. One of the best known is the “No Sweat" movement, a non-profit organization that fights for the protection of sweatshop labourers, and fights against child labour, forced overtime, poverty wages, unsafe conditions, harassment of women workers, and intimidation of trade unionists, not only in developing countries, but also in Britain and the United States.

== See also ==
- Nike sweatshops
- Ethical consumerism
- Consumerism
- Boycotting
- Anti-Boycott
- Adbusting
- Culture jamming
- Sustainability
- Guilt-Free Consumption
- Organic food culture
