= Women and Girls Foundation =

The Women and Girls Foundation (WGF) is an independent, community-based non-profit organization serving 11 counties in the southwestern part of Pennsylvania. It was founded in 2002. The stated goal of the foundation is to achieve equality for women and girls in Southwestern Pennsylvania. It works toward this goal through a combined use of advocacy, coalition building, and grantmaking that specifically engages women in their own political representation and empowerment. In WGF's understanding of women's empowerment, economic upliftment is just as imperative as political empowerment. Through ensuring women have access to better working conditions and wages, it hopes to enable women to care for themselves as well as their families. Additionally, WGF does not only campaign for women-conscious policies, it facilitates the training of women and girls into leaders through initiatives and programming, such as GirlGov and Crossroads.

== History ==
Based in Pittsburgh, Pennsylvania, WGF was established as an independent 501(c)(3) in 2002 by women for women. In the late 1990s, a group of women invited women leaders to discuss and encourage them in philanthropy directed at issues that affected them. From there the idea of WGF was planted and grew. By 2002, this group of women and others came together to create the Women and Girls Foundation, an organization aimed at impacting change through public policy. The founders were Catherine Raphael, Hilda Fu, Patricia Ulbrich, Cecile Springer, Judith A. Ruszkowski, and Susan Chersky. In 2004, it elected its first Chief Executive Officer, Heather Arnet.

== Programs ==
WGF offers a series of programs for women and girls at different points in their lives. The Crossroads Conference and the GirlGov program are its most robust programs. WGF has made headlines for bringing girls to shadow their state legislators with their GirlGov program. GirlGov was created by a group of youth in WGF's Regional Change Agents. This program allows girls to travel to the state capitol and shadow and/or lobby with their state representatives. The girls have the opportunity to learn how to advocate for themselves first hand. A GirlGov participant, Sarah Pesi, created a bill to modify and fortify anti-stalker laws through the support of WGF and GirlGov. The bill would allow restraining orders to protect minors from harassment from those who did not fall under relative or partner relationships. The Crossroads Conference meets women where they are, offering support for women facing various crossroads in their lives. Women at the conference discuss difficulties such as losing a job to having another child. It is described: "Speakers will tell their personal stories and how they have navigated their life’s crossroads in high-energy, fast-paced sessions followed by more intimate salon conversations with topic experts and other attendees who may be facing the same 'crossroads.'"

== Campaigns ==
Past and ongoing WGF campaigns include:

- Grantmaking to other advocacy groups. It has invested $1 million over the years.
- Girlcott against Abercrombie&Fitch through it Girls as Grantmakers program which resulted in A&F pulling two of its problematic shirts.
- Efforts to make the shackling of female prisoners during childbirth illegal throughout the state of Pennsylvania. This state bill was supported alongside New Voices Pittsburgh, Lydia's Place, and the ACLU.
- Engaged in the Workers Organizing Table with around 20 organizations. The coalition was headed by Pittsburgh United which was founded in 2007. It aims to obtain a $15 minimum wage, paid sick leave, and paid family leave. WGF leads the legislation and accompanying advocacy work around paid family leave specifically.
- Leading the fight against domestic violence. In 2007, WGF helped create and maintain a group of women leaders in order to advocate to the city of Pittsburgh for more public policy to decrease domestic violence. This coalition later helped pass policy for the City of Pittsburgh and Bureau of Police mandating improved processes for Domestic Violence Crimes when they involve a Police Officer. This internal domestic violence prevention policy was later extended to all City of Pittsburgh employees.
- Equal Pay seeks to close the gender wage gap. Since 2006, WGF has held Equal Pay Day Rallies at which county officials commit to taking measures toward closing the gap. In 2010, officials agreed to conduct wage disparity studies every five years. The City of Pittsburgh has instituted wage audits, as well.
- "The Female Face of Poverty" increased awareness on the impact the economic recession had on women specifically. This was launched in partnership with the Institute of Women's Policy Research.
- Women on Boards focused on increasing the number of women on corporate boards in Pittsburgh. WGF built on the work of other agencies and utilized the support of other organizations (Pennsylvanians for Fair Representation) to pass legislation requiring transparency in announcing board vacancies. Later it partnered with the Pittsburgh Post Gazette to launch its "Zero No More" campaign which referenced the 26 out of 50 companies with no women at all on their boards. Additionally WGF pushed for the Pennsylvania State Treasurer, Rob McCord, to include diversity and gender equity within guidelines for Treasury investing. Because of these efforts, by 2020 women should make up 20% of those on boards.
- Coalition-building with other Pittsburgh organizations to make Pittsburgh a CEDAW city.
- WGF is currently working with national and statewide coalitions to advance Paid Family Leave legislation. WGF is working in close partnership with Family Values @ Work and the National Partnership for Women & Families on national strategies, while working in deep collaboration with Pathways PA, the Women's Law Project, Keystone Research, Community Legal Services, the Women's Bureau of the U.S. Department of Labor and Governor Wolf's office to pass state legislation in Pennsylvania providing paid family leave to all Pennsylvania workers.
- Femisphere intends to alleviate women from poverty. As explained by the Pittsburgh Post Gazette in an interview with Arnet, "She’s named the project 'femisphere,' and she wants to create a community where women can have a one-stop shop approach to resources, whether organizations are physically under one roof or digitally connected via an app." Women will have access to the different resources necessary to strengthen their 'Femispheres.'

== Madame Presidenta: Why not the U.S? ==
The Women and Girls Foundation and Heather Arnet collaborated with ELAS, the Women's Social Investment Fund of Brazil in this project. The film explores the societal and historical factors that have led to the election of the first female president in Brazil, Dilma Rousseff, through a series interviews and dialogue with people of different socioeconomic backgrounds from Brazil. It asks why the United States has yet to elect a woman as its president. The near one-hour documentary premiered at the Carnegie Museum of Art in 2014.
