= Timothy M. Devinney =

- Born: Pittsburgh, PA USA
- Citizenship: USA, Australia, UK

Academic background
- Education: Central Catholic High School, Pittsburgh PA Carnegie Mellon University, Pittsburgh PA University of Chicago, Chicago IL
- Thesis: A General Equilibrium Analysis of the Borrower-Lender Relation: An Examination of Credit Rationing Hypotheses
- Doctoral advisors: John P. Gould, Albert Madansky, Merton Miller, Edward Lazear, Dennis Carlton, Douglas Diamond

Academic work
- School or tradition: Carnegie School, Chicago School
- Institutions: Alliance Manchester Business School (2019-) Leeds University Business School (2013-2019) University of Technology, Sydney (2009-2013) Australian Graduate School of Management (1993-2009) University of California, Los Angeles (1989-1993) Vanderbilt University (1983-1989)

Timothy M. Devinney, FBA is an Australian-American-British management scholar. He holds the position of Chair and Professor of International Business and Strategy (Emeritus) at Alliance Manchester Business School. Born in the Lawrenceville district of Pittsburgh PA, he attended Central Catholic High School and subsequently graduated from Carnegie Mellon University (with a BSc magna cum laude – Psychology and Applied Mathematics). He attended the University of Chicago and received three degrees – MA (Public Policy Studies), MBA (Economics and Statistics), PhD in Economics. His dissertation was entitled "A General Equilibrium Analysis of the Borrower-Lender Relationship: An Examination of the Credit Rationing Hypothesis". He held a variety of permanent and visiting positions at Australian Graduate School of Management (AGSM), UCLA, Vanderbilt University, University of Chicago, London Business School, Copenhagen Business School, The Humboldt University of Berlin, Trier University, Hamburg University, Hong Kong University of Science and Technology, and City University - Hong Kong.

== Area of Scientific Endeavor ==
Devinney's main areas of research are based on key ideas in psychology and economics and span Corporate Strategy, International Business, Innovation, Corporate Social Responsibility(CSR), Political Risk, and Ethical/Social Consumption. He has added to existing research by the application of new and unique methodologies, particularly with respect to the measurement of performance and the unique application of experimental methods.

== Awards & Recognitions ==
Fellow of the British Academy (FBA)

Fellow of the Academy of Management.

Forschungspries and Fellow of the Alexander von Humboldt Foundation (AvH).

Fellow of the Academy of International Business.

Fellow of the Academy of Social Sciences.

Fellow of the European Academy of International Business (EIBA).

Distinguished Member of the Australia-New Zealand Academy of Management.
