= Diamond Shamrock and Kwik Stop Boycott =

Protest organized by the Nation of Islam

Coordinates: 32°45′50.10″N 96°46′29.81″W

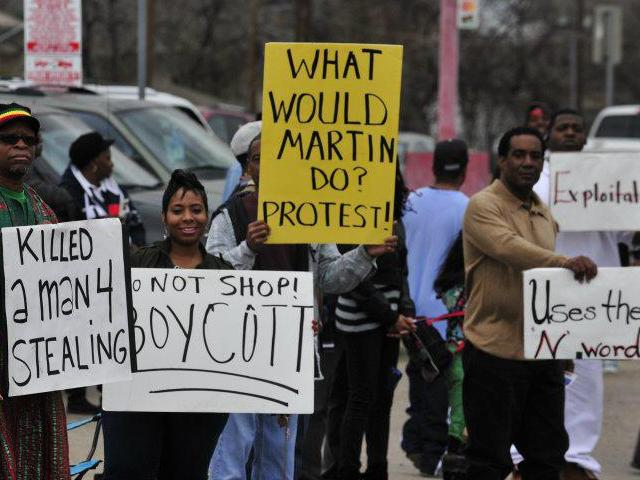
Protestors hold signs outside the Diamond Shamrock and Kwik Stop in Dallas where 26-year-old Marcus Phillips was shot and killed by a staff member.

The Diamond Shamrock and Kwik Stop Boycott was a protest organized by the Nation of Islam against the Diamond Shamrock gas station in Dallas, Texas. The gas station was located near a local mosque and liquor store, in the center of a food desert. Using the slogan Don't Stop, Don't Shop, the organization picketed the Kwik Stop convenience store located at 1909 Martin Luther King Jr. Blvd. in the first half of 2012, lasting for several months.

The protest was organized after an incident in which the Korean owner of the convenience store, Thomas Pak, refused to waive a $5 minimum charge for debit card transactions for the African-American leader of the local Nation of Islam chapter, Jeffrey Muhammad, which was allegedly followed by an exchange of racial epithets between the two men. The South Korean consul general from Houston was dispatched in an attempt to resolve the issue. In 2010, a Korean employee of the store shot and killed Marcus Phillips, a 26-year-old African-American who appeared to be attempting to steal the cash register. No arrests were made despite several eyewitness reports.

Muhammad gathered local African American community leaders following the argument to organize the boycott. Many South Dallas black leaders met to discuss the protests such as Reverend Marion Barnett and the Wright Brothers of the Justice Seekers, Peter Johnson of the Peter Johnson Foundation for Nonviolence, Curtis Wilbert of the Texas Alliance for the Formerly Incarcerated (TAFFI), among others.

Dallas has one of the largest Korean American communities in the United States, and many of them have established businesses which are central to the local black population. Many of the protesters found this relationship between the two groups to be exploitative on the Korean side. "We're saying to our own people that we need to pool our resources and then begin to open up businesses in our own community and shut their businesses down," said Muhammad. One of the major efforts by the boycotters was to find a black investor who would be willing to buy out Pak.

The protest was supported by the president of the Dallas chapter of the NAACP, Juanita Wallace. The organization itself had no involvement in the boycott, and Wallace even received backlash from her superiors for her efforts. Anthony Bond, the founder of the Irving chapter of the NAACP, has called for the protest to end and has contacted the United States Department of Justice to request assistance from a Community Relations Service representative. Bond met with Pak to discuss the situation, asking him about the argument which sparked the protest. Pak admitted to calling Muhammad the N-word and provided more detail to the story which Muhammad had told earlier. Meanwhile, the president of the Dallas NAACP chapter and Nation of Islam activists vowed to continue protesting, although they came to an end in the middle of 2012.

The Diamond Shamrock petrol station and Kwik Stop convenience store was demolished in autumn 2018 and it is currently an empty lot.
