= Ethical Consumer =

British not-for-profit publisher, research and campaign organisation

Ethical Consumer Research Association Ltd (ECRA) is a British not-for-profit publisher, research, political, and campaign organisation which publishes information on the social, ethical and environmental behaviour of companies and governments and issues around trade justice and ethical consumption. It was founded in 1989 by Rob Harrison and Jane Turner and has been publishing the bi-monthly Ethical Consumer Magazine since. Its office is in Manchester.

== History ==
Ethical Consumer was formed in Hulme, Manchester, UK, in 1989. Between 1989 and 2009 it was a worker co-operative, then in 2009 became a not-for-profit multi-stakeholder co-operative consisting of worker members and investor/subscriber members. It is an industrial and provident society. In 2012 the organisation started to collaborate with Lush, creating the Lush Prize, a £250,000 biennial fund that awards innovators working to find solutions to end animal testing.

== Company research and ratings ==
Ethical Consumer researches the social, ethical and environmental records of companies, using media reporting, NGO reports, corporate communications and primary research. They provide companies that they deem to have good ethical credentials with a best buy label.

Ethical Consumer Magazine
- Frequency: Bi-monthly
- Founder: Rob Harrison and Jane Turner
- Founded: 1989
- Company: Ethical Consumer Research Association
- Country: UK
- Based in: Manchester, England
- Language: English
- Website: www.ethicalconsumer.org
- ISSN: 0955-8608

== Consumer publishing ==
It publishes a bi-monthly print magazine, Ethical Consumer Magazine, sold via subscription, at shoppes and newsstands.

It has a consumer website which is partly subscription based, which includes:

- around 100 shopping guides with analysis of company and product ethics
- several thousand company profiles, which include company ownership structures, brands, and overall ethical scores
- UK consumer boycotts list; some of the causes it supports are more contentious, such as the BDS movement
- sections on ethical issues such as palm oil
- feature articles categorised by sector including: Energy, Fashion & Clothing, Food & Drink, Home & Garden, Health & Beauty, Money, Retailers, Technology and Transport

It also produces the annual UK Ethical Markets Report.

== Campaigning ==
Ethical Consumer runs consumer oriented campaigns, including a boycott against Amazon for its use of tax avoidance. It has also campaigned for better working conditions, on behalf of migrant agricultural workers, based in Spain.

== See also ==
- Alter-globalisation
- Anti-globalisation movement
- Business ethics
- Fair trade
- Green brands
