= Buycott.com =

Consumer boycott website and mobile app

- Buycott.com logo
- Trade name: Buycott Inc.
- Industry: Technology, social activism
- Founder: Ivan Pardo
- Key people: Maceo Martinez
- Products: Consumer advocacy software
- Website: buycott.com

Buycott.com is an Internet-based platform and smart-phone application created to read the Universal Product Codes (UPC) barcode on a product and suggest whether a consumer should buy or avoid that product based on how well it aligned with the consumer's values and principles. Consumers could join various Buycott campaigns to indicate their support or their opposition to various issues and topics. The app advised them about purchasing from corporate entities - and their affiliates - that endorse policies which conflict with those campaigns. The consumer could thus "vote with their wallet", and opt to purchase a competing product, or forgo the purchase altogether.

As of March 2023, the latest update to the app was on the 21st of October 2016. The latest social media posts on Facebook, Instagram, and Twitter were all also before the end of 2016. The latest update to the Terms and Conditions page was in December 2015.

Buycott.com was launched to encourage Corporate Social Responsibility, prior to the point of purchase, and raise awareness that consumer purchases have real-world consequences. Buycott claimed to have a database of over 150 million product UPC tags as unique product identifiers, containing all sorts of consumer products from foods to cosmetics to services such as restaurant chains and hotels. Buycott.com also queried consumer activists for scanned product information when the database was missing product descriptions or other information. Each campaign's database relevancy and success was dependent upon the membership's participation.
