= Organic food culture =

Social and cultural trend

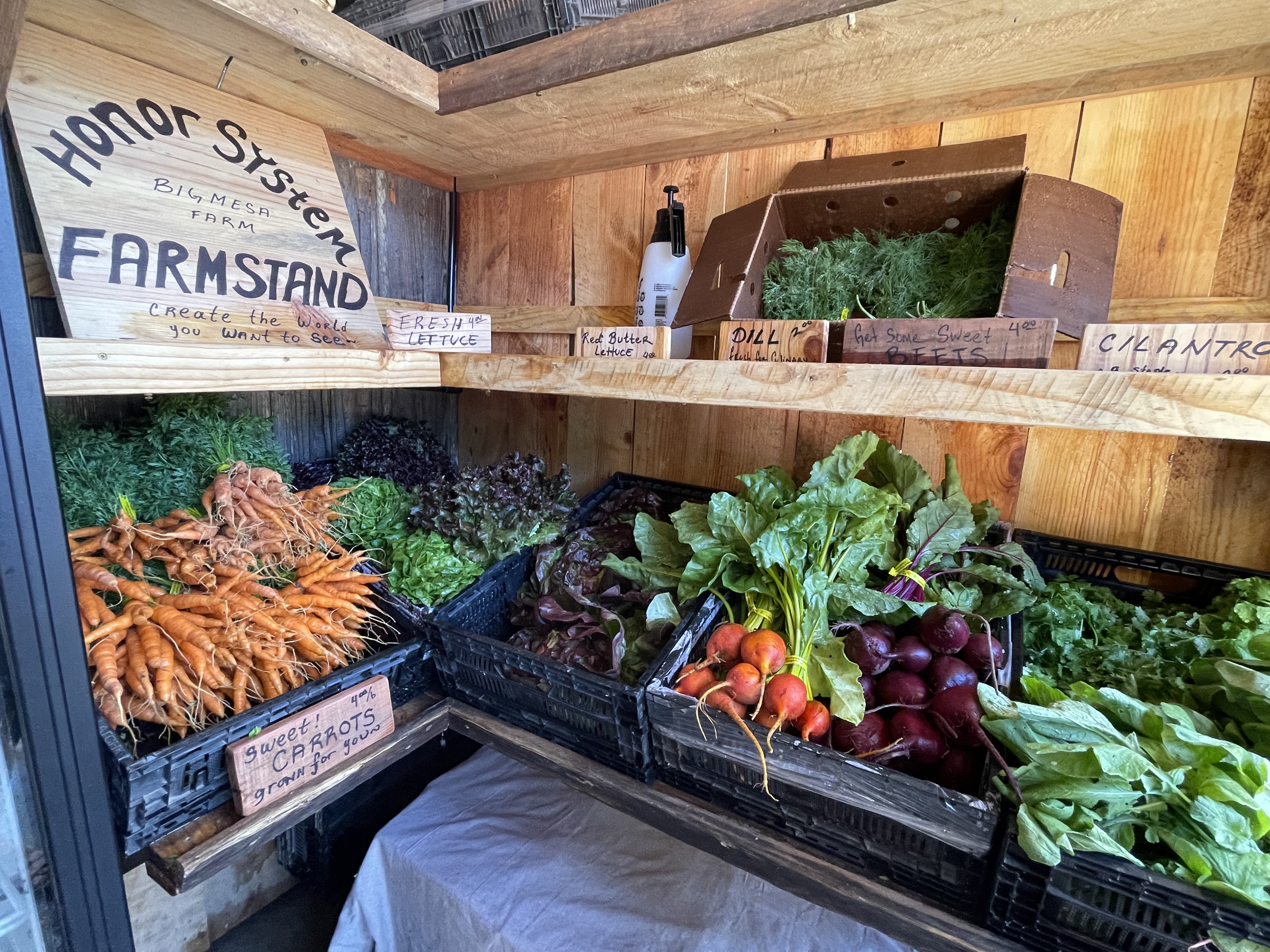
"Organic vegetables" are being advertised at Big Mesa Farmstead in Mendocino, California.

Organic food culture refers to a recent social and cultural trend in which there has been an increased interest in organic food due to the rise of media coverage on health, food safety, and environmental dangers of pesticides. This attitude considers food a central requirement for health, but it does not neglect the aesthetic or hedonistic aspects of food consumption.

This trend in the way people are eating crosses many aspects of the social and cultural realm, such as market practices and media content when it comes to food, which has led to some novelties and changes in these fields. Attitudes concerning the consumption and consideration of organic food have shifted globally, which seems to affect local food cultures and traditional gastronomies, while also incorporating them.

== Critical consumption of food ==
Consumption of organic food is a form of critical consumerism, since it stems from assumptions that are related to personal and public welfare. This practice requires a conscious consumer, who knows what they want and the reasons why they want it when it comes to food consumption. Such a vision of the consumer involves both environmental and personal responsibility.

Organic food thus implies concern with the self and the environment and works in a very personalized fashion. Moreover, it is also a means of communicating personal beliefs.

Even if consumers are consciously active, they have to be sure that the products they consume are produced according to precise criteria. This can be achieved by relying on institutional bodies, such as the United States Food and Drug Administration, which intervene in the management of organic food circulation. These groups also provide the consumer with a set of recognizable signs that convey information about the source, means of production, ingredients, and nutritional values of their food.

The USDA may still allow areas of agriculture to "fall through the cracks" because, for example, labels on milk and yogurt are under purview of the Food and Drug Administration, not the USDA. On the other side, the "FDA holds that it has no role in validating animal-raising claims" regarding ethics and standards for animal agriculture. For farmed animals, such as "when it comes to milk and the cows that produce it, anyone can claim almost anything."

== National variation and food policies ==
=== Localization practices ===
The rising popularity of organic foods also raises important questions of interest to governments of different countries. Some research also states that people have a preference for buying organic food due to the fact that they believe it is stimulating the local economy. Demographic and agricultural histories, as well as governmental procedures, are fundamental to understanding recent food system localization practices. The growing recognition of the significance of local food and agriculture has raised considerable interest in farmers and consumers attempting to challenge global food systems. Much of the emphasis in new local food policy initiatives has combined specialty products from local farms with organic and ecological products. The turn to local food may cover many different forms of agriculture, encompassing a variety of consumer motivations and giving rise to a wide range of political changes, much as the laissez-faire economics of the nineteenth century prompted various responses with resistance to contemporary globalization.

=== Food policies in Europe ===
In many European countries, food is crucially linked to a sense of belonging to a national community and is part of national identity. The debate over genetically modified food in Europe has brought interest groups, social movements, and NGOs to spread the importance of health, nutrition, and ecological consideration to legislative bodies. The European Commission created a set of policies in 2007 that regard procedures to be taken when it comes to organic agriculture and importing. Some countries in the European Union support growth in the biotechnological industry, while other countries have adopted precautionary principles to avoid industrialized food production. The Consumer Union has successfully campaigned for introduction of regulations requiring labeling of products to ensure customers have control over the purity and quality of the food they purchase. Concerns about genetically modified food have increased demand for organic food, which is seen as a way to eat only trusted foods to provide a sense of order. Since 1970 agricultural policy in EU member states has been taken over by the community; farmers and retailers have grown accustomed to thinking of food issues in political and environmental terms.

=== Local variation in Europe ===
In countries like the UK, government policies focus regulations on informed consumer choice, via ingredient labeling. The UK is the European country where the most vocal and radical resistance to new agricultural innovation can be found, due to the government's slow response to food scares. Studies proved that in countries like Belgium, Norway, and UK, there is a strong preference for ecologically cultivated food. In spite of this, the UK's government has attempted to mobilize the organic food market.

In other countries, like Italy, transparency and quality seem to have a different meaning, which implies that labeling of products plays a slightly different role. Labeling is necessary to put a greater emphasis on tracing food, which is perceived as a step toward safety. The Italian debate on GM food is very recent (late ’90s) and has grown rapidly. Food safety has become a media issue, which has encouraged consumers to prefer organic products considering the fact that 77% of Italian adults are convinced that organic food is better for them. Organic food is portrayed as safer, expressing cultural traditions and territorial awareness. Associazione Italiana per l’Agricoltura Biologica reports a growth in organic acreage, therefore, Italy is one of the leader countries of organic food production. The Italian government has a more involved approach to the organic food matter. Politicians have taken a strong stance and the government has made great efforts to mobilize value change. Organic food illustrates the combined impact of moral issues with questions of localized trust in farmers. Food is linked to issues of political legitimization, becoming an object of continuous debates and struggles between citizens and the government. Interactions between producers, retailers and consumers are originating new styles of consumption that have given power to the consumer. In European societies, marketing and retailing agents provide ecological information to their customers, leading people to begin questioning large companies and government statements about food. This represents major proof that food consumption is, among other things, crucial to people's sense of belonging to a political community.

=== Organic labels ===
EU organic food logo

In the organic food market, a consumer's trust is a crucial issue since purchasers are unable to truly verify whether a product is organic, even after consumption. Organic certification has a long tradition in many European countries. Organic certification labels on product packages and/or price tags are used as a signal to consumers that a product is a certified organic product. In the European Union, the only products that can be labeled and sold as organic food comply with and are certified according to the principles of organic production, certification and labeling of Regulation (EC) No 834/2007. Since July 2010, all prepackaged organic products produced and sold in the EU must be labeled with the new mandatory EU logo.

Besides the EU label, there are several other organic certification labels in many European countries, which are owned by different kinds of organizations. On one hand, these can be differentiated into governmental labels, and on the other hand logos of private organizations. Governmental logos are found in some but not in all European countries (e.g. Danish ‘Red Ø’ logo, German ‘Bio-Siegel’).

In the US, in order to be considered organic a product must be produced using specific methods (excluding radiation, genetic engineering, etc.), only using allowed substances, and overseen by the US Department of Agriculture, who is making sure the farm is following all organic regulations. In order to sell a product that claims to be organic, it must be certified. If there are specific ingredients in a product that are certified organic, this may be specified on the packaging. An exception to the labeling of organic products is the fact that products coming from farms that make $5,000 or less do not have to be certified.

== Markets ==
=== Production ===
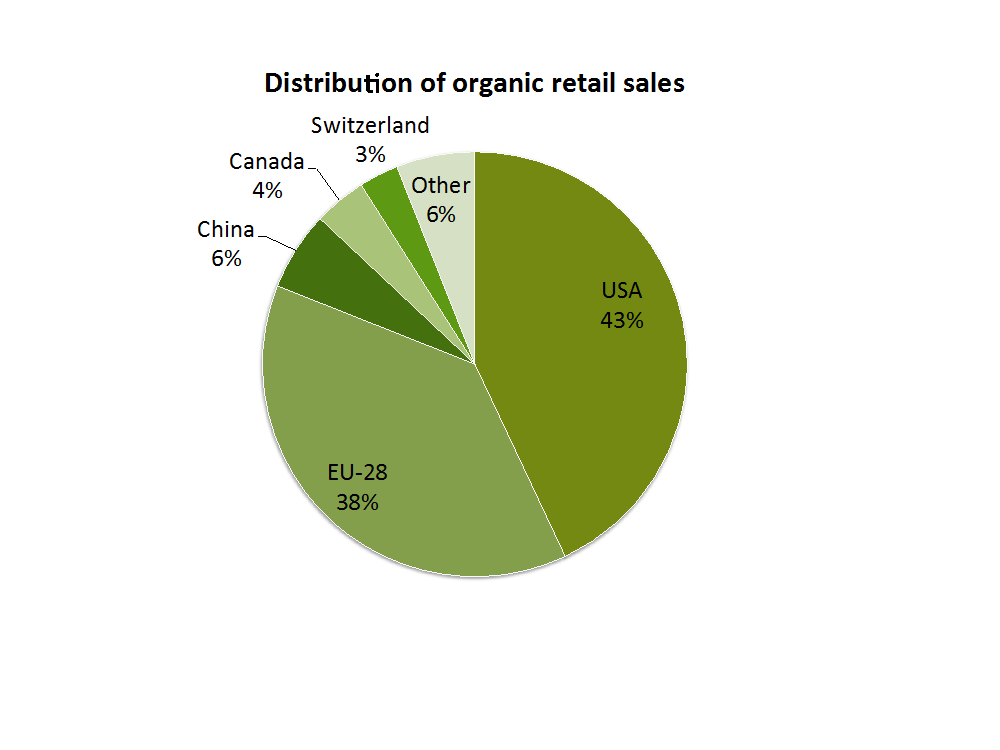
Fig. 1. Global distribution of organic retail sales by single market, 2014. (Source: FIBL-AMI survey, 2016).

The organic market in the EU increased by 7.4% in 2014, led by Germany with 7,910 million Euro retail sales and a growth rate of 4.8%, followed by France, UK and Italy. (FIBL-AMI survey 2016 based on national data sources).

Worldwide, the organic market is headed by the United States, which holds 43% of global retail sales, followed by EU (38%), China (6%), Canada (4%) and Switzerland (3%). In the United States the solid growth of organic food market is expected to continue until 2018, according to the new “United States Organic Food Market Forecast & Opportunities, 2018” (2013) that puts a compound annual growth rate of 14% on the sector.

=== Consumption ===
In the EU, consumption of organic food has almost doubled in the last decade; consumers in 2005 used to spend, on average, €22.4 per capita on organic food, while in 2014 the number is increased up to €47.4. In this case, the nation that consumes more is Switzerland, followed by Luxembourg, Denmark, and Sweden.

In the US, organic food consumption is on the rise as well. In 2014, consumption was up to about $35 billion per year and it is estimated that organic foods have become more commonplace since then. Produce is the top selling category when it comes to organic foods, but other categories such as dairy, snacks, and beverages are on the rise as well.

=== Distribution ===
While at the beginning organic products were mainly sold by specialized retailers, at the end of the 1990s sales began to cross over the mainstream retailers. Today, general retailers are the main distribution channels, followed by organic retailers and direct sales, even if these channels differ in importance from country to country. 93% of organic foods are sold in regular or specialized supermarkets in the US and the remaining 7% come from alternate buying means, such as farmers markets.

=== Retailers and marketing approaches ===
As a consequence of the fact that consumption of organic products is embedded in a wider system of beliefs, buyers are highly involved when purchasing these types of products and the activity itself involves mental and emotional processes. Thus, the marketing approach toward this type of consumption is said to be more cognitive than behavioral, since its aim is primarily to understand how consumers link a product's traits with a healthful and socially conscious lifestyle. Typically, consumers relate the taste, texture, and odor of the food to kinds of hedonistic achievements and the organic way of production is connected to a healthy lifestyle and thus wholesomeness, physical well-being, and eventually happiness and a general inner harmony.

From the retailer point of view, organic foods, together with a set of other food products such as food supplements, weight loss bars, and free-from products, make up a category of goods that attract many niche market consumers and generate high margins of revenue. Traditional supermarkets are increasingly promoting organic food products by means of wider variety, price differentiation, and private labels, and specialized organic food stores, like Whole Foods and Trader Joe's, are increasingly more popular.

Organic private labels play a particularly important role in building the retailer image, since they help to build the retailer image and consumer bindings. As a sign of corporate social responsibility, the labels influence consumer trust in the company and its products. In the case of organic products, trust plays a crucial role since, even if consumers want to act in a conscious, rational, and independent way, it can be difficult to know if what buyers see is what they get. Usually, consumers cannot directly verify whether the organic products they purchase actually follow the laws of organic agriculture. If a consumer suffers from information asymmetries, this can make them feel vulnerable. For this reason it is important for the consumers to rely on the USDA along with retailers and marketing gurus, who present themselves as guarantors that products have actually been produced according to organic farming practices.

=== Organic restaurants ===
Organic and green restaurants constitute an additional food service connected with the spread of organic sensitivity. They have recently gained popularity and exploited market segmentation in order to attract those customers who are engaged with the pursuit of a healthy diet.

In the early 1960s in Los Angeles, Gypsy Boots ran a pioneering organic restaurant and health food store called the "Health Hut", which was patronized by dozens of Hollywood celebrities.

In 1998, England's first certified organic gastropub, the Duke of Cambridge, opened in the London Borough of Islington. It is certified by the Soil Association.

In 1999, Restaurant Nora in Washington DC became the first 'Certified Organic Restaurant' in the United States with certification by Oregon Tilth. Restaurant Nora closed in 2017. Oregon Tilth also certified 'Tilth' restaurant as Washington state's first Certified Organic Restaurant, in Wallingford, Seattle. Tilth closed in 2020.

In 2005, in France, La Chassagnette an all-organic restaurant on a 500-acre farm in Arles was the first organic restaurant to receive a Michelin Star. In 2014 in France, certified organic restaurant 'Elsa' at the Monte-Carlo Beach hotel, received a Michelin Star.

Founded in 2015, 'The Organic Coup' is a US-based certified organic fast-food restaurant chain focused on chicken. At its peak, the restaurant had 13 locations. The Organic Coup temporarily closed all locations in December 2020. As of November 2025, 3 locations remain open.

Restaurants of this nature usually stock up directly from local products, offering clients dishes cooked with fresh and local ingredients. Recently, certifications have been instituted for organic restaurants. For example, in Italy, the Institute for Ethical and Environmental Certification (ICEA) has set a certification system that allows for more control and standardizes requirements in order to get organic recognition. In addition to certifications for organic foods, standardization for gluten-free, vegetarian, and vegan menus have been instituted, as well.

== Media content ==
Even if there are numerous factors influencing shopper behaviors, media plays a great role in decision making. Over 90% of consumers receive information about food and biotechnology through popular press and television. For some people, viewing something like a documentary can be so unpleasant that they change their behavior instantly. Some consumers feel intimidated by the strong visuals and communication of mass media, sometimes leading them to react by rejecting it completely, but sometimes leading to a slow change in practices and habits. If overall level of media coverage on the risks of food technology increases, it will continue to affect the people who view it. Erving Goffman and others have identified the importance of how information is “framed” in risk judgments. Frames provide meaning, and a way of thinking about life, events, and the world in general. Depending on specific frames, judgments about the risks of non organic food can be wildly different. As frames, news stories offer the public various definitions of social reality. Through frames, the media can highlight certain points of view and can marginalize others.

Organic agriculture is often portrayed in the North American media as an alternative to allegedly unsafe and environmentally damaging modern agriculture practices. This means it is usually defined by what it is not (unhealthy, unsafe, etc.) rather than what it is.

== See also ==
- Agroecology
- Eco-gastronomy
- Critical consumerism
- Natural foods
- Novel food
- Organic certification

== Bibliography ==
- Grosglik, Rafi (2021). Globalizing Organic - Nationalism, Neoliberalism, and Alternative Food in Israel. SUNY Press. ISBN 978-1-4384-8155-5.
- Bezawada, Ram; Pauwels, Koen (January 2013). "What is Special about Marketing Organic Products? How Organic Assortment, Price, and Promotions Drive Retailer Performance". Journal of Marketing. 77 (1): 31–51. doi:10.1509/jm.10.0229. hdl:10679/371. S2CID 53514845.
- Pivato, Sergio; Misani, Nicola; Tencati, Antonio (2007-12-27). "The impact of corporate social responsibility on consumer trust: the case of organic food". Business Ethics: A European Review. 17 (1): 3–12. doi:10.1111/j.1467-8608.2008.00515.x. S2CID 145013389.
- Sassatelli, Roberta (October 2015). "Consumer Culture, Sustainability and a New Vision of Consumer Sovereignty: Consumer culture, sustainability and sovereignty". Sociologia Ruralis. 55 (4): 483–496. doi:10.1111/soru.12081.
- Zanoli, Raffaele; Naspetti, Simona (September 2002). "Consumer motivations in the purchase of organic food: A means-end approach". British Food Journal. 104 (8): 643–653. doi:10.1108/00070700210425930.
- Cahill, Stacey; Morley, Katija; Powell, Douglas A. (2010-07-06). "Coverage of organic agriculture in North American newspapers: Media: linking food safety, the environment, human health and organic agriculture". British Food Journal. 112 (7): 710–722. doi:10.1108/00070701011058244.
- Meyers, Courtney; Abrams, Katie (2010-07-01). "Feeding the debate: a qualitative framing analysis of organic food news media coverage". Journal of Applied Communications. 94 (3–4): 22–37. doi:10.4148/1051-0834.1190. Gale A329731151.
- Hughner, Renée Shaw; McDonagh, Pierre; Prothero, Andrea; Shultz, Clifford J.; Stanton, Julie (March 2007). "Who are organic food consumers? A compilation and review of why people purchase organic food". Journal of Consumer Behaviour. 6 (2–3): 94–110. doi:10.1002/cb.210.
- Janssen, Meike; Hamm, Ulrich; Janssen, Meike; Hamm, Ulrich (2011). "Certification Logos in the Market for Organic Food: What are Consumers Willing to Pay for Different Logos?". doi:10.22004/ag.econ.114454.
- Sassatelli, Roberta; Scott, Alan (January 2001). "Novel food, new markets and trust regimes: responses to the erosion of consumers' confidence in Austria, Italy and the UK". European Societies. 3 (2): 213–244. doi:10.1080/146166901200543339. S2CID 154389001.
- Winter, Michael (January 2003). "Embeddedness, the new food economy and defensive localism". Journal of Rural Studies. 19 (1): 23–32. Bibcode:2003JRurS..19...23W. doi:10.1016/S0743-0167(02)00053-0.
