= National Register of Historic Places listings in Jefferson County, West Virginia =

Location of Jefferson County in West Virginia

This is a list of the National Register of Historic Places listings in Jefferson County, West Virginia.

This is intended to be a complete list of the properties and districts on the National Register of Historic Places in Jefferson County, West Virginia, United States. The locations of National Register properties and districts for which the latitude and longitude coordinates are included below, may be seen in an online map.

There are 89 properties and districts listed on the National Register in the county, 2 of which are National Historic Landmarks.

This National Park Service list is complete through NPS recent listings posted May 1, 2026.

Contents: Counties in West Virginia

Barbour - Berkeley - Boone - Braxton - Brooke - Cabell - Calhoun - Clay - Doddridge - Fayette - Gilmer - Grant - Greenbrier - Hampshire - Hancock - Hardy - Harrison - Jackson - Jefferson - Kanawha - Lewis - Lincoln - Logan - Marion - Marshall - Mason - McDowell - Mercer - Mineral - Mingo - Monongalia - Monroe - Morgan - Nicholas - Ohio - Pendleton - Pleasants - Pocahontas - Preston - Putnam - Raleigh - Randolph - Ritchie - Roane - Summers - Taylor - Tucker - Tyler - Upshur - Wayne - Webster - Wetzel - Wirt - Wood - Wyoming

== Current listings ==
	Name on the Register	Image	Date listed	Location	City or town	Description
1	Christian Allemong House	Christian Allemong House	May 2, 2003 (#03000346)	35 Hardestry Rd. 39°14′14″N 77°58′43″W	Summit Point	
2	Allstadt House and Ordinary	Allstadt House and Ordinary	April 9, 1985 (#85000767)	Junction of U.S. Route 340 and County Road 27; 39°18′59″N 77°45′20″W	Harpers Ferry	
3	Altona	Altona	November 24, 1995 (#95001322)	WV 51 west of Charles Town; 39°17′24″N 77°52′57″W	Charles Town	
4	Aspen Hill		March 13, 1980 (#80004024)	North of Charles Town on WV 9; 39°19′18″N 77°51′44″W	Charles Town	
5	B & O Railroad Potomac River Crossing	B & O Railroad Potomac River Crossing	February 14, 1978 (#78001484)	At the confluence of the Shenandoah and Potomac Rivers; 39°19′27″N 77°43′43″W	Harpers Ferry	
6	Barleywood		May 24, 2007 (#07000241)	Ambler Rd., approximately 1 mi (1.6 km) north of WV 51; 39°18′54″N 77°54′42″W	Charles Town	
7	Beall-Air	Beall-Air	August 17, 1973 (#73001914)	West of Halltown off U.S. Route 340; 39°18′55″N 77°48′44″W	Halltown	
8	Belvedere	Belvedere	January 12, 1984 (#84003588)	76 Belvedere Farm Dr. 39°17′05″N 77°50′43″W	Charles Town	
9	Beverley	Beverley	March 20, 1987 (#87000486)	U.S. Route 340; also 1 Burns Farm Rd. 39°15′03″N 77°53′34″W	Charles Town	Burns Farm represents a boundary increase of April 12, 2010
10	Blakeley	Blakeley	April 15, 1982 (#82004319)	Huyett Road; 39°15′36″N 77°54′22″W	Charles Town	
11	Boidstones Place		November 22, 1999 (#99001397)	Shepherd Grade; 39°28′11″N 77°48′06″W	Shepherdstown	
12	The Bower	The Bower	April 15, 1982 (#82004321)	County Road 1/1; 39°21′54″N 77°57′27″W	Leetown	
13	Peter Burr House	Peter Burr House	April 9, 1982 (#82004322)	Warm Springs Rd. 39°21′34″N 77°51′25″W	Shenandoah Junction	
14	Cedar Lawn	Cedar Lawn	December 4, 1974 (#74002004)	3.5 mi (5.6 km) west of Charles Town off Virginia State Route 51 and south on County Road 51/1; 39°17′06″N 77°55′22″W	Charles Town	
15	Charles Town Mining, Manufacturing, and Improvement Company Building	Charles Town Mining, Manufacturing, and Improvement Company Building	August 2, 2001 (#01000779)	312 S. Mildred St. 39°17′40″N 77°51′38″W	Ranson	
16	Claymont Court	Claymont Court	July 25, 1973 (#73001908)	Southwest of Charles Town off U.S. Route 340; 39°16′07″N 77°54′21″W	Charles Town	
17	Isaac Clymer Farm		March 26, 2025 (#100011003)	2328 Engle Molers Road; 39°22′31″N 77°46′16″W	Harpers Ferry	
18	Cold Spring	Cold Spring	August 14, 1973 (#73001917)	South of Shepherdstown on County Road 17; 39°23′48″N 77°49′05″W	Shepherdstown	
19	Cool Spring Farm	Cool Spring Farm	March 27, 2007 (#07000239)	1735 Lloyd Rd. 39°14′44″N 77°55′55″W	Charles Town	
20	Downtown Charles Town Historic District	Downtown Charles Town Historic District	March 21, 1997 (#97000263)	Roughly Washington, Liberty, and Congress Sts. from the eastern town limits to Water St. 39°17′21″N 77°51′33″W	Charles Town	
21	Duffields Depot	Duffields Depot	August 3, 2007 (#07000780)	45 Melvin Rd. 39°21′46″N 77°49′32″W	Shenandoah Junction	
22	Elmwood	Elmwood	August 17, 1973 (#73001918)	South of Shepherdstown off County Road 17; 39°23′50″N 77°48′50″W	Shepherdstown	
23	Elmwood-on-the-Opequon		March 22, 2006 (#06000165)	3898 Sulphur Springs Rd. 39°21′13″N 77°57′43″W	Kearneysville	
24	Falling Spring-Morgan's Grove	Falling Spring-Morgan's Grove	February 15, 1989 (#88002670)	WV 480; 39°25′15″N 77°48′55″W	Shepherdstown	
25	Feagans' Mill Complex		January 23, 2017 (#100000572)	28 Feagans' Mill Ln. 39°14′31″N 77°55′19″W	Charles Town	
26	Jacob Folk House		September 5, 2025 (#100012203)	484 Billmyer Mill Road; 39°26′39″N 77°50′13″W	Shepherdstown	
27	Fruit Hill		September 26, 1988 (#88001588)	Shepherd Grade; 39°26′53″N 77°49′28″W	Shepherdstown	
28	Gap View Farm	Gap View Farm	January 9, 1997 (#96001574)	WV 9, between Charles Town and Shenandoah Junction; 39°20′32″N 77°50′58″W	Charles Town	
29	Gibson-Todd House	Gibson-Todd House	September 1, 1983 (#83003238)	515 S. Samuel St. 39°17′07″N 77°51′21″W	Charles Town	
30	Glenburnie		November 29, 1988 (#88002668)	County Road 16/Ridge Rd. 39°23′27″N 77°50′42″W	Shenandoah Junction	
31	William Grubb Farm	William Grubb Farm	November 21, 1991 (#91001735)	County Road 340/2, west of its junction with U.S. Route 340; 39°14′20″N 77°54′14″W	Charles Town	
32	Nathan Haines Farm		October 14, 2022 (#100008071)	1642 & 1673 Lloyd Rd. 39°14′38″N 77°55′35″W	Charles Town	Boundary increase approved July 10, 2023.
33	Halltown Colored Free School	Halltown Colored Free School	August 25, 2004 (#04000912)	Halltown Rd., near the intersection with Tabb Ln. 39°18′44″N 77°48′06″W	Halltown	
34	Halltown Union Colored Sunday School	Halltown Union Colored Sunday School	January 12, 1984 (#84003591)	Halltown Rd. near the intersection with Tabb Ln. 39°18′34″N 77°48′11″W	Halltown	
35	Harewood	Harewood	March 14, 1973 (#73001909)	West of Charles Town off WV 51; 39°18′09″N 77°55′11″W	Charles Town	
36	Harpers Ferry Historic District	Harpers Ferry Historic District	October 15, 1979 (#79002584)	Off U.S. Route 340; 39°19′35″N 77°44′29″W	Harpers Ferry	
37	Harpers Ferry National Historical Park	Harpers Ferry National Historical Park	October 15, 1966 (#66000041)	At confluence of the Shenandoah and Potomac rivers 39°18′59″N 77°43′09″W	Harpers Ferry	Boundary increase listed May 10, 2016
38	Hazelfield	Hazelfield	December 12, 1976 (#76001938)	Off County Road 48/2; 39°22′25″N 77°51′36″W	Shenandoah Junction	
39	The Hermitage	The Hermitage	December 23, 1993 (#93001444)	Kabletown Rd. (County Road 25) north of its junction with Mt. Hammond Rd. 39°14′53″N 77°50′30″W	Charles Town	Home to R. Preston Chew
40	Hillside	Hillside	December 12, 1985 (#85003521)	Old Cave Rd. 39°15′47″N 77°52′05″W	Charles Town	
41	Hopewell		March 25, 1994 (#94000214)	Bloomery Rd. (County Road 27) northeast of Bloomery; 39°16′04″N 77°47′36″W	Charles Town	
42	Houser-Mahoney House		April 28, 2025 (#100011745)	Carter Avenue across from intersection of Timber Ln. 39°21′43″N 77°46′07″W	Bakerton vicinity	
43	Jacks-Manning Farm	Jacks-Manning Farm	January 12, 1984 (#84003594)	U.S. Route 340; 39°16′08″N 77°51′38″W	Charles Town	
44	Jefferson County Alms House		April 14, 1995 (#95000418)	West Virginia Secondary Route 15 southeast of Leetown; 39°20′07″N 77°54′30″W	Leetown	
45	Jefferson County Courthouse	Jefferson County Courthouse	July 10, 1973 (#73001910)	N. George and E. Washington Sts. 39°17′21″N 77°51′37″W	Charles Town	Designated a National Historic Landmark in 2023.
46	Lee-Longsworth House	Lee-Longsworth House	September 23, 1985 (#85002471)	1141 Washington St. 39°19′32″N 77°44′49″W	Harpers Ferry	
47	Captain William Lucas and Robert Lucas House	Captain William Lucas and Robert Lucas House	September 2, 1982 (#82004323)	Engle Molers Road; 39°24′06″N 77°46′27″W	Shepherdstown	
48	James Marshall House		September 27, 1988 (#88001596)	Shepherd Grade; 39°27′15″N 77°49′31″W	Shepherdstown	
49	Media Farm		November 10, 1994 (#93000616)	Flowing Springs Rd. (County Road 17), 2 mi (3.2 km) north of Charles Town; 39°19′46″N 77°50′32″W	Charles Town	
50	Middleway Historic District	Middleway Historic District	March 13, 1980 (#80004025)	Leetown Road; 39°18′13″N 77°58′58″W	Middleway	
51	Morgan's Grove	Morgan's Grove	March 19, 1999 (#99000286)	Roughly bounded by West Virginia Routes 230 and 480, and Morgan's Grove Rd. 39°25′04″N 77°48′45″W	Shepherdstown	
52	Morgan-Bedinger-Dandridge House	Morgan-Bedinger-Dandridge House	May 13, 1983 (#83003239)	Southwest of Shepherdstown on WV 480; 39°25′37″N 77°48′43″W	Shepherdstown	
53	New Opera House	New Opera House	November 24, 1978 (#78002798)	200-204 N. George St. 39°17′23″N 77°51′39″W	Charles Town	
54	Old Charles Town Historic District		November 2, 2000 (#00001308)	Norfolk & Western railroad line, Charles Town line, Hessey Pl., North St., U.S. Route 340, S. Charles St., Water St., and W. Washington St; 39°17′14″N 77°51′43″W	Charles Town	
55	James Osbourn Farm		April 4, 2023 (#100008820)	1901 Trough Rd. 39°25′12″N 77°47′08″W	Shepherdstown vicinity	
56	Potomac Mills	Potomac Mills	February 5, 2014 (#13001166)	River & Trough Rds. 39°25′42″N 77°46′48″W	Shepherdstown	
57	Prato Rio	Prato Rio	April 11, 1973 (#73001916)	WV 480; 39°20′49″N 77°56′12″W	Leetown	
58	Rees-Daniel Farm		March 28, 2024 (#100010180)	330 Hidden Hollow Drive; 39°19′39″N 77°59′08″W	Kearneysville vicinity	
59	Rellim Farm	Rellim Farm	December 4, 1998 (#98001467)	Leetown Rd., south of WV 9; 39°22′51″N 77°53′15″W	Kearneysville	
60	Richwood Hall	Richwood Hall	June 19, 1973 (#73001911)	About 4 mi (6.4 km) west of Charles Town off WV 51; 39°17′32″N 77°55′51″W	Charles Town	
61	Rion Hall	Rion Hall	September 20, 1982 (#82004320)	East of Charles Town off U.S. Route 340; 39°18′05″N 77°48′19″W	Charles Town	
62	Ripon Lodge		August 31, 1998 (#98001074)	Junction of U.S. Route 340 and Withers-Carve Rd. 39°13′21″N 77°54′30″W	Rippon	
63	Rock Spring	Rock Spring	January 17, 2008 (#07001416)	2000 Ridge Rd. 39°23′02″N 77°50′38″W	Shepherdstown	
64	Rockland	Rockland	February 5, 1990 (#89002316)	WV 480; 39°24′30″N 77°51′29″W	Shepherdstown	
65	The Rocks		December 3, 2020 (#100005843)	1003 Westside Ln. 39°11′09″N 77°51′11″W	Charles Town	
66	Rose Hill Farm	Rose Hill Farm	May 18, 1990 (#90000716)	Off WV 480 southeast of its junction with Warm Springs Rd. 39°23′48″N 77°51′45″W	Shepherdstown	
67	Frederick Rosenberger Farm		March 28, 2024 (#100010181)	494 Harry Shirley Road; 39°19′58″N 77°58′12″W	Kearneysville vicinity	
68	Rumsey Hall	Rumsey Hall	March 30, 1973 (#73001919)	German and Princess Sts. 39°25′57″N 77°48′13″W	Shepherdstown	
69	St. Peter's Roman Catholic Church	St. Peter's Roman Catholic Church	March 30, 1973 (#73001915)	Church St. and Jefferson Rock Trail; 39°19′28″N 77°43′53″W	Harpers Ferry	
70	Shannondale Springs		March 31, 1998 (#98000289)	Off Mission Rd., south of WV 115; 39°13′13″N 77°48′58″W	Shannondale	
71	Shepherd's Mill	Shepherd's Mill	May 6, 1971 (#71000882)	High St. 39°26′00″N 77°48′05″W	Shepherdstown	
72	Shepherdstown Historic District	Shepherdstown Historic District	August 17, 1973 (#73001920)	Bounded roughly by Mill, Rocky, Duke, and Washington Sts. 39°25′58″N 77°48′24″W	Shepherdstown	
73	South Charles Town Historic District	South Charles Town Historic District	September 16, 2009 (#09000733)	S. George, S. Mildred, S. Samuel, & S. Church Sts. 39°16′41″N 77°51′09″W	Charles Town	
74	Spring Grove		May 17, 2021 (#100006504)	2497 Smith Rd. 39°12′09″N 77°54′48″W	Charles Town vicinity	
75	Strider Farm	Strider Farm	February 1, 1988 (#87002524)	Bakerton Road; 39°20′03″N 77°45′55″W	Harpers Ferry	
76	Sunnyside Farm		March 18, 1999 (#99000285)	Leetown Rd. 39°19′53″N 77°57′31″W	Kearneysville	
77	Tackley Farm	Tackley Farm	November 4, 1994 (#94001286)	WV 9 2 mi (3.2 km) east of its junction with WV 480; 39°21′50″N 77°52′21″W	Shenandoah Junction	
78	Taylor's Meadow		April 19, 2021 (#100006390)	161 McMurran Farm Lane; 39°23′52″N 77°46′41″W	Shepherdstown	
79	Traveller's Rest	Traveller's Rest	November 15, 1972 (#72001288)	3.3 mi (5.3 km) northwest of Leetown on WV 480; 39°23′17″N 77°54′04″W	Kearneysville	
80	Van Swearingen-Shepherd House	Van Swearingen-Shepherd House	August 18, 1983 (#83003241)	North of Shepherdstown; 39°26′28″N 77°48′14″W	Shepherdstown	
81	Charles Washington House	Charles Washington House	July 2, 1973 (#73001912)	Blakely Pl. 39°16′56″N 77°51′35″W	Charles Town	
82	Weirick and Weller Waterwheel		August 30, 2022 (#100008072)	6517 Kabletown Rd. 39°15′05″N 77°50′32″W	Charles Town	
83	White House Farm	White House Farm	August 29, 1979 (#79002583)	Summit Point Road; 39°15′05″N 77°56′45″W	Summit Point	
84	Wild Goose Farm	Wild Goose Farm	April 20, 2018 (#100001902)	2935 Shepherd Grade Rd. 39°28′26″N 77°48′59″W	Shepherdstown	
85	Woodbury	Woodbury	October 9, 1974 (#74002005)	On County Road 1/4; 39°21′28″N 77°54′29″W	Leetown	
86	Woodbyrne		August 2, 2024 (#100010589)	219 Ann Lewis Road; 39°11′01″N 77°52′16″W	Charles Town	
87	Woodlawn		March 24, 2000 (#00000254)	30 Wiltshire Rd. 39°20′21″N 77°53′07″W	Kearneysville	
88	Robert Worthington House	Robert Worthington House	July 2, 1973 (#73001913)	2 mi (3.2 km) west of Charles Town off WV 51; 39°17′46″N 77°53′23″W	Charles Town	
89	York Hill	York Hill	July 26, 2006 (#06000654)	1583 Ridge Rd. 39°22′36″N 77°50′47″W	Shenandoah Junction	

== See also ==
- List of National Historic Landmarks in West Virginia
- National Register of Historic Places listings in West Virginia
