= West Virginia Route 480 =

Highway in West Virginia, United States

West Virginia Route 480

Route information
- Maintained by WVDOH
- Length: 5.64 mi (9.08 km)
- Tourist routes: Washington Heritage Trail

Major junctions
- South end: WV 115 / CR 1 in Kearneysville
- WV 45 / WV 230 in Shepherdstown
- North end: MD 34 in Shepherdstown

Location
- Country: United States
- State: West Virginia
- Counties: Jefferson

Highway system
- West Virginia State Highway System; Interstate; US; State
← I-470	→ WV 501

West Virginia Route 480 (WV 480) is a 5.64-mile-long (9.08 km) state highway in the U.S. state of West Virginia. Known for most of its length as Kearneysville Pike, the highway extends from WV 115 in Kearneysville north to the Maryland state line at the Potomac River in Shepherdstown, from where the highway continues as Maryland Route 34 (MD 34). The route is one of the main north–south highways of northern Jefferson County and passes through the campus of Shepherd University. WV 480 was originally established in the early 1920s as West Virginia Route 48. The highway was paved in the mid-1920s, which included a different routing through Shepherdstown. WV 48's present routing through the town was established in the late 1930s when the first James Rumsey Bridge was completed; that bridge was replaced with the current bridge in the mid-2000s. WV 48 was renumbered to WV 480 in the mid-1970s after U.S. Route 48 (US 48) was established in West Virginia and Maryland.

== Route description ==
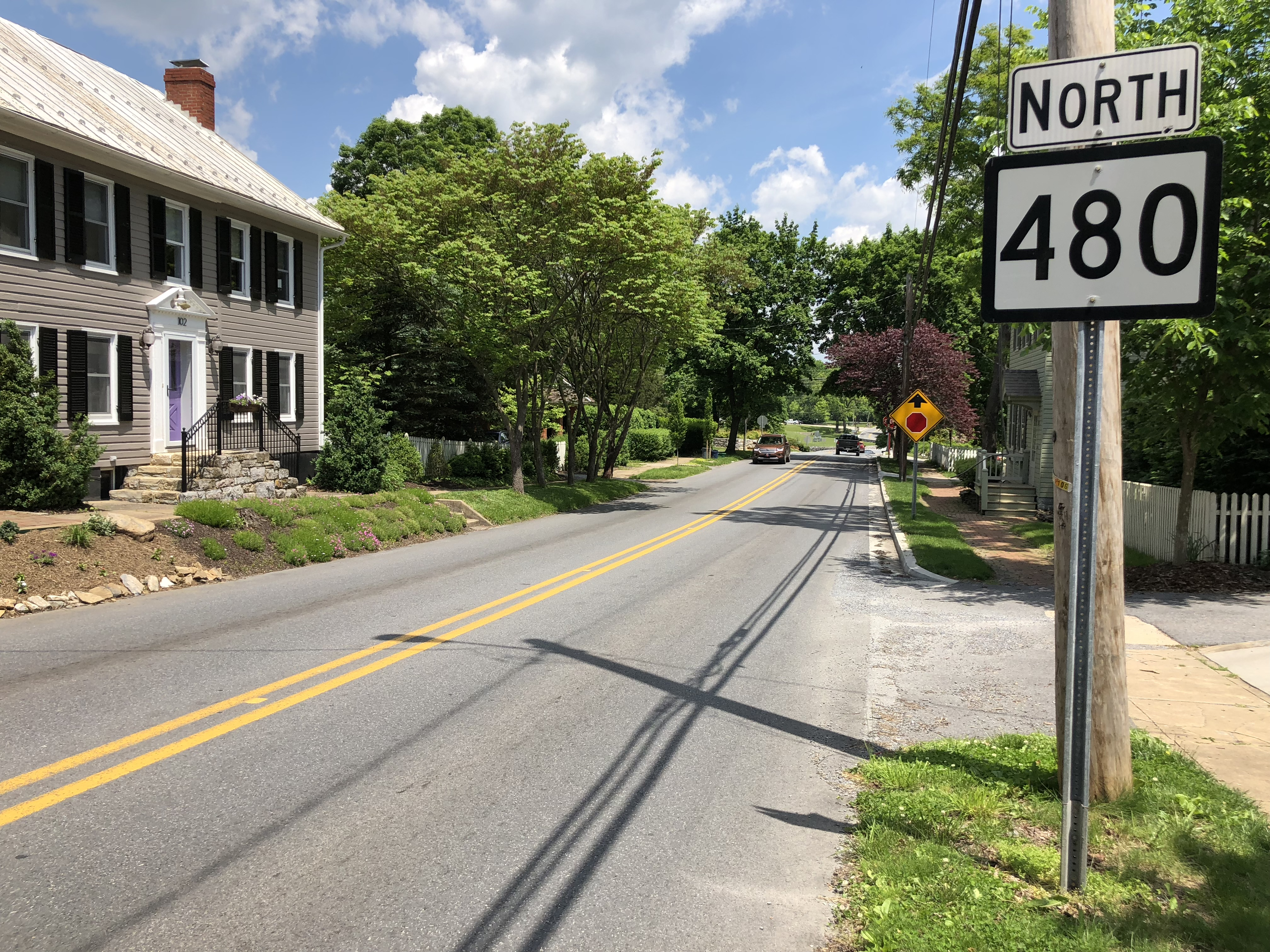
View north along WV 480 at WV 45/WV 230 in Shepherdstown

WV 480 begins at a four-legged intersection with WV 115 (Charles Town Road) in the unincorporated village of Kearneysville. The south leg of the intersection is County Route 1 (CR 1), which heads southwest along Leetown Road through its interchange with WV 9. WV 480 heads northeast along two-lane Kearneysville Pike, which passes under CSX's Cumberland Subdivision rail line. The highway passes to the west of the historic Rose Hill Farm near Walpers Cross-Roads and by the historic home Rockland near the hamlet of Mount Pleasant. WV 480 meets the southern end of WV 45 Alt. (Potomac Farms Drive) at Morgan Grove.

WV 480 bears slightly northward as it passes the Morgan-Bedinger-Dandridge House and enters the town of Shepherdstown. The highway follows Duke Street along the west side of the Shepherdstown Historic District. WV 480 intersects German Street; the intersection forms the eastern terminus of WV 45 and the northern terminus of WV 230. North of downtown, the highway bears back slightly eastward and passes through the campus of Shepherd University, including Ram Stadium. WV 480 reaches its northern terminus at the Maryland state line on the West Virginian bank of the Potomac River. The highway crosses the Potomac River on the James Rumsey Bridge and continues as MD 34 (Shepherdstown Pike) toward Sharpsburg.

== History ==
In its original 1922 state route system, the West Virginia State Road Commission established WV 48 along the Smithfield and Shepherdstown Road from WV 49 (later WV 9, now WV 115) at Kearneysville through Shepherdstown to the Potomac River. WV 48's routing was the same as modern WV 480 from Kearneysville to Shepherdstown; within the town, the route followed Duke Street, German Street, and Princess Street to the river, which the highway crossed on a bridge downstream from the current bridge. The road commission developed plans to improve WV 48 into an all-weather highway starting in 1922. The Shepherdstown routing was paved as 18-foot-wide (5.5 m) concrete streets in 1924 and 1925, and the road from the town south to Kearneysville was constructed as a 16-foot-wide (4.9 m) bituminous macadam road in 1925. The road commission and the Baltimore and Ohio Railroad started planning for the highway's railroad grade separation at Kearneysville in 1929. The railroad constructed its overpass of the highway and the road commission paved the underpass and its approaches as a 20-foot-wide (6.1 m) concrete road in 1931.

The West Virginia State Road Commission surveyed the approach road for a new Potomac River bridge in 1933; the need for the new bridge became acute after the privately owned toll bridge was destroyed in a March 1936 flood. The Maryland State Roads Commission constructed a high-level Wichert continuous truss bridge at the site of the present bridge starting in 1937. The new bridge, which had a 24-foot-wide (7.3 m) concrete road surface, opened July 15, 1939, and was dedicated to James Rumsey, an 18th-century pioneer of the steamboat, who demonstrated his invention on the Potomac River at Shepherdstown in 1787. Also in 1939, the West Virginia State Road Commission extended WV 48 north from German Street along Duke Street and a northern extension of the street to the new bridge as a 20-foot-wide (6.1 m) bituminous concrete road. The following year, the road commission widened the portion of WV 48 between the Kearneysville concrete section and the town of Shepherdstown to 20 feet (6.1 m) and resurfaced the highway with bituminous concrete. The state renumbered WV 48 as WV 480 between 1975 and 1977 after US 48 was assigned to the Morgantown–Cumberland freeway that later became part of Interstate 68. The West Virginia Department of Transportation started construction to replace the 1939 James Rumsey Bridge with a steel girder span immediately to the north of the old bridge in June 2003. The new James Rumsey Bridge opened July 15, 2005, exactly 66 years after the opening of the previous bridge, which was subsequently torn down.

== Major intersections ==
The entire route is in Jefferson County.

Location	mi	km	Destinations	Notes
Kearneysville	0.00	0.00	WV 115 (Charles Town Road) / CR 1 (Leetown Road) to WV 9 – Charles Town, Martinsburg	Southern terminus
Morgan Grove	4.32	6.95	WV 45 Alt. north (Potomac Farms Drive) – Martinsburg, truck to WV 45 / WV 230	Officially CR 245
Shepherdstown	5.19	8.35	WV 45 west / WV 230 south (German Street) – Martinsburg, Harpers Ferry	
Shepherdstown	5.64	9.08	MD 34 east (Shepherdstown Pike) – Sharpsburg	Northern terminus; Maryland state line on the James Rumsey Bridge over the Potomac River
1.000 mi = 1.609 km; 1.000 km = 0.621 mi
