= Boidstones Place =

Historic house in West Virginia, United States

- U.S. National Register of Historic Places
- U.S. Historic district
- Location within West Virginia Location within the United States
- Nearest city: Shepherdstown, West Virginia
- Coordinates: 39°28′11″N 77°48′6″W
- Built: 1766
- Architectural style: Colonial, Greek Revival
- NRHP reference No.: 99001397
- Added to NRHP: November 22, 1999

Boidstones Place, also called Greenbrakes and Fountain Rock, was built in 1766 by Thomas Boydston near Shepherdstown, West Virginia on land he was granted by Thomas Fairfax, 6th Lord Fairfax of Cameron. In a dispute with Fairfax and Joist Hite over lands he had acquired along the Terrapin Neck on the Potomac River, Boydston lost most of his lands, which were acquired by Abraham Shepherd. The property formed a portion of the Shepherd's holdings along Shepherd Grade, which were primarily devoted breeding race horses. Some of the property was annexed to the adjoining Wild Goose property, owned by R.D. Shepherd, who had a racetrack there. In 1851 R.D. Shepherd gave Boidstones to his nephew and namesake R. D. Shepherd, Jr. who built the main Greek Revival section of the house. The property was sold out of the Shepherd family in 1886, but was returned to the Shepherds in 1916 for use as a summer place.

The original house at Boidstone Place is, with the Peter Burr House, the oldest framed building in West Virginia. The 1850s Greek Revival wing is also of wood-frame construction. Another addition was made in the 1920s, in the Colonial Revival style.

Other structures on the farm include a log cabin (c. 1850), a log cottage (c. 1850s, altered in 1938), a tenant house (c. 1890), a springhouse (1850s), a garage (1920s), the main barn (c. 1850), a machine shed (c. 1910), a spray shed (c. 1920) and a bull shed (c. 1910) as well as a cemetery for slaves, active from c. 1776 to 1865.

A large spring on the property became known as Stillhouse Spring, where Boydston produced whiskey which was shipped down the river from a dock.
