= Rock Spring =

Rock Spring can refer to:

- Rock Spring, Georgia
- Rock Spring (Shepherdstown, West Virginia)
- Rock Spring (California)
