= Falling Spring-Morgan's Grove =

Historic house in West Virginia, United States

- Falling Spring--Morgan's Grove
- U.S. National Register of Historic Places
- U.S. Historic district
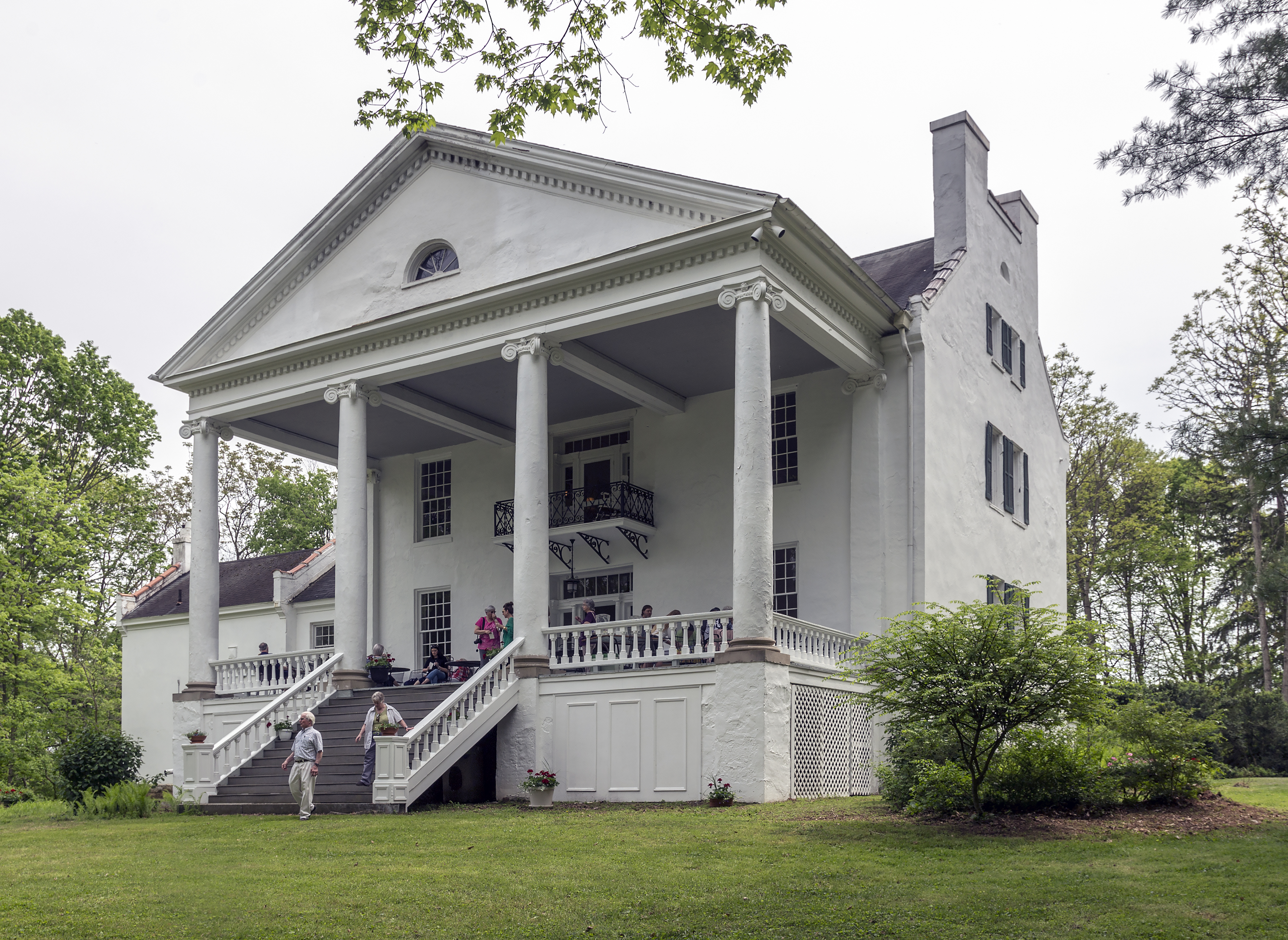
- Falling Spring in 2017

- Location within West Virginia Location within the United States
- Nearest city: Shepherdstown, West Virginia
- Coordinates: 39°25′15″N 77°48′55″W
- Built: 1734
- Architect: Edmonds, Stuart H.
- Architectural style: Classical Revival, Federal
- NRHP reference No.: 88002670
- Added to NRHP: February 15, 1989

Falling Spring at Morgan's Grove is part of a related complex of buildings and lands associated with the Morgan family and other prominent members of the Shepherdstown, West Virginia, community.

== History ==
Falling Spring was completed by 1837 as a large, house and farm complex. The property was first settled by Richard Morgan, who noted several springs on the property, including "Bubbling Spring" and "Morgan's Spring", the starting point of the 1775 Bee-Line March. The house was built by Jacob Morgan, Richard's grandson, who was a successful merchant who lived and worked in Alexandria, Virginia.

Richard's son William inherited the property in 1855. William Morgan became a Confederate officer with the start of the American Civil War, serving with Generals J.E.B. Stuart and Turner Ashby.

Falling Spring was sold in 1904 to Dr. M.H. Crawford, who added two more columns to the portico. The design may have been undertaken by Winchester, Virginia, architect Stuart H. Edmonds, who had worked at Shepherd College and Bellevue. The Crawfords also added a Japanese garden to the property.

The property and surrounding land, was granted to the Morgan family by Lord Fairfax.

== Description ==
The three-story double-pile house is three bays wide with a center hall, resting on a very high raised basement. The end walls have parapets above the roofline, incorporating prominent double chimneys on either end. The house is limestone faced with stucco. Large porticoes were added on either main elevation around 1900.
