= Feagans' Mill Complex =

- U.S. National Register of Historic Places
- Location within West Virginia Location within the United States
- Location: 28 Feagans' Mill Ln., Charles Town, West Virginia
- Coordinates: 39°14′31″N 77°55′19″W
- Area: 9.7 acres (3.9 ha)
- Built: 1795
- NRHP reference No.: 100000572
- Added to NRHP: January 23, 2017

Feagans' Mill Complex is a historic mill site at 28 Feagans' Mill Lane in Charles Town, West Virginia. The property has a documented history to 1795, and includes traces of evolutionary changes in usage over from then until its closure in 1943. The last mill building, constructed in 1940, is set on the original c. 1795 foundation. Adjacent to it are a c. 1820 miller's house enlarged about 1885, and a log smokehouse from the same time period.

The mill was listed on the National Register of Historic Places in 2017.

== See also ==
- National Register of Historic Places listings in Jefferson County, West Virginia
