= Glenburnie (West Virginia) =

Historic house in West Virginia, United States

- U.S. National Register of Historic Places
- Location within West Virginia Location within the United States
- Location: Jefferson County, West Virginia, USA
- Nearest city: Shenandoah Junction, West Virginia
- Coordinates: 39°23′27″N 77°50′42″W
- Built: 1802
- Architectural style: Federal
- NRHP reference No.: 88002668
- Added to NRHP: November 29, 1988

Glenburnie is an historic farm complex located between Shepherdstown, West Virginia and Shenandoah Junction, West Virginia. The house was built by James Glenn in 1802, completing the barn two years later.

The two-story center hall brick house has two rooms on one side of the hall, and one the full depth of the house on the other. The house is set on a rubble stone foundation. Unusually, it has north-facing windows on the gable end occupied by the large room. A 1 1/2-story kitchen was added in the 19th century. Three porches are also additions.

The stone bank barn is a major notable structure, built of the same stone rubble as the house's foundation.
