= The Rocks (Jefferson County, West Virginia) =

Historic house in West Virginia, United States

- U.S. National Register of Historic Places
- U.S. Historic district
- Location within Eastern Panhandle of West Virginia Location within West Virginia Location within the United States
- Location: 1003 Westside Lane, Charles Town, Jefferson County, West Virginia
- Nearest city: Charles Town
- Coordinates: 39°11′8.52″N 77°51′10.8″W
- Area: 79.32 acres (32.10 ha)
- Built: c. 1750 (Overseer's House); c. 1790 (The Rocks)
- Architectural style: American colonial, Georgian, Colonial Revival
- NRHP reference No.: 100005843
- Designated HD: December 3, 2020

The Rocks, also known as Raven's Rock and Raven Rocks, is a late-18th-century stone residence and 79-acre (32 ha) farm complex near Charles Town, Jefferson County, in the U.S. state of West Virginia. The Rocks is a historic district consisting of four contributing structures. The primary structure is a 2-and-a-half-story stone residence known as The Rocks, which was built around 1790, in the Georgian architectural style.

== Geography and setting ==
The Rocks and its 79-acre (32 ha) farm complex is located along Long Marsh Run near its confluence with the Shenandoah River, approximately 1.5 miles (2.4 km) from Kabletown Road in southwestern Jefferson County, West Virginia. The Rocks is located approximately 1.5 miles (2.4 km) southeast of the unincorporated community of Meyerstown, and it is situated within an area of woodlands and pasture land. It is accessible from Ann Lewis Road via Westside Lane.

== See also ==
- National Register of Historic Places listings in Jefferson County, West Virginia

== Bibliography ==
- Hitchcock, McKenzie (October 14, 2020). National Register of Historic Places Registration Form: The Rocks (PDF). United States Department of the Interior, National Park Service. Archived (PDF) from the original on January 2, 2023.
