= Fruit Hill (Shepherdstown, West Virginia) =

Historic house in West Virginia, United States

- U.S. National Register of Historic Places
- Location within West Virginia Location within the United States
- Nearest city: Shepherdstown, West Virginia
- Coordinates: 39°26′53″N 77°49′28″W
- Built: 1830
- Architectural style: Greek Revival
- NRHP reference No.: 88001588
- Added to NRHP: September 26, 1988

Fruit Hill, also known as the Robinson-Andrews-Hoxton House, is a Greek Revival house near Shepherdstown, West Virginia. The original two-story stone house on the property was probably built by Henry Cookus circa 1766. This house was built over a watercourse, assuring a reliable supply of water on what was then the frontier. The main Greek Revival house was built in the 1830s by Archibald Robinson, and the house remains in the hands of the family. The interior of the house includes a three-story open staircase.
