= West Virginia Route 230 =

State highway in West Virginia, United States

West Virginia Route 230

Route information
- Maintained by WVDOH
- Length: 9.2 mi (14.8 km)
- Tourist routes: Washington Heritage Trail

Major junctions
- South end: US 340 near Bolivar
- North end: WV 45 / WV 480 in Shepherdstown

Location
- Country: United States
- State: West Virginia
- Counties: Jefferson

Highway system
- West Virginia State Highway System; Interstate; US; State
← US 220	→ US 250

West Virginia Route 230 is a north–south state highway located entirely within Jefferson County in the U.S. state of West Virginia. The southern terminus of the route is at U.S. Route 340 west of Bolivar. The northern terminus of the route is at West Virginia Route 45 and West Virginia Route 480 in Shepherdstown.

South of CR 17, WV 230 was formerly part of County Route 23.

== Major intersections ==
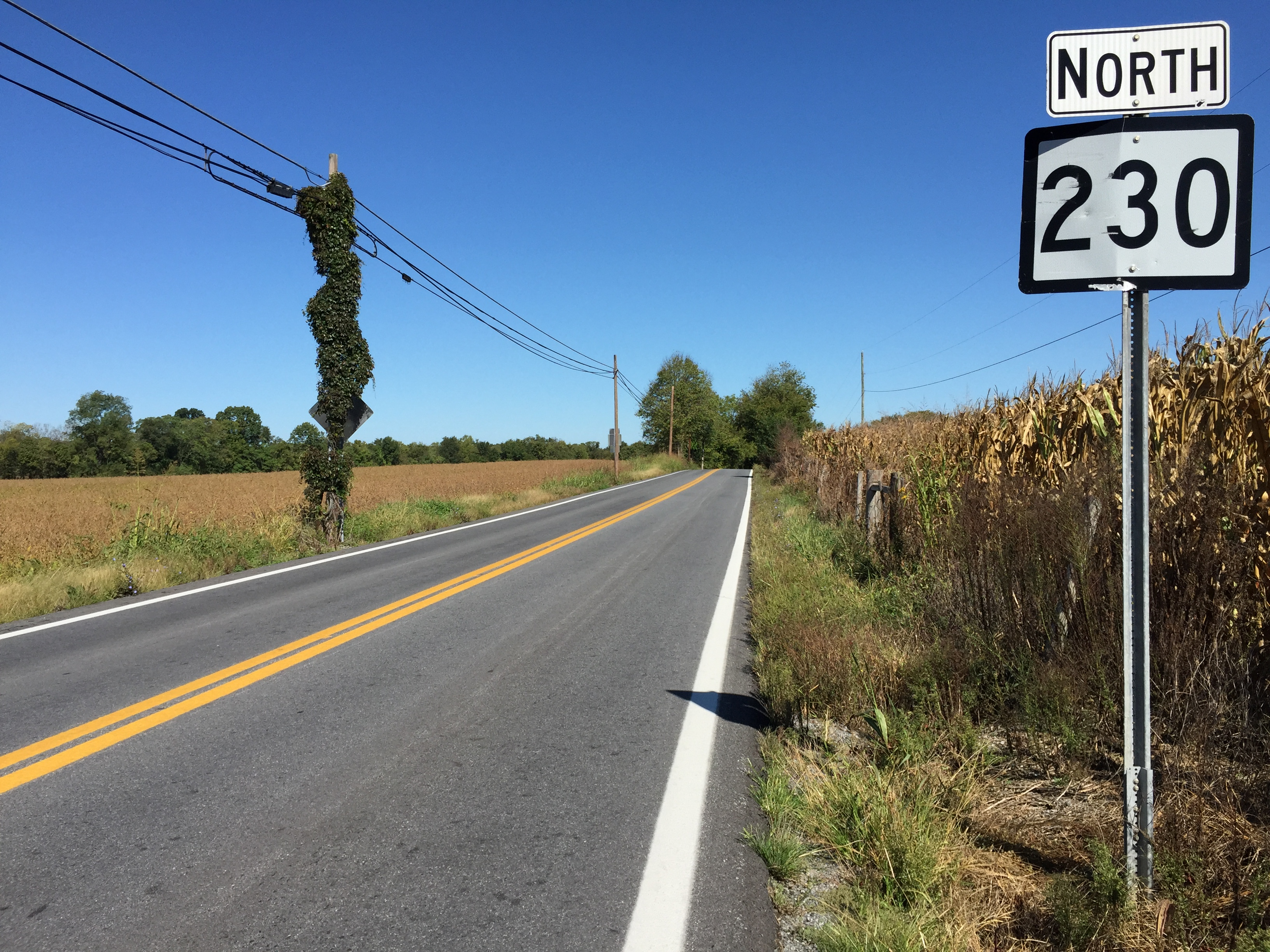
View north along WV 230 north of CR 16/1 and CR 31/1 in Jefferson County

The entire route is in Jefferson County.

Location	mi	km	Destinations	Notes
			US 340 – Harpers Ferry, Frederick, MD, Charles Town	
			CR 17 (Flowing Springs Road) – Charles Town	
Shepherdstown			WV 45 west / WV 480 – Martinsburg, Kearneysville	
1.000 mi = 1.609 km; 1.000 km = 0.621 mi
