= Captain William Lucas and Robert Lucas House =

Historic house in West Virginia, United States

- Capt. William Lucas and Robert Lucas House
- U.S. National Register of Historic Places
- Location within West Virginia Location within the United States
- Nearest city: Shepherdstown, West Virginia
- Coordinates: 39°24′6″N 77°46′27″W
- Area: 1.5 acres (0.61 ha)
- Built: 1793
- NRHP reference No.: 82004323
- Added to NRHP: September 2, 1982

The Captain William Lucas and Robert Lucas House, also known as Linden Spring, is a large stone house near Shepherdstown in Jefferson County, West Virginia, United States. It was built circa 1783 for Captain William Lucas, a Revolutionary War soldier. Lucas' son, Robert Lucas was born here and became a Governor of Ohio and the first Territorial governor of Iowa.

William Lucas was the son of Edward Lucas II, who arrived in Jefferson County in 1732 and received lands from Thomas Fairfax, 6th Lord Fairfax of Cameron. William's wife was Susannah Barnes, sister-in-law to James Rumsey, whose steamship experiments took place on the nearby Potomac River.
