= Wild Goose Farm =

Historic house in West Virginia, United States

- U.S. National Register of Historic Places
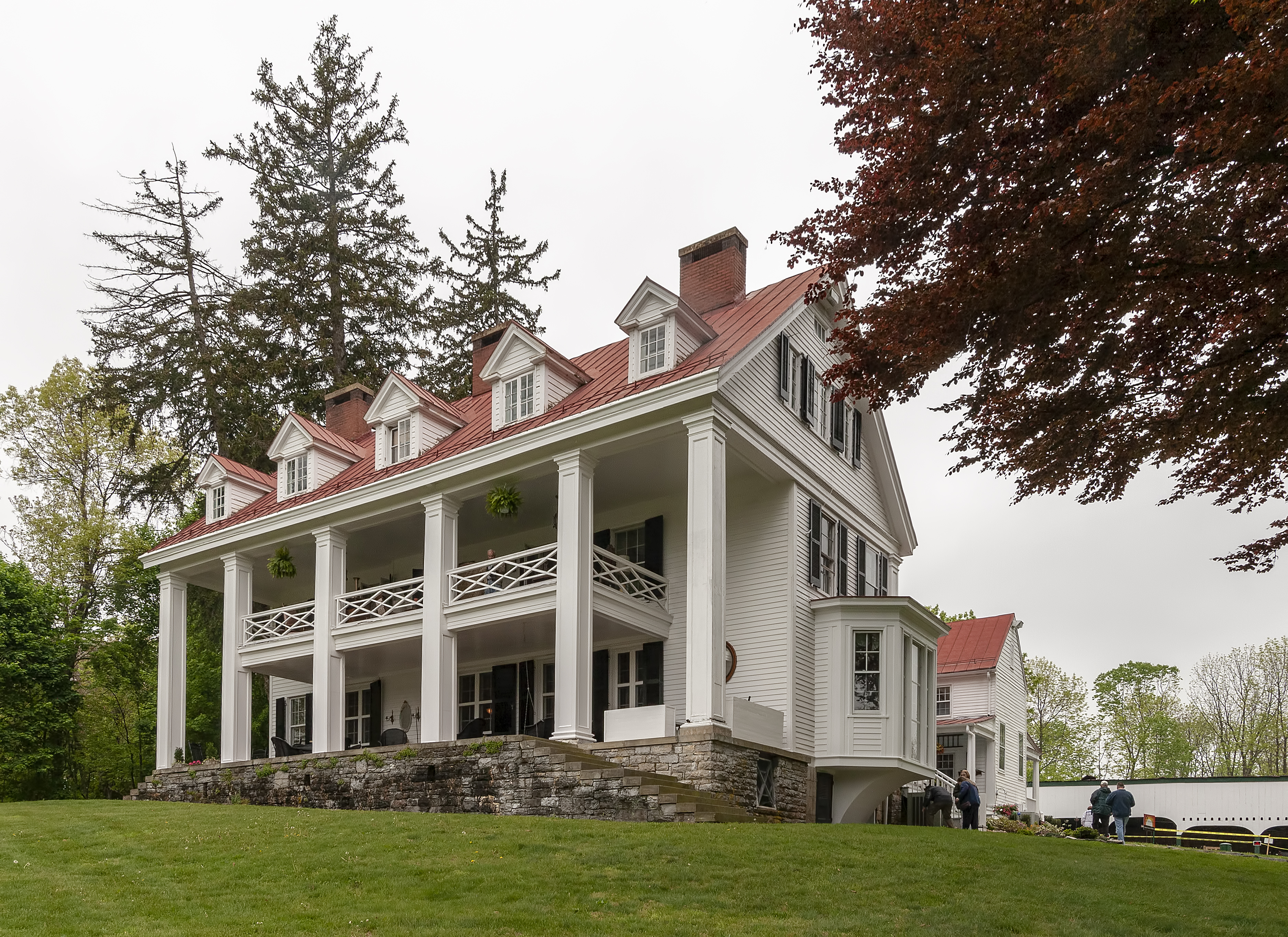
- The main house in 2010
- Nearest city: Shepherdstown, West Virginia
- Coordinates: 39°28′23.4″N 77°49′01.7″W
- NRHP reference No.: 100001902
- Added to NRHP: April 20, 2018

Wild Goose Farm is a 173-acre (70 ha) farm complex near Shepherdstown, West Virginia, established in the early 19th century. The farm includes a large, irregularly-arranged main house, a Pennsylvania-style bank barn, a tenant house, and outbuildings including a spring house, smoke house, ice house, corn crib, water tower and a decorative pavilion.

== Description ==
The complex is approached through metal gates along a tree-lined lane bordered by a stone wall. The main house has an unbalanced composition, unusual for its time, that anticipates late-19th century compositions. The wood-framed house has a two-story square-columned portico on the east elevation, with a Chippendale-styled balustrade on the second level spanning three of five bays. There are six columns and five dormers, on an ashlar-cut stone base. Three large brick chimneys project from the long roof ridge through the metal roofing material. This elevation is not the main entrance of the house, which is on the south side. A cantilevered oriel bay projects on the first level of the north side next to the east portico. The overall composition of the 9,000-square-foot (840 m^{2}) house is reminiscent of architecture in New Orleans, where Rezin Shepherd had lived. The other sides of the house have complex elevations reflecting the house's history of additions and alterations into the 20th century, all on rubble stone foundations.

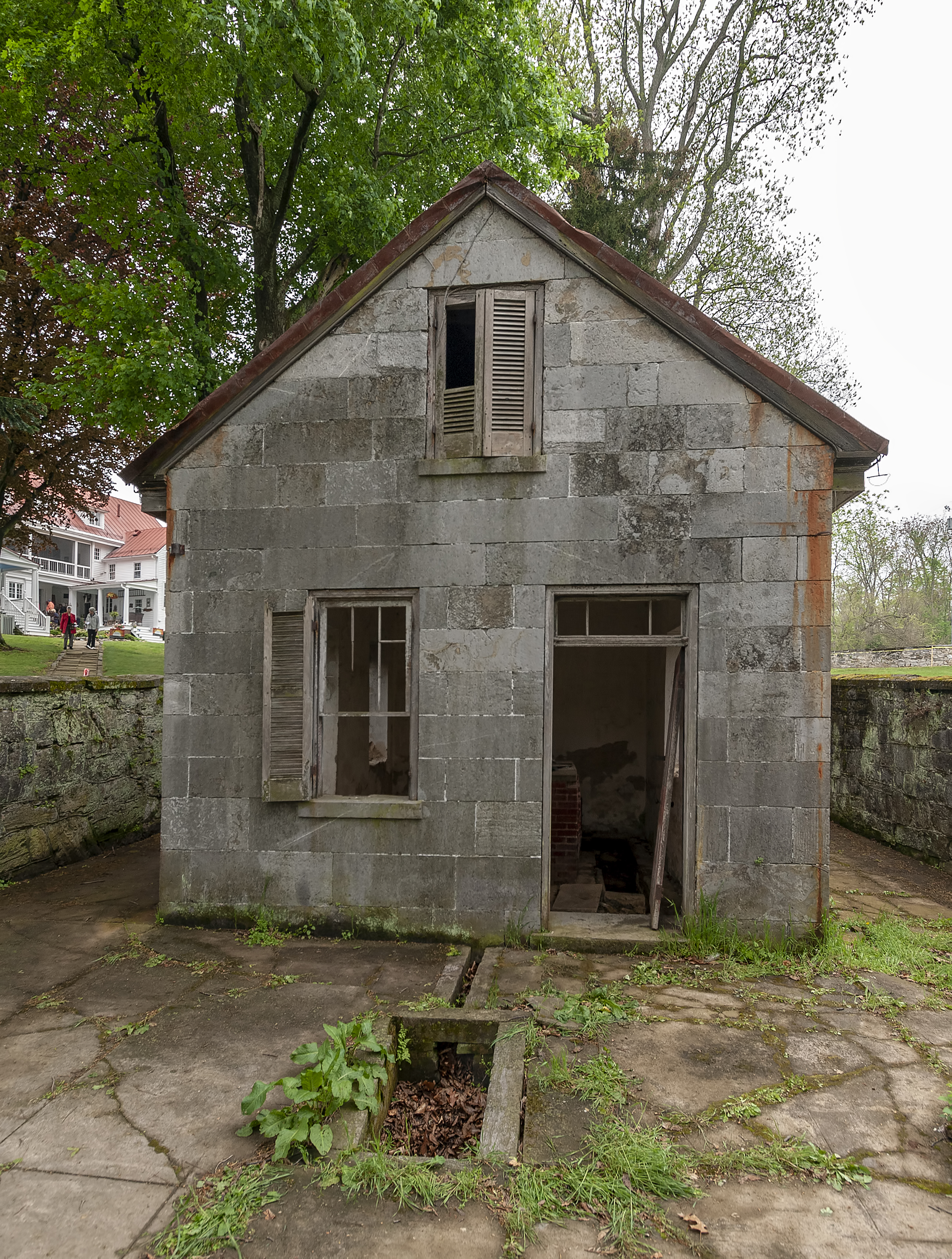
The lower side of the springhouse in 2010

The main entrance is at the east end of the south elevation, with a Greek Revival treatment opening into a reception and stair hall along the east wing, with an opening on the east side into the east wing ballroom or parlor. A dining room is on the west side of the hall, followed by a billiard room and a series of kitchen spaces. The kitchen area appears to be the oldest section of the house. The upstairs are divided into bedrooms that largely reflect the original layout of the house. The third floor was finished in the early 20th century, when the dormers were added.

The complex includes several notable outbuildings, including a springhouse in the rough form of a Greek temple. Built about 1845, the building is set into the ground, surrounded by stone retaining walls. The springhouse itself is constructed of ashlar stone masonry, with a projecting portico supported by square columns. The interior is divided into three spaces, with a channel running through for the spring water.

Other contributing buildings include a stone building (c. 1845) believed to be an office, an octagonal pagoda-like frame "sentry station" (c. 1880), believed to be a place for a timekeeper, a brick ice house (c. 1911), a stone pump house (c. 1911), a stone smokehouse (c. 1845), a six-bay carriage shed (c. 1845), and a tenant house (c. 1880).

The complex includes several agricultural buildings, including a large Pennsylvania bank barn, built between 1842 and 1845. The lowest level of the barn features unusually fine stone masonry, with a stone-arched opening leading out of the stone-walled barnyard. Other buildings include a wood-frame poultry house (c. 1880), and a frame corn crib (c. 1880). The property includes an unusual number of fitted and finished stone walls.

== History ==
The Wild Goose property was subdivided from a larger tract in the early 19th century, when John Stipp sold 121 acres (49 ha) to his son George. Passing through two more owners, the property was purchased by Van Swearingen, owner of the adjoining River View farm, in 1829. In 1838 Swearingen's heirs sold much of the land to Charles M. Shepherd. The Shepherd family, descended from Abraham Shepherd, founder of Shepherdstown, owned much of the land in the area. Rezin Davis Shepherd was the eldest son of Abraham, who had spent much of his life as a merchant in New Orleans. Henry Shepherd, the next son, operated a livestock breeding operation at Springwood near Shepherdstown, in partnership with Rezin. Youngest son Charles managed the Shepherd properties in Virginia. Rezin moved back to West Virginia in the early 1840s, having bought Charles's assets, including land, livestock and slaves. By 1846, Rezin had built a new house on the Wild Goose tract, presumed to be the present manor house. The estate reached about 700 acres (280 ha) in size by the time Rezin Shepherd entered retirement at Wild Goose, around 1850. Rezin died in 1865 at 80. Rezin's daughter Ellen (Brooks) and her two sons Peter Brooks and Shepherd Brooks inherited the property. In 1866 Shepherd bought the entire property and established it as Wild Goose Farm. In 1871 Shepherd Brooks sold the farm to Henry Shepherd, Jr. for $30,000. Henry Jr. moved to the farm in 1872.

Henry Shepherd died in 1891, deeding the farm to four sons. The three younger sons sold their shares to eldest son Rezin Davis Shepherd for $24,531, for a total property value of $38,000. The second Rezin D. Shepherd was a stage actor, using the stage name of R.D. McLean. When McLean became involved in movies in the 20th century, he sold the 185-acre (75 ha) core of Wild Goose to Edwin S. Jarrett for $36,000 in 1911.

Jarrett used the property primarily as a retreat, with a tenant farmer. During Jarrett's ownership, he added Colonial Revival features to the house and raised the roof of the east wing to furnish a third floor, adding the colonnaded porch and opening the lower level of the east wing into a single ballroom. Jarrett died in 1940, after which the property changed hands several times. It was consistently used as a country retreat by successive owners, including NASA engineer Robert Moss during the 1960s, and by West Virginia governor Gaston Caperton from 1998.

Wild Goose Farm was listed on the National Register of Historic Places on April 20, 2018.
