= Shepherdstown Historic District =

Historic district in West Virginia, United States

- U.S. National Register of Historic Places
- U.S. Historic district
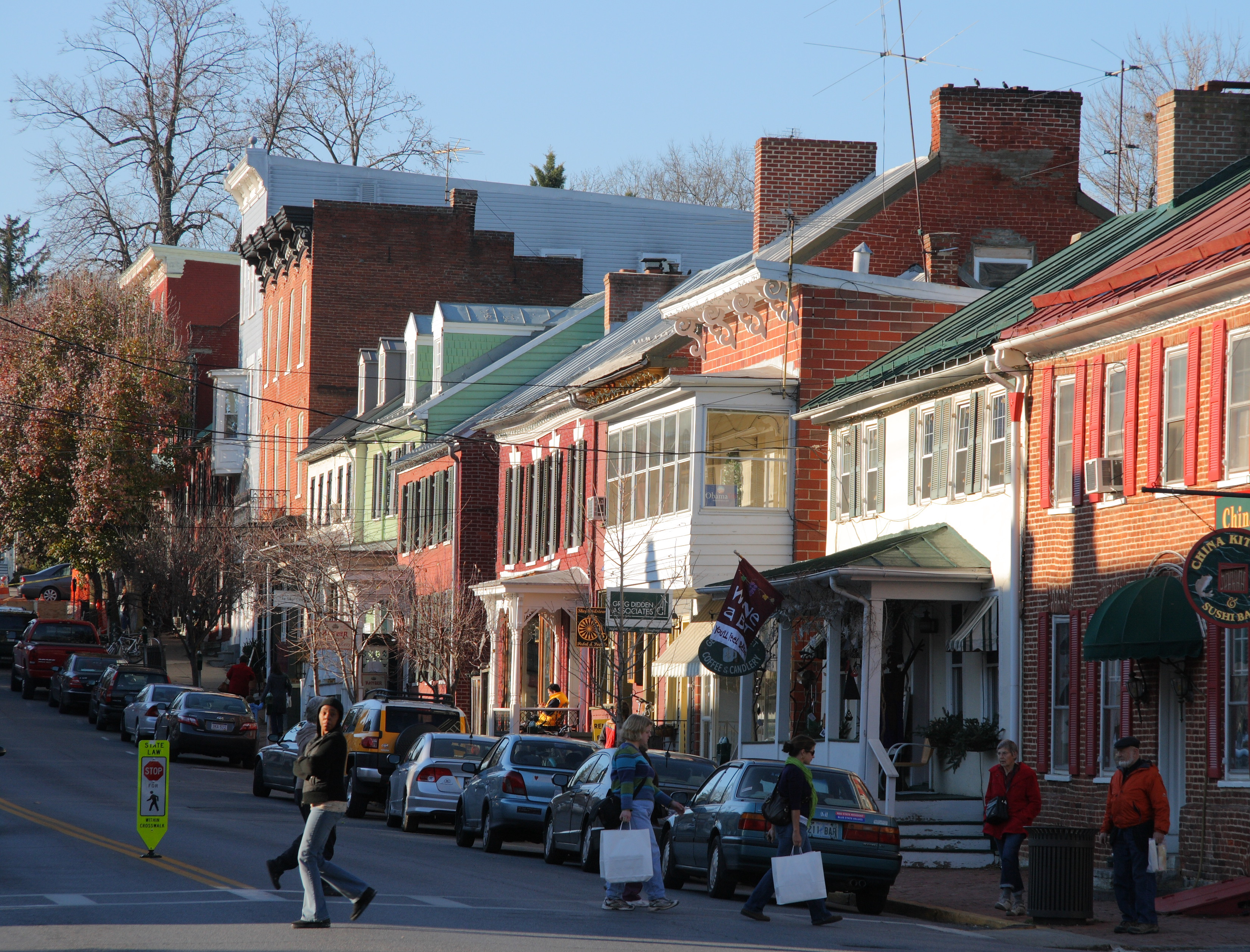
- German Street

- Location within West Virginia Location within the United States
- Location: Shepherdstown, West Virginia
- Coordinates: 39°25′58″N 77°48′24″W
- Architectural style: Federal
- NRHP reference No.: 73001920, 87001205
- Added to NRHP: August 17, 1973, expanded July 22, 1987

The Shepherdstown Historic District comprises the historic core of Shepherdstown, West Virginia. The town is the oldest in West Virginia, founded in 1762 as Mecklenburg. No structures are known to exist from the time before the town became known as Shepherdstown. The historic district is concentrated along German Street, the main street, with 386 contributing resources and 69 non-contributing elements. The chief representative period is the late 18th century, with many Federal style brick houses. German Street is also furnished with 19th-century "street furniture" such as metal fences, mounting blocks, wooden pumps and mature trees.

The town has a significant place in American history. James Rumsey made a public demonstration of a steamboat in 1787 on the nearby Potomac River. Shepherdstown was proposed as the National Capital in 1790, losing to Alexandria, Virginia, and Georgetown, Maryland, at the tidal headwaters of the Potomac. During the Civil War, Shepherdstown was in a pivotal position, with Confederate forces burning the covered bridge over the Potomac in 1861, then using nearby Pack Horse Ford to and from the Battle of Antietam. The entire town became a field hospital following this action. Later, Union troops occupied the town to preserve the Baltimore and Ohio Railroad link to the west.

Some of the more significant elements are:

- Baker House, a Federal style brick house with a Roman Revival porch, dating to the 1790s. It was the home of US Representative John Baker.
- The Great Western Hotel, owned by Jacob Entler. Originally a log structure, it was extensively modified in the early 19th century.
- The Presbyterian Manse, a brick Federal style or Classical Revival house, home of John Kearsley, a prominent local landowner.
- Trinity Episcopal Rectory, a Federal style house that was a home of John Baker, as well as US Representative Thomas Van Swearingen.
- The Lane House, a Federal style house once owned by Harriet Lane, niece and hostess for President James Buchanan.
- The Sheetz House, a Federal style house where muskets were manufactured during the American Revolutionary War.
- The Old Market House, the town's former market built in 1800, with stepped gable ends. A second story was added in 1845 by the Odd Fellows with a 999-year lease. The first floor has been a public library since 1922.

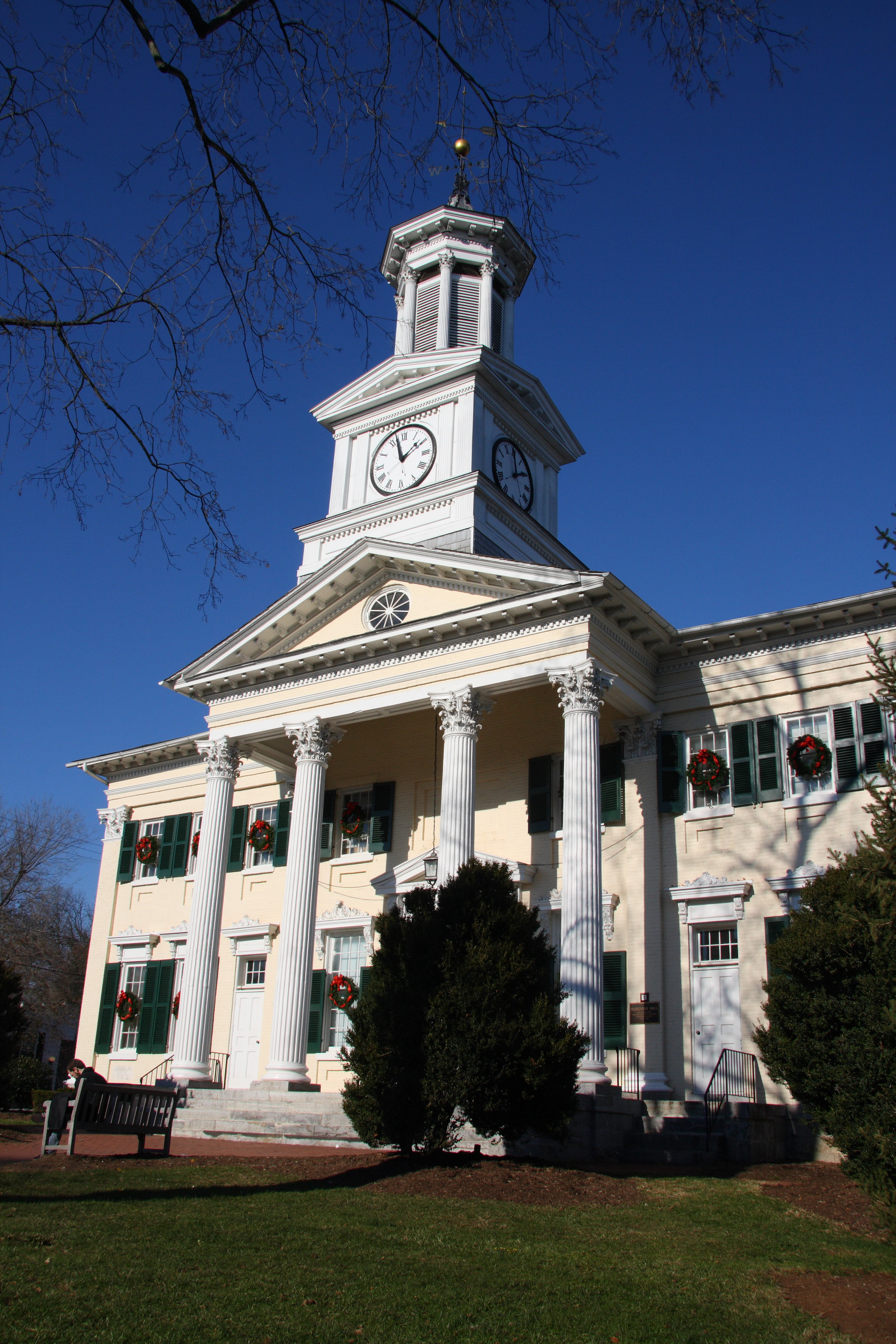
McMurran Hall

- McMurran Hall, a yellow brick Greek Revival building in the Corinthian order, which served as the Jefferson County Courthouse immediately after the American Civil War. It was later the first building used by Shepherd College.
- The Entler Hotel, a thirty-two room complex, which is itself on the National Register of Historic Places.
- The Shepherd District Free School, a public school on the campus of Shepherd University, built in 1868.
- The Chapline-Shenton House, built in 1793 on the site of the original Sheetz gunnery, and bought in 1818 by Captain William Delyea, stepson of General William Darke. Congressman Van Swearingen lived in the house during the winter. During the Civil War the house was used as a hospital following the battle of Antietam.
- The Weltzheimer Tavern, which housed the Potowmac Guardian and Berkeley Advertiser in 1790, the first newspaper published in West Virginia. The newspaper was operated by Nathaniel Willis, grandfather of Nathaniel Parker Willis and a participant in the Boston Tea Party. In 1808 the building became known as Weltzheimer's Tavern.
- Shepherd's Grist Mill, itself listed on the National Register of Historic Places.
- Billmyer House, a Federal style house that served as an inn, and home of Col. John F. Hamtramck, a figure in the Mexican–American War.

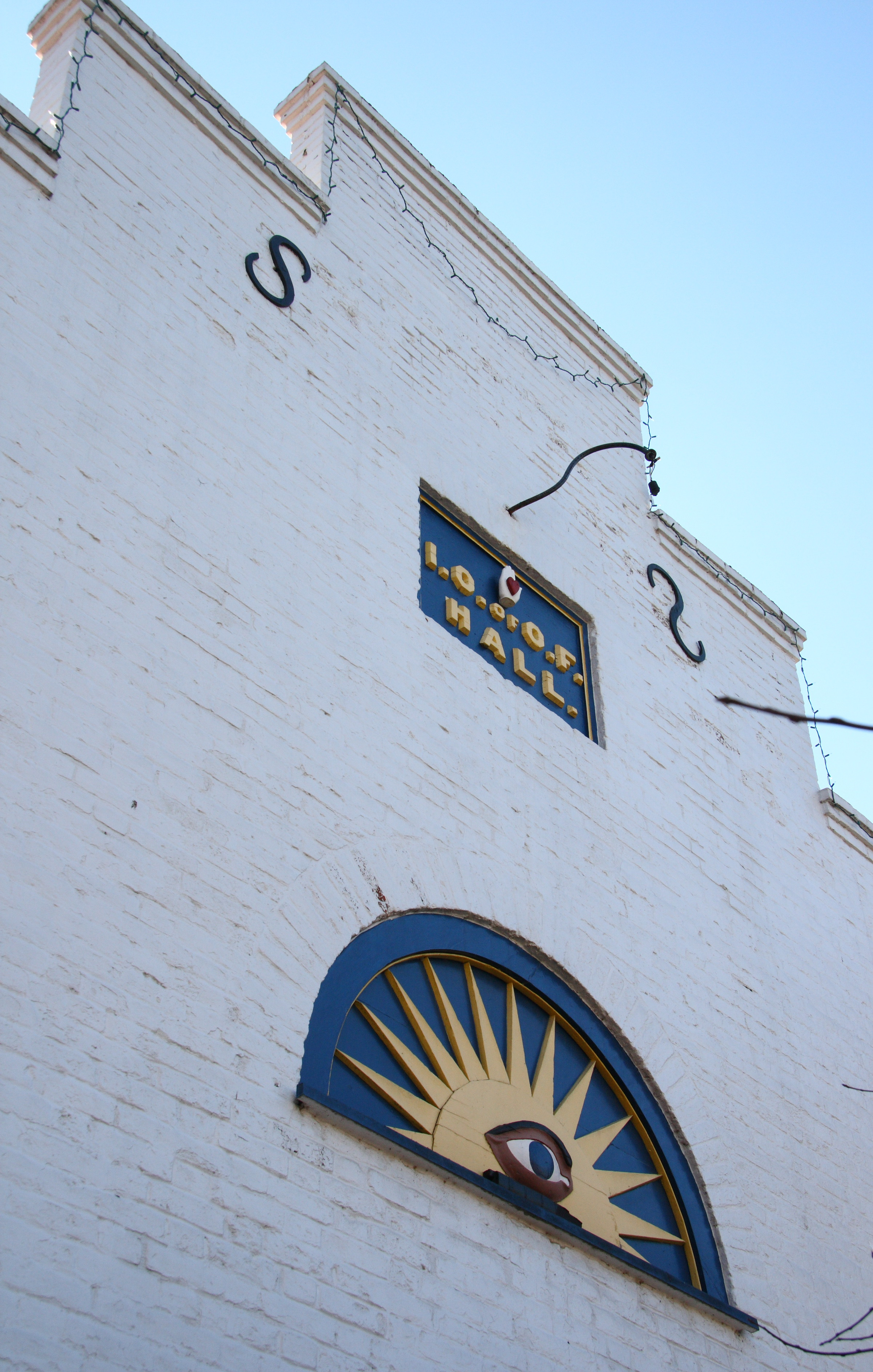
Old Market House

The historic district was expanded in 1987 to include properties from the late 19th century, including the Register Building, the Opera House and the Jefferson Security Bank. The expansion also includes Elmwood Cemetery, with a large number of Civil War graves. Outer portions of the expanded district include American Foursquare and bungalow styles of housing. The older portions of the Shepherd University campus are also included.
