= South Charles Town Historic District =

Historic district in West Virginia, United States

- U.S. National Register of Historic Places
- U.S. Historic district
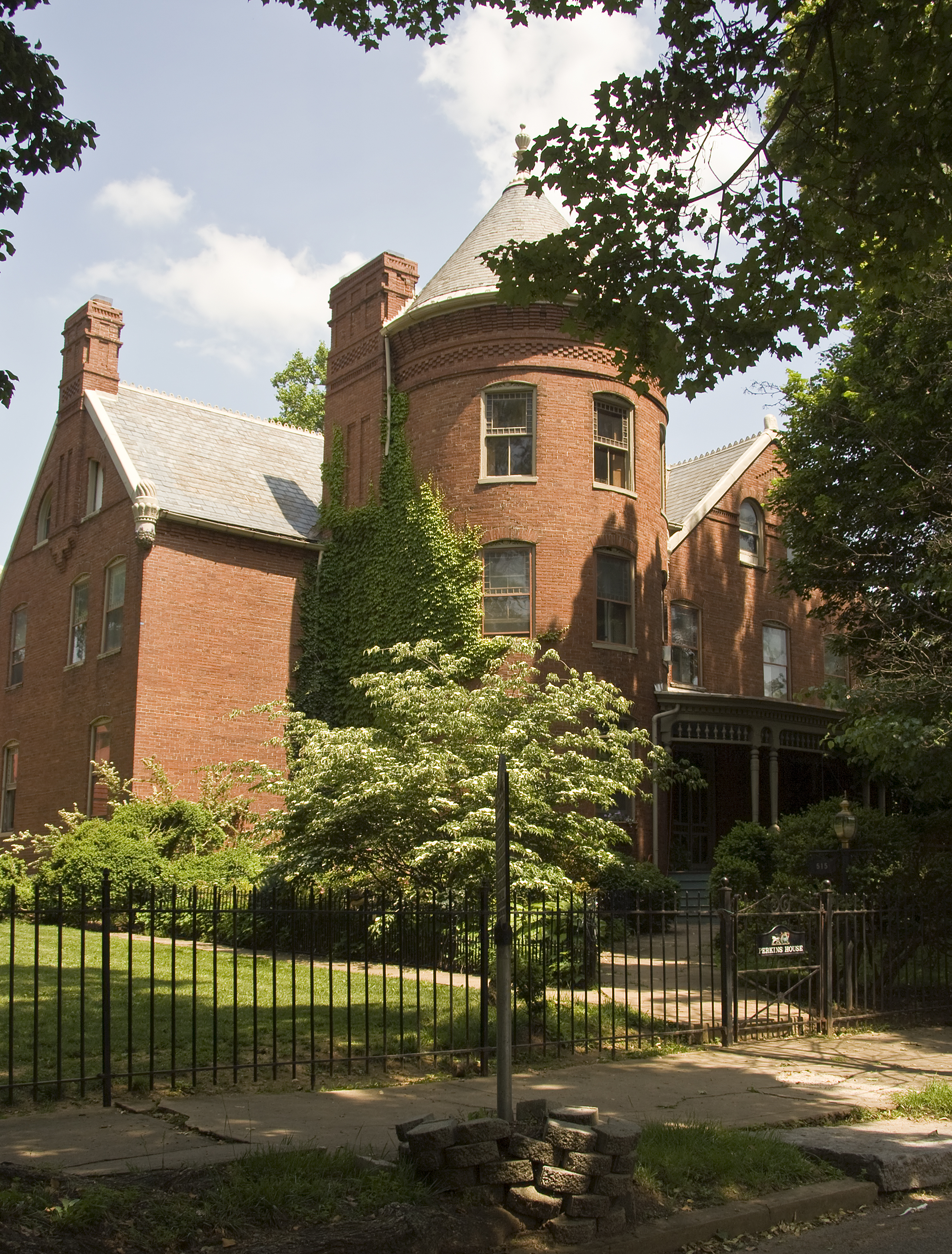
- Perkins House, May 2011

- Location within West Virginia Location within the United States
- Location: S. George, S. Mildred, S. Samuel, & S. Church Sts., Charles Town, West Virginia
- Coordinates: 39°16′40.85″N 77°51′8.95″W
- Area: 48 acres (19 ha)
- Built: 1840-1950
- Architect: Holmes, Julius
- NRHP reference No.: 09000733
- Added to NRHP: September 16, 2009

South Charles Town Historic District is a national historic district located at Charles Town, Jefferson County, West Virginia. The primarily residential district encompasses 145 contributing buildings and 2 contributing structures. It includes a number of examples of high style residential architecture and older architectural forms that survived the American Civil War. This architecture reflects the growing prosperity and economic diversity of Charles Town in the years between 1840 and 1950.

It was listed on the National Register of Historic Places in 2009.
