= Potomac Mills (Shepherdstown, West Virginia) =

- U.S. National Register of Historic Places
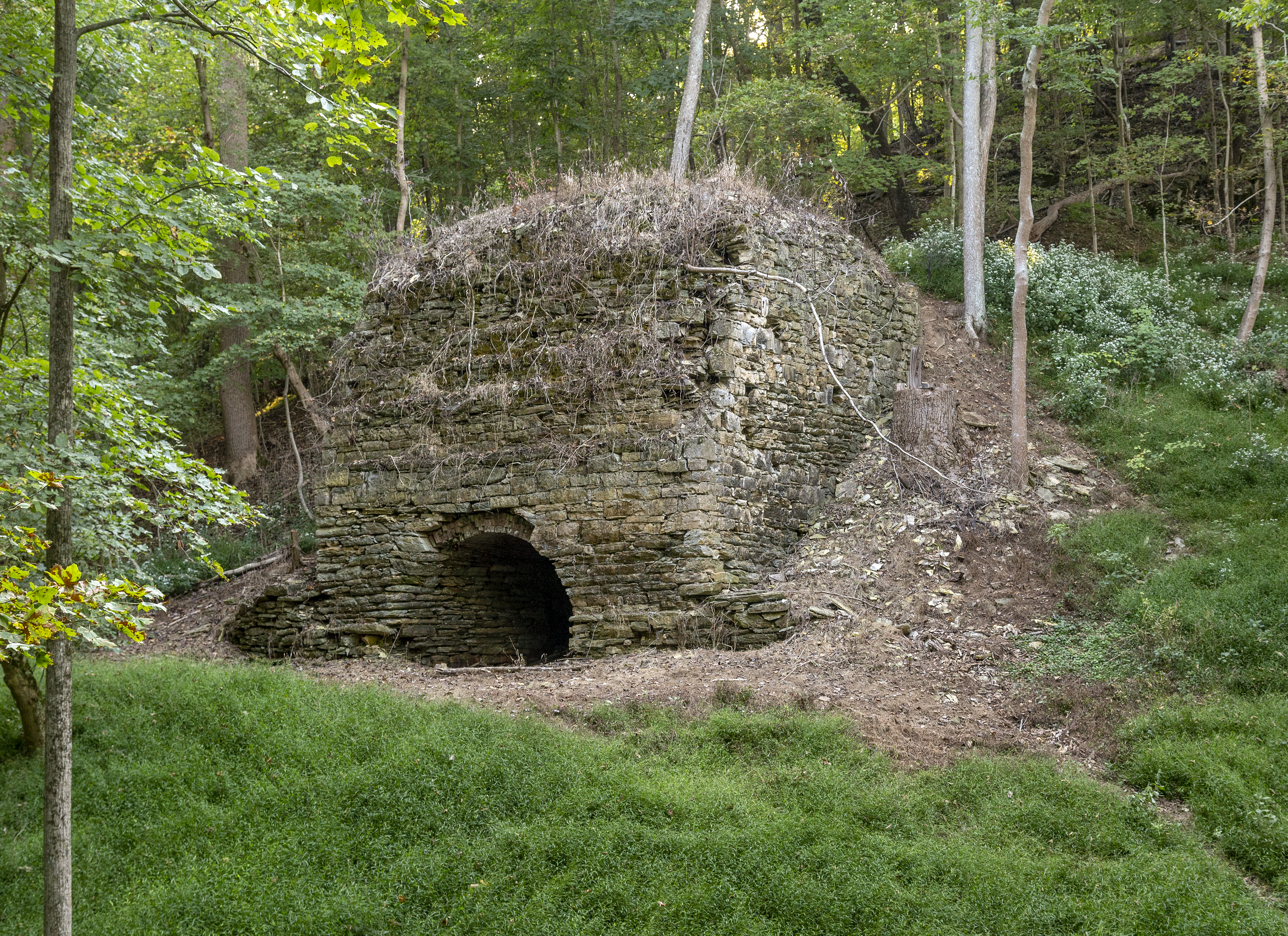
- The lime kiln in 2019

- Location within West Virginia Location within the United States
- Location: River & Trough Rds., Shepherdstown, West Virginia
- Coordinates: 39°25′42″N 77°46′48″W
- Built: 1826
- NRHP reference No.: 13001166
- Added to NRHP: February 5, 2014

The Potomac Mills was a mill complex located along the Potomac River roughly .5 miles (0.80 km) downriver of Shepherdstown. Built in 1826, the complex was originally used as a gristmill. In 1829, the mill began producing cement for the Chesapeake and Ohio Canal's construction. The factory continued to produce cement after the canal opened, and it shipped its product along the canal to other cities. Flooding and drought conditions in the 1880s led the mill to reduce its operations, and by 1901 the mill closed permanently.

The remaining buildings from the mill occupy an 18-acre (7.3 ha) site and are mostly in ruins. The buildings include the main mill building, several lime kilns, a headrace wall, and an office building. The stone foundation of the mill's dam, which extends across the river into Washington County, Maryland, is also still part of the site. The mill site was added to the National Register of Historic Places on February 5, 2014.
