= James Marshall House (Shepherdstown, West Virginia) =

Historic house in West Virginia, United States

- U.S. National Register of Historic Places
- Location within West Virginia Location within the United States
- Nearest city: Shepherdstown, West Virginia
- Coordinates: 39°27′15″N 77°49′31″W
- Built: 1835
- Architectural style: Greek Revival
- NRHP reference No.: 88001596
- Added to NRHP: September 27, 1988

The James Marshall House, also known as Marshall Hall, Marshall-Myers-Byron House and Windward is a property near Shepherdstown, West Virginia. The house was built circa 1835 by James Marshall and was known as "Marshall Hall" until about 1914. It became known as "Windward" in 1966.

Windward is a two-story L-shaped house in with Greek Revival elements. The brick structure features a small one story Greek Revival pedimented porch on a relatively plain facade. The flush cornices and simplified detailing are characteristic of an understated application of the Greek Revival style. The slate roof is a clipped hip form that follows the L shape of the plan.

The interior features Greek Revival detailing with plain surfaces. The center hall plan features a large parlor to the left of the hall, with a small parlor and library to the right. A kitchen and dining room are located in the rear extension, with a galleried porch aligning with the center hall. Three bedrooms and a bathroom are upstairs in the main section, with two chambers over the kitchen wing.

The foundation of a barn that burned in the early 1900s are visible, as well as the outline of what is believed to be a now-vanished log kitchen, noted in the Jefferson County deed book as having living quarters above.

The house was listed on the National Register of Historic Places in 1988.
