= Rumsey Hall (Shepherdstown, West Virginia) =

Historic house in West Virginia, United States

- U.S. National Register of Historic Places
- U.S. Historic district – Contributing property
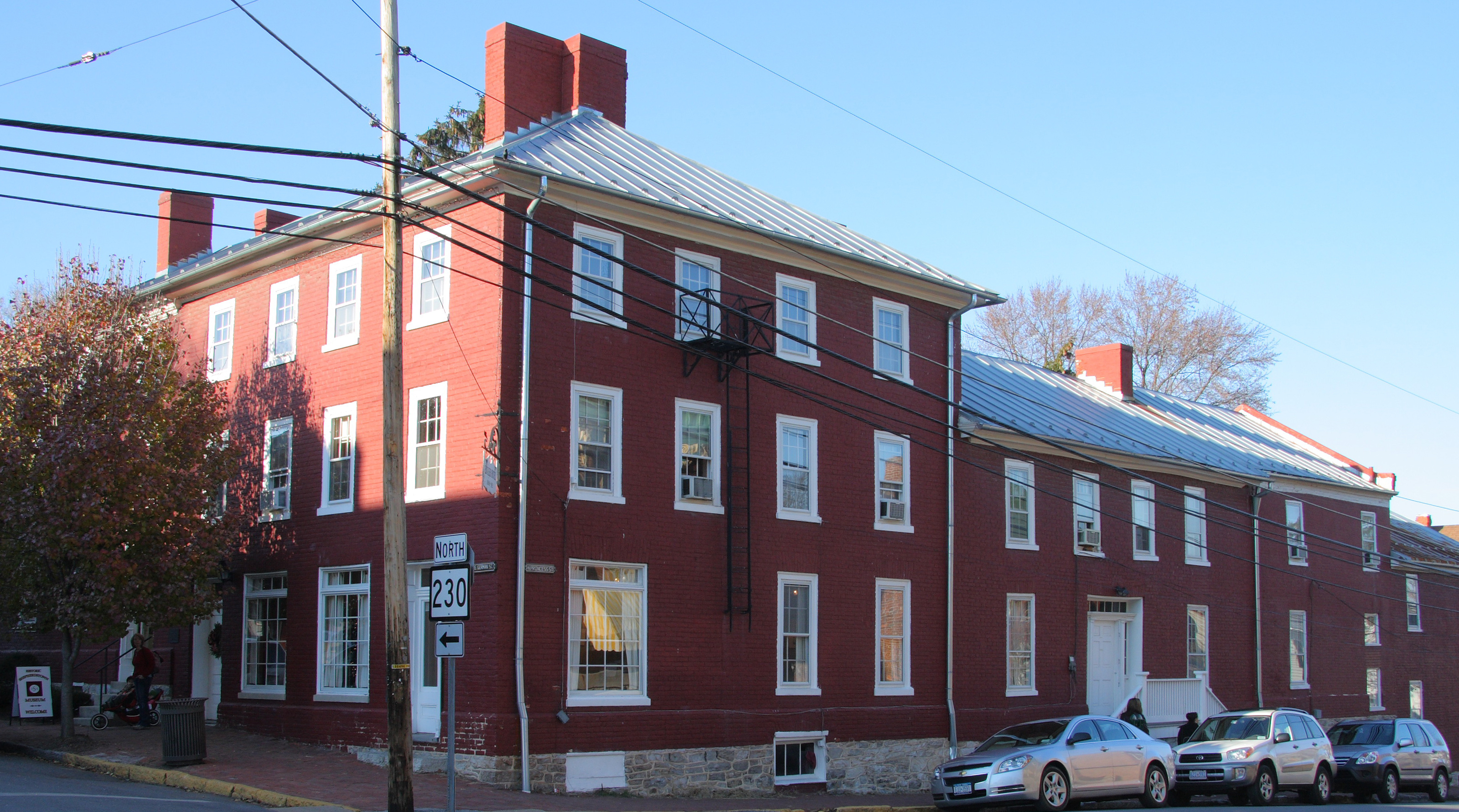

- Location within West Virginia Location within the United States
- Location: 129 E. German St., Shepherdstown, West Virginia
- Coordinates: 39°25′49.6″N 77°48′15.4″W
- Built: 1780
- Architectural style: Federal
- NRHP reference No.: 73001919
- Added to NRHP: March 30, 1973

Rumsey Hall, also known as the Entler Hotel, is a historic building in Shepherdstown, West Virginia. The building is located in the center of the Shepherdstown Historic District and is a composite of six separate phases of construction. The earliest portion was built in 1786, and was the home belonging to Christian Cookus. This section burned in 1912. This section was separated by a narrow passage from the core of the hotel property, first started in the 1790s by owner Daniel Bedinger. This Federal style structure was expanded to the corner sometime before 1809, with a further addition along Princess Street by 1815. A kitchen and a carriage house completed the complex. Significant interior features remain. In 1809 a store was opened in the corner building, operated by James Brown. At about the same time, the Globe Tavern opened, offering overnight accommodations. In 1815, Bedinger sold the property to James Brown and Edward Lucas for $6,000. In 1820 it was again sold, to Thomas Crown of Washington, D.C., for $4000. By this time the tavern was managed by Thomas James and the hotel by Daniel Entler. In 1823, Daniel Entler became the manager of the entire property. The Entlers managed the properties until 1873, when they moved to Piedmont, West Virginia, while retaining ownership of the hotel.

The Entler Hotel was one of two in Shepherdstown run by Entlers. Daniel Entler's brother Joseph ran the Great Western Hotel, and both were the sons of a German immigrant butcher and innkeeper from York, Pennsylvania.

The Entler Hotel was the chief venue in Shepherdstown for social events. After the Battle of Antietam, three miles away, Shepherdstown became a field hospital for the wounded, with many severely wounded brought to the Entler. On December 14, 1898, the Entler received one of the first two telephones installed in Jefferson County. Several fires occurred between 1899 and 1912, with a fire in 1910 killing the manager's daughter, who was playing with matches. In 1912 a conflagration burned several buildings on the north side of German Street, including the original Entler property. Omitted is James M. Tolliver, believed to have been Shepherdstown's first successful black businessman. He ran a hotel and ice cream parlor on the corner of German and Princess Streets. The original building burned down in 1894, and Tolliver built this structure. The Tolliver building's Clio entry says his name appears in town records from 1877-1908, and the town granted him an annual hotel license from 1899-1909. His 1917 will left everything to his wife, Hetty.

The hotel closed in 1917 and in 1921 it was sold to the State of West Virginia and became the first men's dormitory at Shepherd College, at which time its name was changed to Rumsey Hall. In the 1950s the building was used as faculty apartments, then as storage.

The Town of Shepherdstown bought the Entler from the State in 1978 after a bill was passed by the West Virginia Legislature that mandated that Shepherd College sell the building to the Town after a campaign to prevent the building's demolition, and began restoration work in 1982. The college was going to demolish the building and turn the property into a parking lot. The bill was sponsored by Delegates Clarence E Martin, III and Joseph Caudle. It is now used to house the Historic Shepherdstown Museum, office space for non-profit groups and for town meetings.
