= Rock Spring (Shepherdstown, West Virginia) =

Historic house in West Virginia, United States

- U.S. National Register of Historic Places
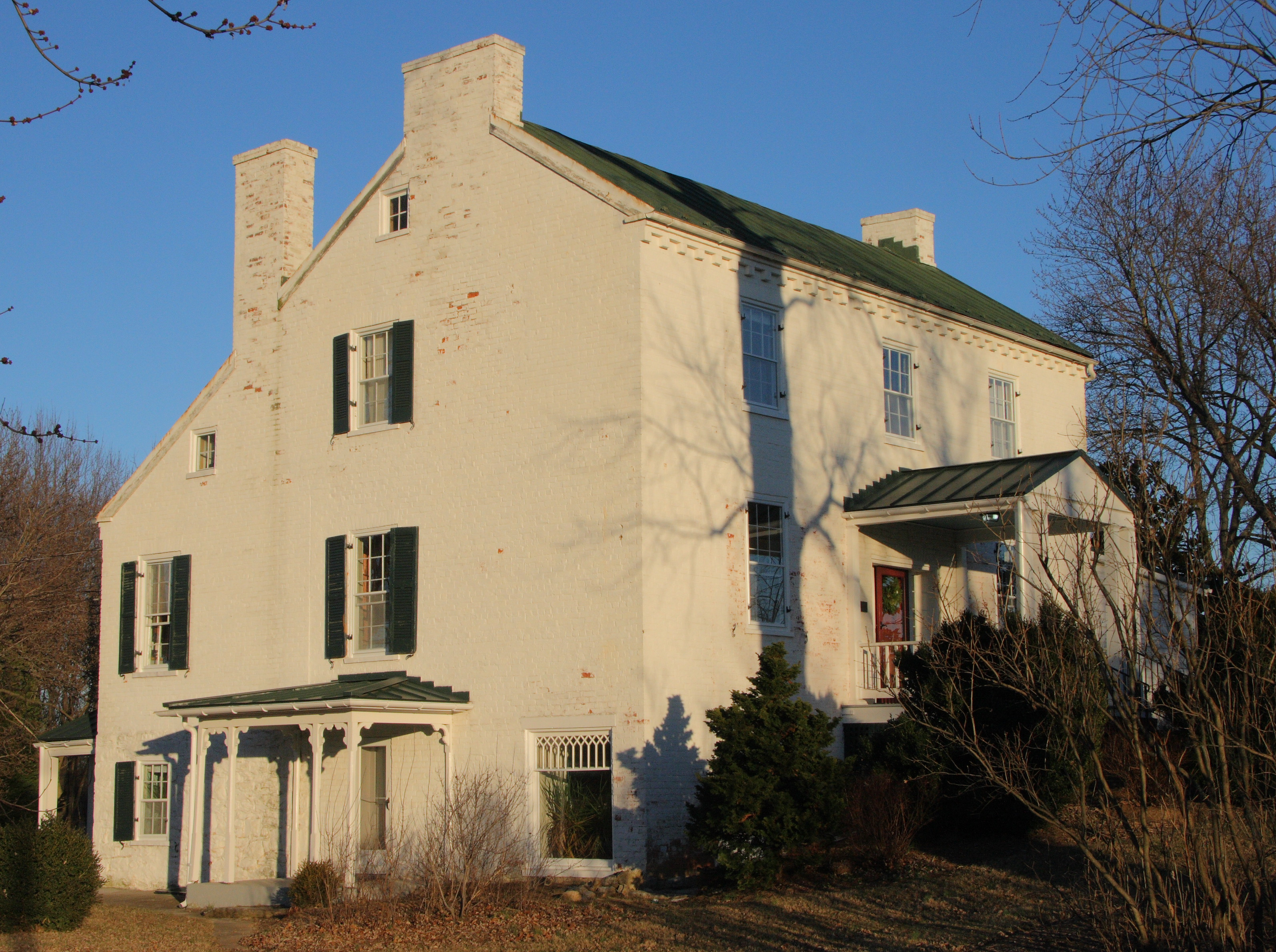
- The farmhouse in 2008

- Location within West Virginia Location within the United States
- Nearest city: Shepherdstown, West Virginia
- Coordinates: 39°22′57″N 77°50′38″W
- Area: 12.25 acres (4.96 ha)
- Built: 1790
- Architectural style: Federal
- NRHP reference No.: 07001416
- Added to NRHP: 17 January 2008

Rock Spring is a historic farmstead property near Shepherdstown, West Virginia.

== Description and history ==
The 12.25-acre (4.96 ha) L-shaped property fronts on Ridge Road and the four contributing buildings are along the road. These are a farmhouse, a spring house, a wagon shed/corn crib and a stable.

=== Farmhouse ===
The farmhouse is a two-story brick building with its gable end facing the road and the main facade on the south. A pair of brick chimneys, one at the gable peak are enclosed in the gable ends. The original building forms the core of the current structure. Brickwork patterns and techniques indicate a 1 1/2-story three-bay plan started as early as 1790. Main level windows are nine over six lights in frames with an interior bead, topped with a spacer. Spacers top the doorways on the main level also. A gabled entry porch on the east wall illustrates the pattern of additions over time. The farmhouse gained its current appearance c. 1850.

=== Spring house, bake house and kitchen ===
A stone outbuilding north of the building served as a combined spring house, bake house, and kitchen. This building is of rough coursed fairly large stone limestone has a window on each side. There are diamond shaped brick ventilators on the upper portion of the east and west walls. The entrance and a chimney are within the south gable end which faces the farmhouse. Also on the south wall is a rare surviving example of a once common household feature, a bake oven. The dome shaped brick oven sits on a stone base and has a vent at the back, extending into a flue across the top of the oven and exiting into the chimney, this feature gives the bake oven its distinctive "squirrel–tail". The plain masonry construction suggests the building was erected c. 1830 – c. 1840.

=== Wagon shed/corn crib ===
A combination wagon shed/corn crib is southeast of the house. The wood-frame building has stone foundations, is sheathed in vertical board siding, and is covered by a metal roof. With its uneven gable and extended roofline sloping north, the buildings design is consistent with a granary. Wide doors its west and east sides provide drive through ease for loading wagons. It was built c. 1850.

=== Stable ===
A stable sits at the southeast edge of the property facing the house and the pasture. The 15-by-20-foot (4.6 by 6.1 m) wood frame stable is clad in vertical board siding, and covered with a metal roof. The building's doors and the square stall windows are of board and batten construction. This building is from c. 1900.

=== History ===
The earliest European claim on the land the farm is part of dates to a 360-acre (150 ha) Fairfax Grant to Samuel Darke which was owned by James Hendricks by 1762. Hendricks lived on the property until selling in to John Snyder Sr. who already owned much of the other division of the Darke grant and recombined the majority of the original grant. It was his son John Snyder Jr. who added to the buildings on the property during the 1830s to 1850s bringing them to their current appearance.

The core of the farmhouse was built c. 1790 – c. 1810. The property was listed on the National Register of Historic Places on January 17, 2008.
