= Shepherd's Mill =

- U.S. National Register of Historic Places
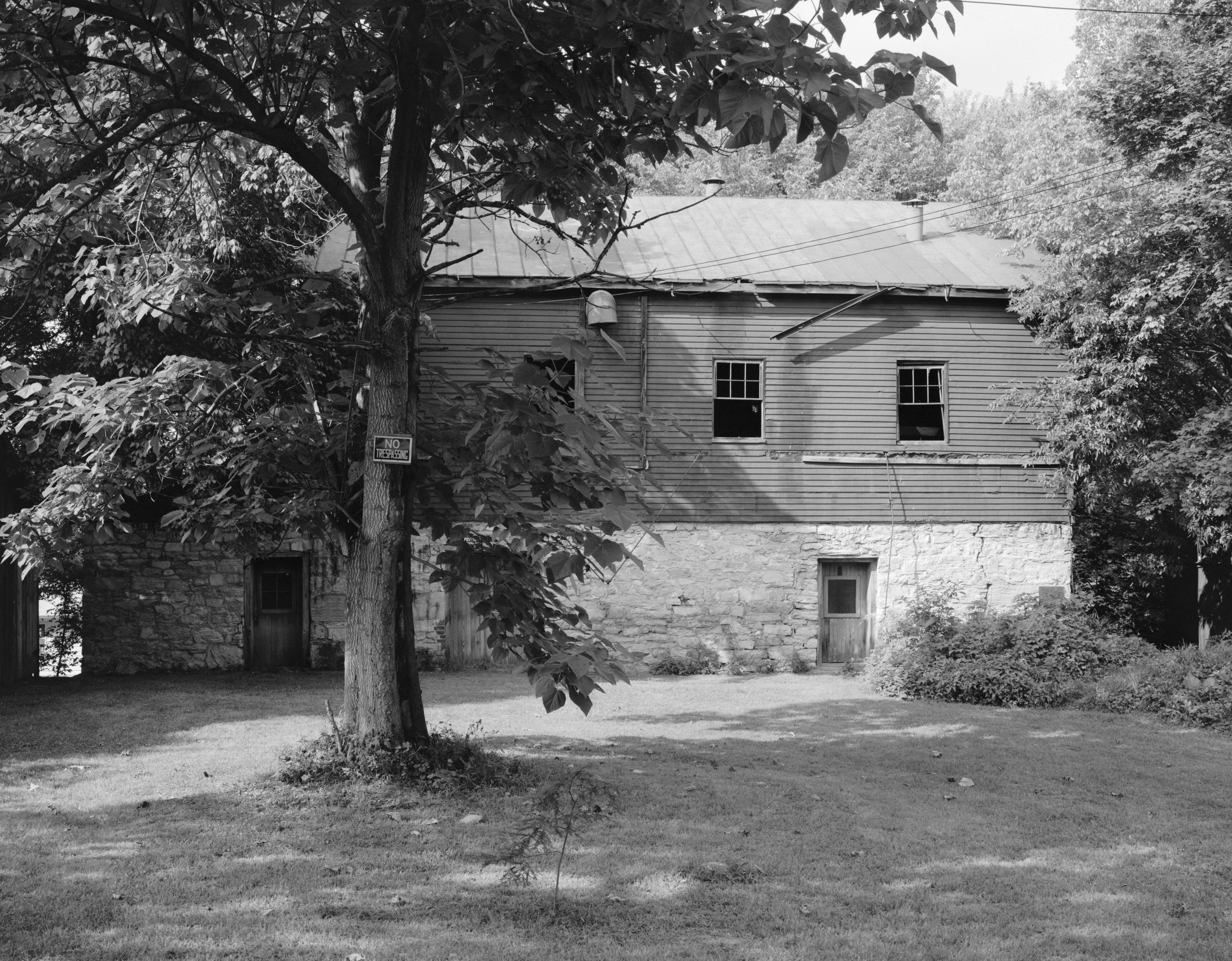
- Southern side of the mill

- Location within West Virginia Location within the United States
- Location: High St., Shepherdstown, West Virginia
- Coordinates: 39°26′0″N 77°48′5″W
- Area: 0 acres (0 ha)
- Built: 1734
- NRHP reference No.: 71000882
- Added to NRHP: May 6, 1971

Shepherd's Mill is a gristmill in Shepherdstown, West Virginia, located on Town Run just as it descends to the Potomac River. The mill was built some time prior to 1739 by Thomas Shepherd, Sr. (1705-1776) — founder and namesake of the town — as a two-story structure. The original millwheel was probably a wood overshot wheel. The present 40-foot-diameter (12 m) Fitz Water Wheel Company steel overshot wheel was built in 1894; with the addition of a third story in the late 19th century, the mill is more representative of that era.
