= Morgan's Grove =

Historic house in West Virginia, United States

- U.S. National Register of Historic Places
- U.S. Historic district
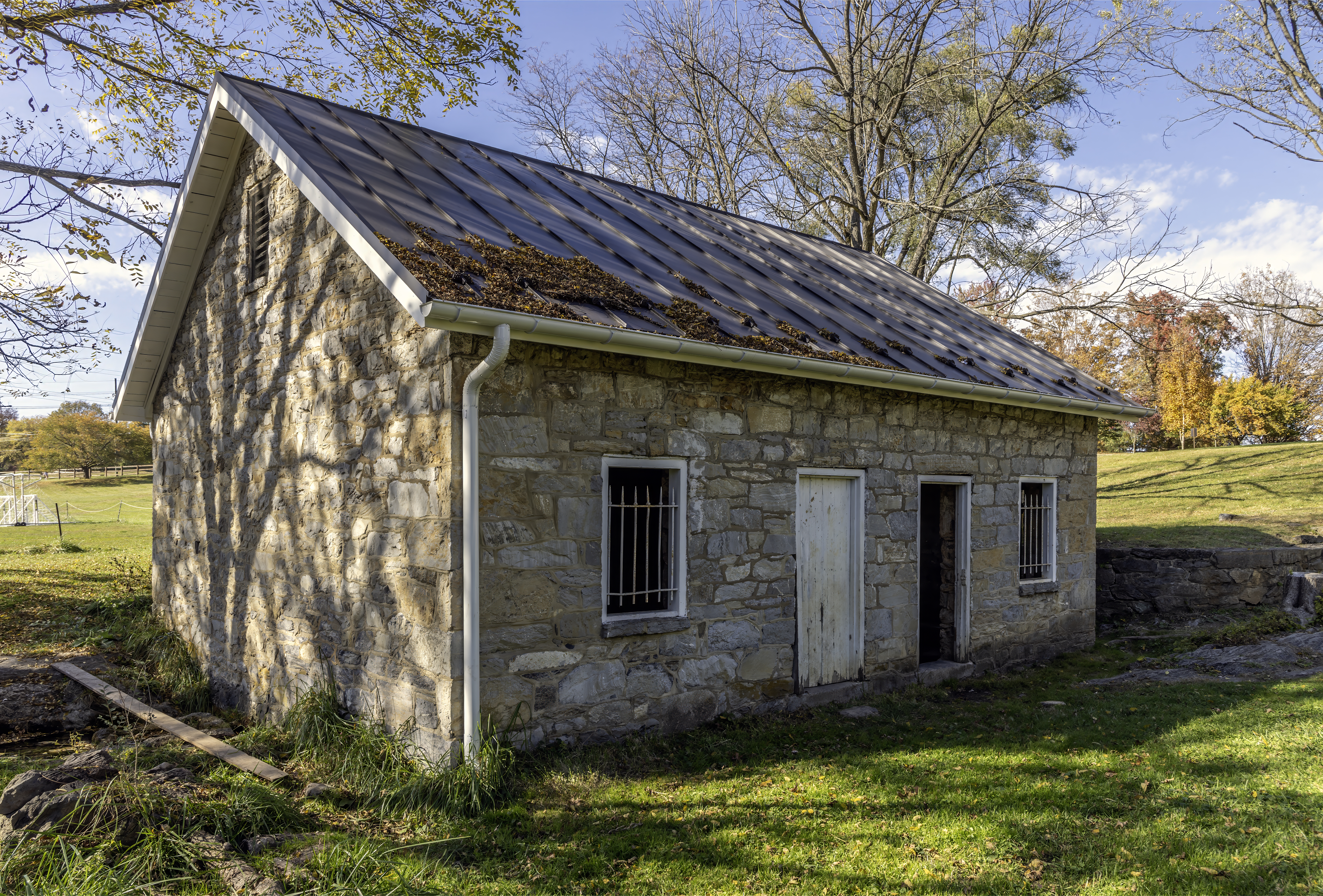
- Springhouse at Morgan's Grove in 2024

- Location within West Virginia Location within the United States
- Nearest city: Shepherdstown, West Virginia
- Coordinates: 39°25′4″N 77°48′45″W
- Built: 1775
- Architectural style: Georgian, Greek Revival
- NRHP reference No.: 99000286
- Added to NRHP: March 19, 1999

Morgan's Grove is a rural historic district near Shepherdstown, West Virginia. The area is noted for its abundant springs. Several historic houses and farms are in the district, including:

- Old Stone House and springhouse, c. 1734, belonged to the original settler and family patriarch, Richard Morgan.
- Rosebrake, or Poplar Grove, built in 1745, with dependencies including a barn and outbuildings
- Falling Spring, c. 1831–1837, with dependencies. The nearby woods were a Civil War encampment. Belonged to Jacob Morgan and his son William.
- Springdale c. 1760, home of Richard Morgan's son William, and dependencies. "Morgan Fort" was located on this property.
- Fountain Rock in Morgan's Grove Park with the foundations of the Fountain Rock house, burned in 1864 by Federal troops.

== History ==
=== 18th century ===
Richard Morgan (ca. 1700–1763) bought lands in 1730 that included much of present-day Shepherdstown. In 1734 he received one of the first grants of 500 acres (2.0 km^{2}) from Lord Fairfax, selling some land to Thomas Shepherd, who founded Shepherdstown. During the French and Indian Wars, Morgan was active in raising troops from the area.

During the American Revolutionary War, local men began drilling in Shepherdstown, and two companies of riflemen were organized in July 1775 at the request of the Continental Congress. By this time, William Morgan was a colonel in the Continental Army, and, under Morgan's command, the troops began the Bee-Line March on July 17, 1775, marching from Morgan's Grove to Boston in 24 days, covering 600 miles (970 km). The troops joined George Washington's forces on August 11, 1775, and were the first units from the South to join the fight.

=== 19th century ===
During the Civil War a number of Confederate and Federal units camped in the area, including General John B. Gordon and General George Armstrong Custer in the Valley Campaigns of 1864. About this time, Fountain Rock, which was then owned by Confederate Colonel Alexander Boteler, was burned by Federal troops under General David Hunter.

By the late 19th century the area was used as a fairground, with its own siding off the Shenandoah Valley Railroad. The Fountain Rock property was purchased by the Morgan's Grove Agricultural Association in 1889. In 1900 William Jennings Bryan, then candidate for President, gave a speech to a crowd estimated at 15,000. Fairs were held until 1931, when the land was sold and the structures were torn down.

A portion of the site is now a county park.
