= Van Swearingen-Shepherd House =

Historic house in West Virginia, United States

- U.S. National Register of Historic Places
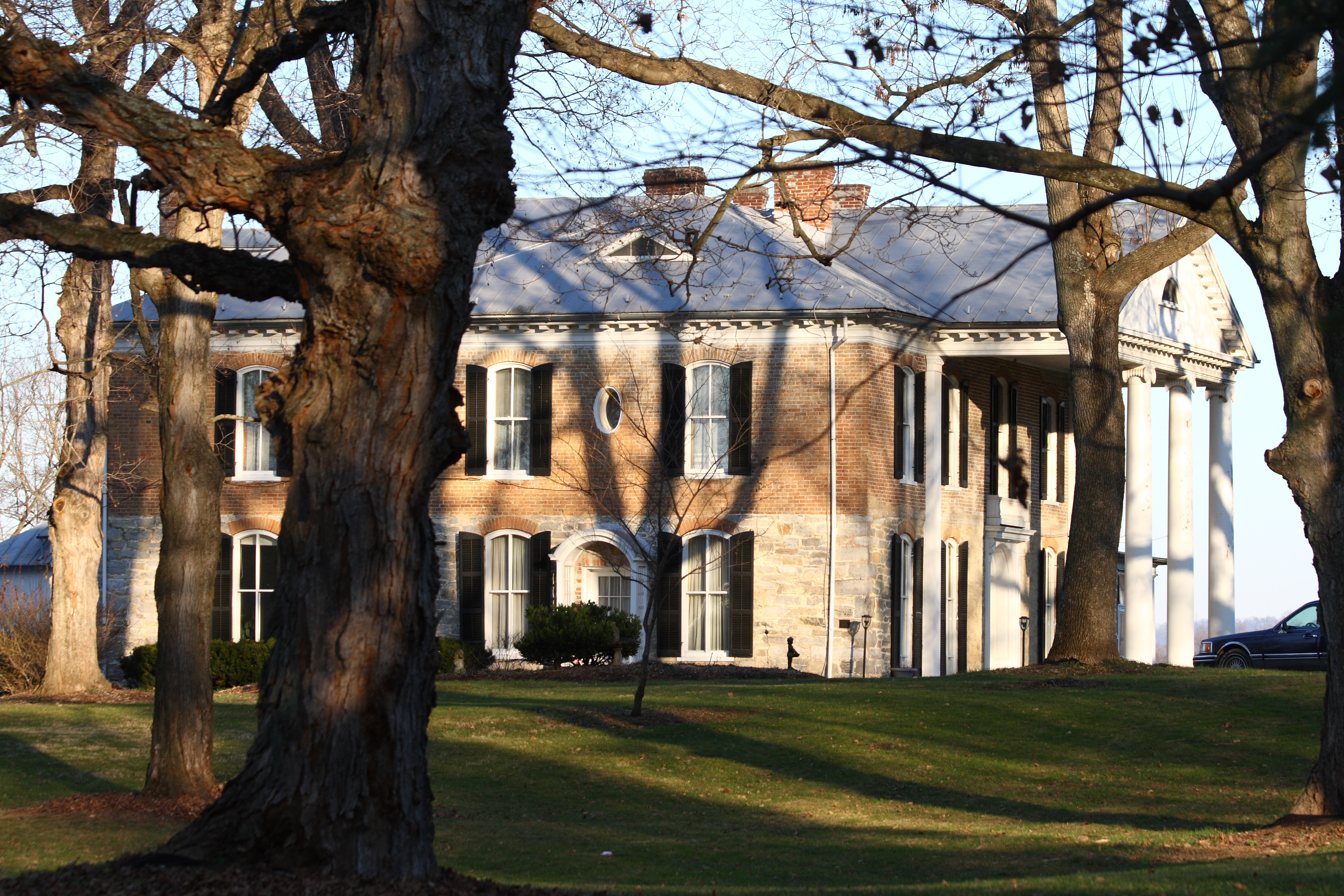

- Location within West Virginia Location within the United States
- Nearest city: Shepherdstown, West Virginia
- Coordinates: 39°26′21.9″N 77°48′16.5″W
- Built: 1773
- Architectural style: Colonial Revival
- NRHP reference No.: 83003241
- Added to NRHP: August 18, 1983

The Van Swearingen-Shepherd House, also known as Bellevue, is a Colonial Revival mansion in Shepherdstown, West Virginia that is home to the descendants of Captain Thomas Shepherd, founder of Shepherdstown. The house, situated on a bluff overlooking the Potomac River, was built in 1773 by Thomas Van Swearingen as a single-story stone house. His son, also named Thomas Van Swearingen, was a U.S. representative. The Shepherd family acquired the house in 1900, when Henry Shepherd III bought the house as a wedding present for his bride Minnie Reinhart, whose grandfather was Thomas Van Swearingen. That year, the Shepherds gave a dinner party on the lawn for William Jennings Bryan during his second presidential campaign. The house remains in the hands of the Shepherd family.

The original stone house has been extensively altered, with brick Victorian-era alterations exchanged for the present Colonial Revival style with a tetrastyle Ionic portico. The second story was added in the late 19th century, and all windows were converted to an arched pattern. In the early 20th century the Ionic portico was added by architect Stuart H. Edmonds.
