= Rose Hill Farm (Shepherdstown, West Virginia) =

Historic house in West Virginia, United States

- U.S. National Register of Historic Places
- Location within West Virginia Location within the United States
- Location: Jefferson County, West Virginia, USA
- Nearest city: Shepherdstown, West Virginia
- Coordinates: 39°23′48″N 77°51′45″W
- Architect: Thomas James
- Architectural style: Greek Revival
- NRHP reference No.: 90000716
- Added to NRHP: May 18, 1990

Rose Hill Farm, also known as the James-Marshall-Snyder Farm, is a double-pile, two story brick farmhouse with Greek Revival features near Shepherdstown, West Virginia. A log house on the property was built circa 1795, while the brick house was built around 1835. It is believed that the log house was built by Samuel Davenport, who leased the land from the Stephen family. In 1821 the property was sold to Thomas James.
