= Peter Burr House =

Historic house in West Virginia, United States

- U.S. National Register of Historic Places
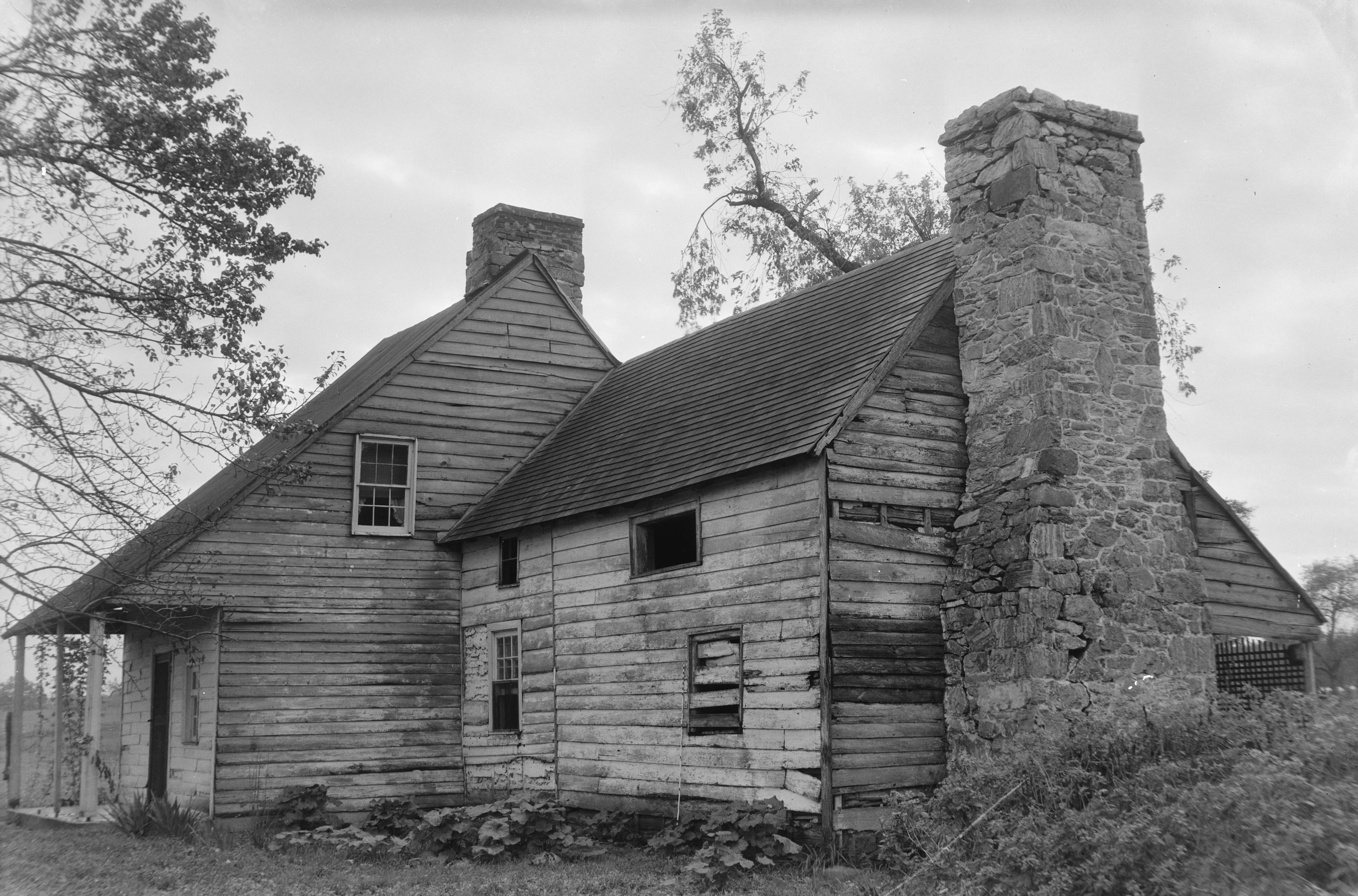
- Peter Burr House

- Location within West Virginia Location within the United States
- Nearest city: Shenandoah Junction, West Virginia
- Coordinates: 39°21′34.88″N 77°51′24.58″W
- Built: 1751
- Architect: Burr, Peter, II
- Architectural style: Colonial
- NRHP reference No.: 82004322
- Added to NRHP: April 9, 1982

The Peter Burr House was built between 1751 and 1755 near present-day Shenandoah Junction, West Virginia, making it one of the oldest houses in West Virginia. Burr, whose first cousin was Aaron Burr, was one of the first settlers in the area. It is the oldest surviving post-and-beam-construction house in West Virginia. The 9.5-acre (3.8 ha) property was acquired from Burr family descendants in the 1990s and has been under restoration by Jefferson County Historic Landmarks Commission.

== Description ==
The taller section of the house is the oldest, with brick filling in between log framing, covered with hand-riven clapboards. The steeply pitched roof overhangs the larger section on both the north and south elevations. An addition, lower in height, dates to 1804, and features a large limestone chimney. A two-story springhouse lies to the west of the main house.

The oldest portion of the Burr house has a hall-and-parlor arrangement, with the hall and parlor reversed from their usual precedence, so that the parlor is at the front door. A log kitchen was built in the 18th century, which was attached to the core of the house in 1813 with an intervening room.

== History ==
Peter Burr II was born in Connecticut, cousin of Aaron Burr, and was granted more than 800 acres (320 ha) in 1751 after arriving in Virginia in the late 1740s. Burr lived on the property until his death in 1795. As a cousin of Burr, and an associate of nearby landowners and soldiers Charles Lee and Horatio Gates, Burr was an opponent of the Washington family, who also owned land in the area.

The Jefferson County Historic Landmarks Commission has built a replica barn on the property.
