= Rockland (Shepherdstown, West Virginia) =

Historic house in West Virginia, United States

- U.S. National Register of Historic Places
- U.S. Historic district
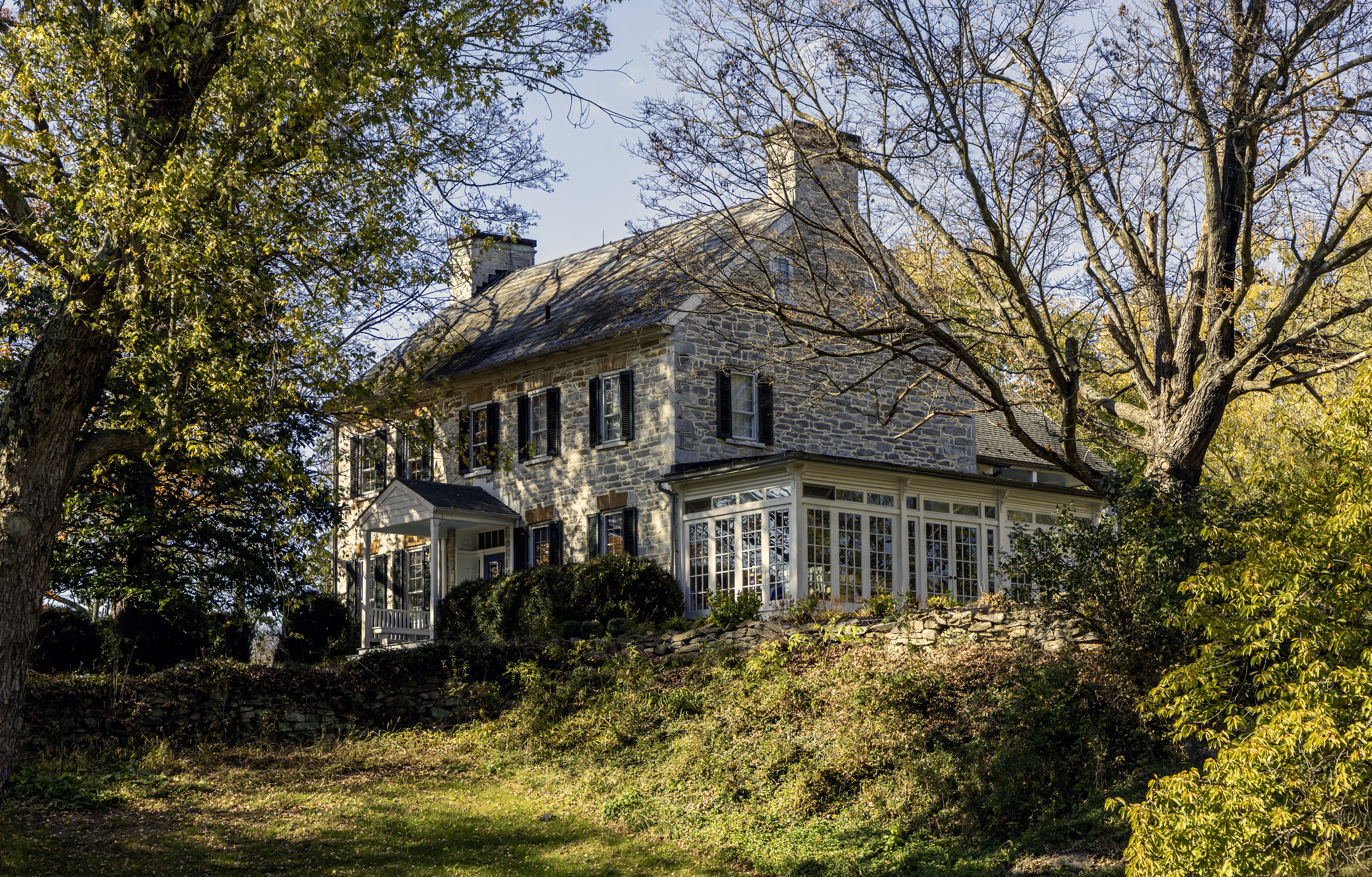
- Rockland in 2024

- Location within West Virginia Location within the United States
- Location: Jefferson County, West Virginia, USA
- Nearest city: Shepherdstown, West Virginia
- Coordinates: 39°24′30″N 77°51′29″W
- Built: 1897
- Architect: James Verdier
- Architectural style: Late Victorian
- NRHP reference No.: 89002316
- Added to NRHP: February 5, 1990

Rockland, also known as Verdier Plantation, Schley Farm and Knode House, was built by James Verdier between 1771 and 1785 near Shepherdstown, West Virginia. Verdier was a Huguenot, the son of a French silk weaver, who married Lady Susanna Monei and came to North America to escape religious persecution. In America he became a tanner, with tanneries in Martinsburg, West Virginia, Sharpsburg, Maryland and Shepherdstown. His children founded Verdiersville, Virginia after his death. The older portion of the house is stone masonry. A brick Victorian style addition was built in 1897.

Built largely of limestone, the two-story, five-bay center hall house has sandstone accents. A basement kitchen is accessed by a door in the gable end. The interior was remodeled with Greek Revival detailing in the nineteenth century.
