= Shepherdstown, West Virginia =

- Town
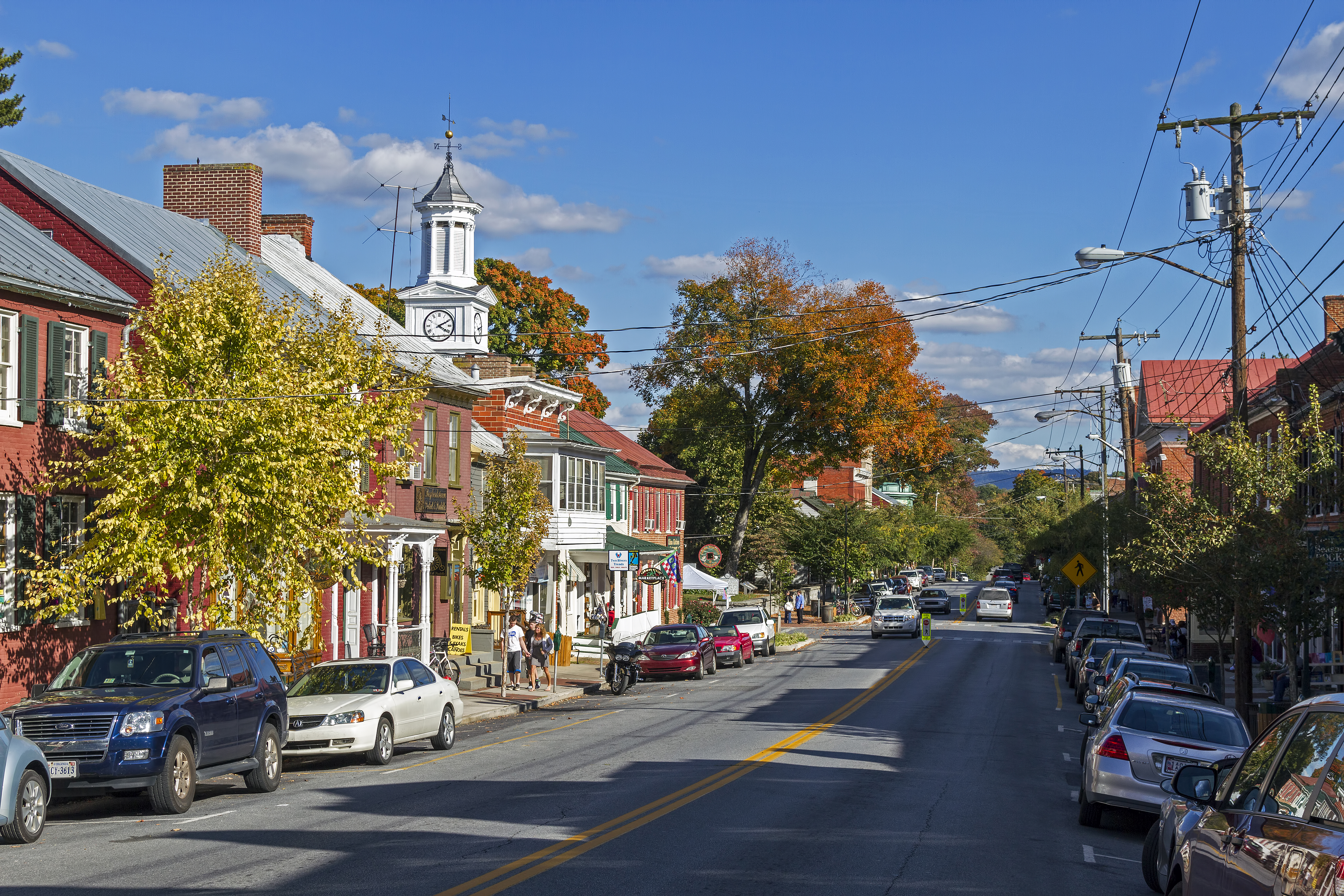
- German Street, Shepherdstown Historic District

- Location of Shepherdstown in Jefferson County, West Virginia

- Location within West Virginia Location within the United States
- Coordinates: 39°25′55″N 77°48′17″W
- Country: United States
- State: West Virginia
- County: Jefferson
- Settlement: 1730
- Established: December 23, 1762

Area
  - Total: 0.401 sq mi (1.039 km^{2})
  - Land: 0.401 sq mi (1.039 km^{2})
  - Water: 0 sq mi (0.000 km^{2})
- Elevation: 400 ft (120 m)

Population (2020)
  - Total: 1,531
  - Estimate (2021): 1,494
  - Density: 4,762.3/sq mi (1,838.73/km^{2})
- Time zone: UTC-5 (EST)
  - Summer (DST): UTC-4 (EDT)
- ZIP code: 25443
- Area code: 304
- FIPS code: 54-73468
- GNIS feature ID: 2391411
- Website: www.shepherdstown.gov

Shepherdstown is a town in Jefferson County, West Virginia, United States. It is located in the upper Shenandoah Valley along the Potomac River and is home to Shepherd University. The town's population was 1,531 at the 2020 census. Shepherdstown was established in 1762 along with Romney; they are the oldest towns in West Virginia.

== History ==
=== 18th century ===
Established on December 23, 1762, by consecutive acts passed by the Virginia House of Burgesses and approved by the governor, Mecklenburg (later renamed Shepherdstown), and Romney in Hampshire County are the oldest towns in West Virginia. On a list of more than 30 approved "publick and private bills" of that date, the bill containing An Act for establishing the town of Mecklenburg, in the county of Frederick immediately follows An act for establishing the town of Romney, in the county of Hampshire, and for other purposes therein-mentioned.

The first British colonial settlers began their migration into the northern end of the Shenandoah Valley in the early 18th century. Many crossed the Potowmack (now Potomac) River at Pack Horse Ford, about one mile (1.6 km) down river from the future site of Shepherdstown. The Colony of Virginia began issuing Valley land grants in the 1730s. In 1734, Thomas Shepherd (1705–1776) was granted 222 acres (90 ha) on the south side of the Potomac, along the Falling Spring Branch (now known as the Town Run). From that tract he selected 50 acres (20 ha) and laid out a town. Naming his town Mecklenburg, he petitioned the Virginia General Assembly for a charter, which was granted in 1762.

Shepherd was the sole trustee, owning the town and being responsible for its government. More than six natural springs feed Town Run before it enters the south end of town. It never floods, nor runs dry; it meanders through backyards, under houses, across alleys and beneath five streets. This setting was conducive to millers, tanners, potters, smiths and other artisans. As a result, by 1775, the town boasted 1,000 inhabitants. In 1775, General George Washington issued a call for "Virginia Volunteer Riflemen." Captain Hugh Stephenson filled the ranks of his company here. The troops departed from "Morgan's Spring," about one-half mile (0.80 km) south of the town limits, on July 16, 1775. This famous "Bee Line March" covered 600 mi (970 km) in 24 days. Thirty-eight Revolutionary veterans are buried in the surrounding area.

On December 3, 1787, James Rumsey conducted a successful trial of his new invention, the steamboat, in the Potomac at the north end of Princess Street. The first newspaper—The Potomac Guardian and Berkley Advertiser—and book (The Christian Panoply) in what is now West Virginia were published here (1790s). (The Shepherdstown Public Library has a copy of the book.) Shepherdstown was the birthplace of Robert Lucas (1781), the future governor of Ohio and territorial governor of Iowa.

A second charter, which allowed for self-government, was granted by the Commonwealth of Virginia in 1794. In 1798, the corporate limits were extended and the name was changed to Shepherd's Town. After the American Civil War, the town's name was officially contracted to Shepherdstown. The clay soil in the area was conducive to brick making. By the late 1790s, there were several commercial brickyards, and kilns could be built with little difficulty. In many instances, bricks were "burnt" at the construction sites. They were plentiful and cheaper than nails. Roofing material affected the market value and the insurance premiums of the brick structures. Those covered with tile were much more valuable than those topped with wooden shingles. Fires starting in the shingles destroyed many brick homes, mills, stores and outbuildings.

=== 19th century ===
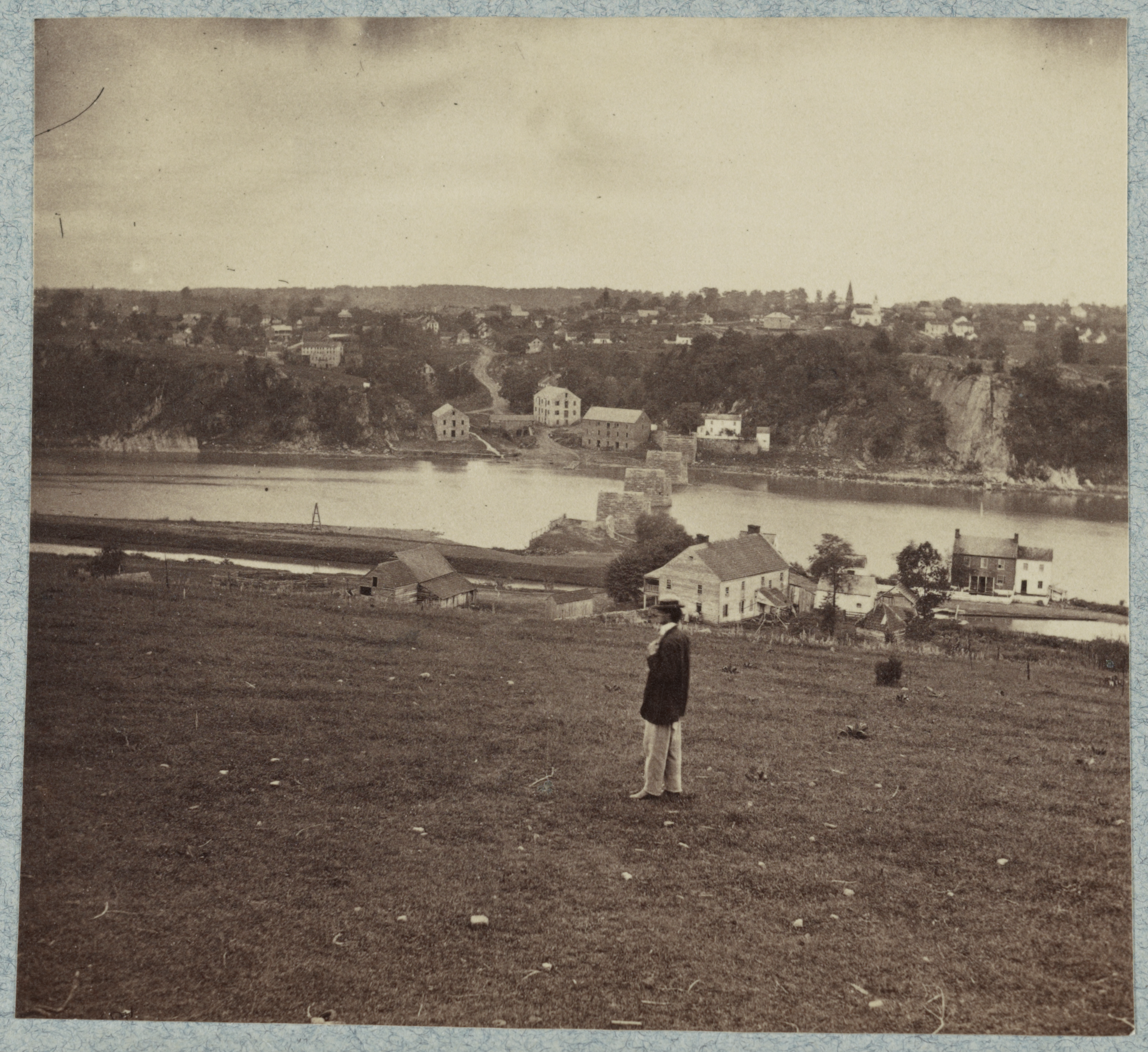
Lock 38 of the Chesapeake and Ohio Canal and ruins of a bridge across the Potomac River, ca. 1861–1865

Running along the Maryland side of the Potomac River, the Chesapeake and Ohio (C&O) Canal reached Shepherdstown in the early 1830s. Lock no. 38—named "Shepherdstown River Lock"—was built across from Shepherdstown at mile 72.7 of the canal. One of only three of its kind on the canal, it allowed canal boats to transfer between the canal and the river to serve industries in Shepherdstown with shipments of cement, coal, flour, corn, wheat, oats, flour, and timothy seed. Shepherdstown is the only town in West Virginia that has a canal lock named for it.

Two free schools were built in the town in 1848. One still stands on the southeast corner of Princess and New Streets. When West Virginia became the 35th state (in 1863), these became the oldest free schoolhouses in the state.

The Hamtramck Guard (The Shepherdstown Light Infantry) was dispatched to nearby Harpers Ferry to subdue John Brown's raid on the federal armory (October 1859). At the outbreak of the Civil War, this group became Company B, 2nd Virginia Infantry, Army of Northern Virginia. They became part of the famous "Stonewall Brigade."

After the nearby Battle of Antietam in Maryland, September 17, 1862, General Robert E. Lee's infantry crossed the Potomac at Pack Horse Ford. The town was overwhelmed with 5,000–8,000 casualties from the battle. Every house, building, church, alley, and street was filled with the wounded and dying. The Battle of Shepherdstown (also known as the Battle of Boteler's Ford or Cement Mill) occurred on September 20, 1862, during Lee's retreat. More than 100 Confederate soldiers died here and were buried in Elmwood Cemetery. Elmwood contains the graves of 285 Confederate veterans.

From 1865 to 1871, Shepherdstown served as the county seat of Jefferson County due to war damage to the courthouse in Charles Town. The Town Hall (northeast corner of German and King streets) housed the courthouse until it was moved back to Charles Town.

In 1872, the Town Hall Building was chartered as a "Classical and Scientific Institute." The building was then leased to the state and Shepherd College was born. In 2004, the Shepherd College became Shepherd University. The East Campus occupies about one-third of the town proper, and the West Campus occupies a large area just northwest of the corporate limits.

=== 20th century to present ===
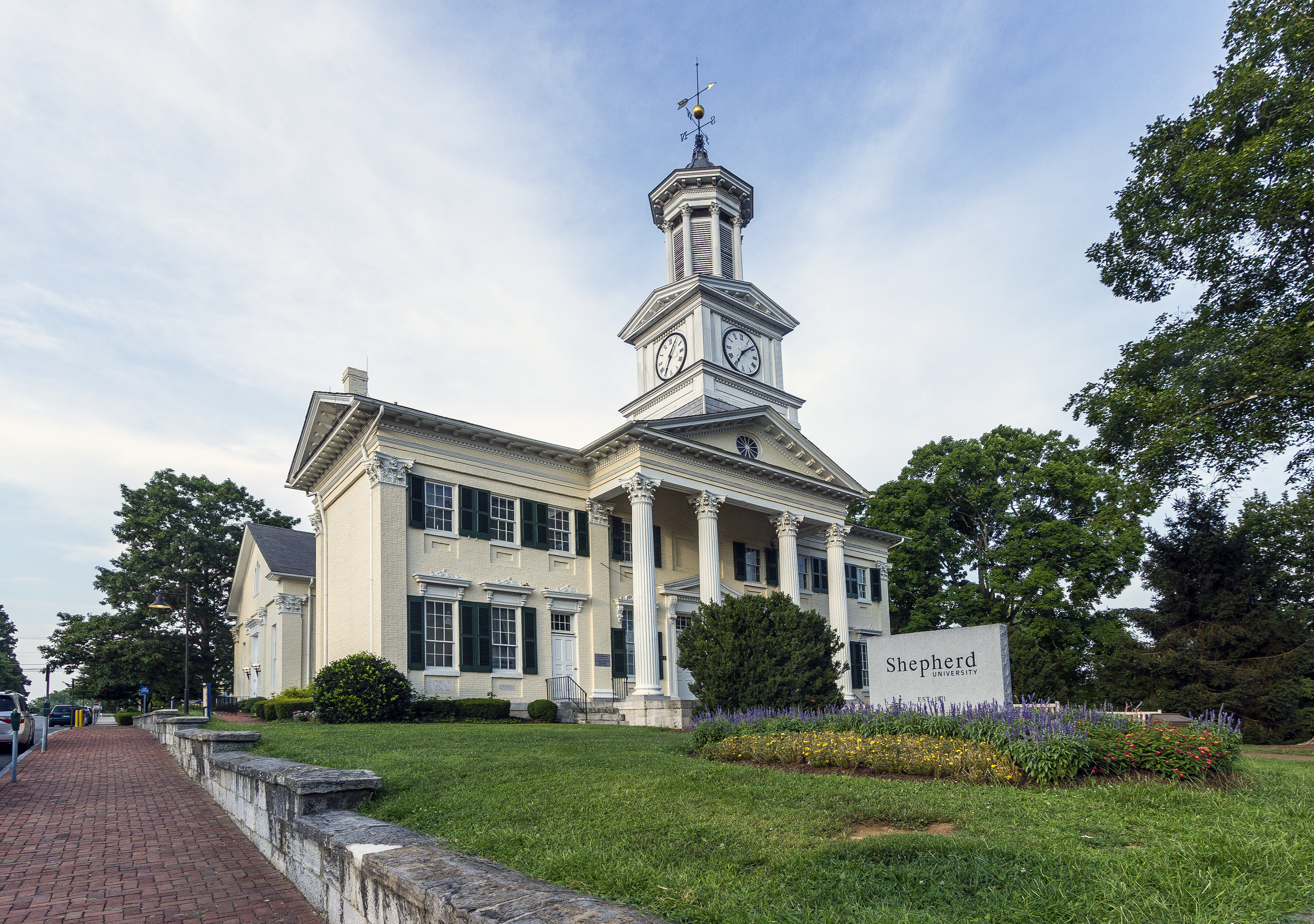
McMurran Hall, Shepherd University

The Shepherdstown Historic District was established and added to the National Register of Historic Places in 1973, with a boundary expansion to include the entire town in 1987. Potomac Mills located nearby in Washington County, Maryland, was added in 2014.

On January 3, 2000, Shepherdstown was the site of the Peace Talks between Israel and Syria.

In 2012, the town celebrated its 250th anniversary. Billed as the most haunted town in America, Shepherdstown is known as much for its ghostly residents as it is for the local arts scene, university, and historic attractions. On June 12, 2016, Destination America premiered the paranormal show Ghosts of Shepherdstown, starring Nick Groff, Elizabeth Saint, and Bill Hartley.

== Geography ==
Shepherdstown is located in the upper Shenandoah Valley along the Potomac River in the Eastern Panhandle of West Virginia. To the northeast, it borders Maryland.

According to the United States Census Bureau, the town has a total area of 0.37 square miles (0.96 km^{2}), all land.

Bedrock exposures of Cambrian-aged Conococheague limestone and dolomite are frequent in the town, and form cliffs between the settled area and the Potomac River.

== Demographics ==
Historical population
Census	Pop.	Note	%±
1850	1,561		—
1860	1,219		−21.9%
1870	1,389		13.9%
1880	1,533		10.4%
1890	1,515		−1.2%
1900	1,184		−21.8%
1910	1,070		−9.6%
1920	1,063		−0.7%
1930	888		−16.5%
1940	945		6.4%
1950	1,173		24.1%
1960	1,328		13.2%
1970	1,688		27.1%
1980	1,791		6.1%
1990	1,287		−28.1%
2000	803		−37.6%
2010	1,734		115.9%
2020	1,531		−11.7%
2021 (est.)	1,494	▼	−2.4%
U.S. Decennial Census; 2020 Census

=== 2010 census ===
As of the census of 2010, there were 1,734 people, 518 households, and 192 families living in the town. The population density was 4,686.5 inhabitants per square mile (1,809.5/km^{2}). There were 583 housing units at an average density of 1,575.7 per square mile (608.4/km^{2}). The racial makeup of the town was 85.5% White, 9.5% African American, 0.1% Native American, 1.3% Asian, 0.1% Pacific Islander, 1.0% from other races, and 2.5% from two or more races. Hispanic or Latino of any race were 2.9% of the population.

There were 518 households, of which 15.6% had children under the age of 18 living with them, 24.5% were married couples living together, 9.5% had a female householder with no husband present, 3.1% had a male householder with no wife present, and 62.9% were non-families. 33.2% of all households were made up of individuals, and 9.8% had someone living alone who was 65 years of age or older. The average household size was 2.15 and the average family size was 2.79.

The median age in the town was 21.9 years. 7.6% of residents were under the age of 18; 55.7% were between the ages of 18 and 24; 15% were from 25 to 44; 14.1% were from 45 to 64; and 7.6% were 65 years of age or older. The gender makeup of the town was 46.5% male and 53.5% female.

=== 2000 census ===
As of the census of 2000, there were 803 people, 410 households, and 168 families living in the town. The population density was 2,217.7 inhabitants per square mile (856.3/km^{2}). There were 454 housing units at an average density of 1,253.8 per square mile (484.1/km^{2}). The racial makeup of the town was 80.20% White, 17.19% African American, 0.50% Native American, 0.87% Asian, 0.12% Pacific Islander, and 1.12% from two or more races. Hispanic or Latino of any race were 0.87% of the population.

There were 410 households, out of which 13.9% had children under the age of 18 living with them, 28.8% were married couples living together, 9.8% had a female householder with no husband present, and 58.8% were non-families. 41.5% of all households were made up of individuals, and 12.7% had someone living alone who was 65 years of age or older. The average household size was 1.96 and the average family size was 2.72.

In the town, the population was spread out, with 12.5% under the age of 18, 19.9% from 18 to 24, 25.7% from 25 to 44, 25.9% from 45 to 64, and 16.1% who were 65 years of age or older. The median age was 40 years. For every 100 females, there were 100.8 males. For every 100 females age 18 and over, there were 95.3 males.

The median income for a household in the town was $40,750, and the median income for a family was $55,000. Males had a median income of $35,833 versus $30,139 for females. The per capita income for the town was $28,539. About 7.5% of families and 15.3% of the population were below the poverty line, including 8.1% of those under age 18 and 1.5% of those age 65 or over.

== Culture ==
Many of the town's historical buildings on German Street are now home to shops and cafés. The town is also home to many local artistic and theatrical groups, many of which are affiliated with Shepherd University or operated by youth groups. Shepherdstown also supports several restaurants and music venues. Monthly contra dances are sponsored by Shepherdstown Music and Dance.

Shepherdstown is also home to the first cohousing community in West Virginia, the Shepherd Village. The Shepherd Village was established in 2013 and now has 30 member households.

=== Historic sites ===
Site	Year built	Address	Listed
Boidstones Place (Greenbrakes Farm)		Shepherd Grade	1999
Cold Spring	1793	CR 17	1973
Elmwood	1797	CR 17	1973
Falling Spring-Morgan's Grove		WV 480	1989
Fruit Hill (Robinson-Andrews-Hoxton House)		Shepherd Grade	1988
Captain William Lucas and Robert Lucas House (Linden Spring)	1793	CR 31	1982
James Marshall House (Marshall Hall)		Shepherd Grade	1988
Morgan's Grove		WV 480, WV 230, Morgan's Grove Road	1999
Morgan-Bedinger-Dandridge House (Rosebrake)		WV 480	1983
Rockland	1897	WV 480	1990
Rose Hill Farm (James-Marshall-Snyder Farm)		Off WV 480	1990
Rumsey Hall (Entler Hotel)	late 18th century	German & Princess Streets	1973
Shepherd's Mill (Thomas Shepherd's Grist Mill)		High Street	1971
Van Swearingen-Shepherd House (Bellevue)		Shepherd Grade	1983

== Parks and recreation ==
Shepherdstown is a qualified Tree City USA as recognized by the National Arbor Day Foundation.

== Transportation ==
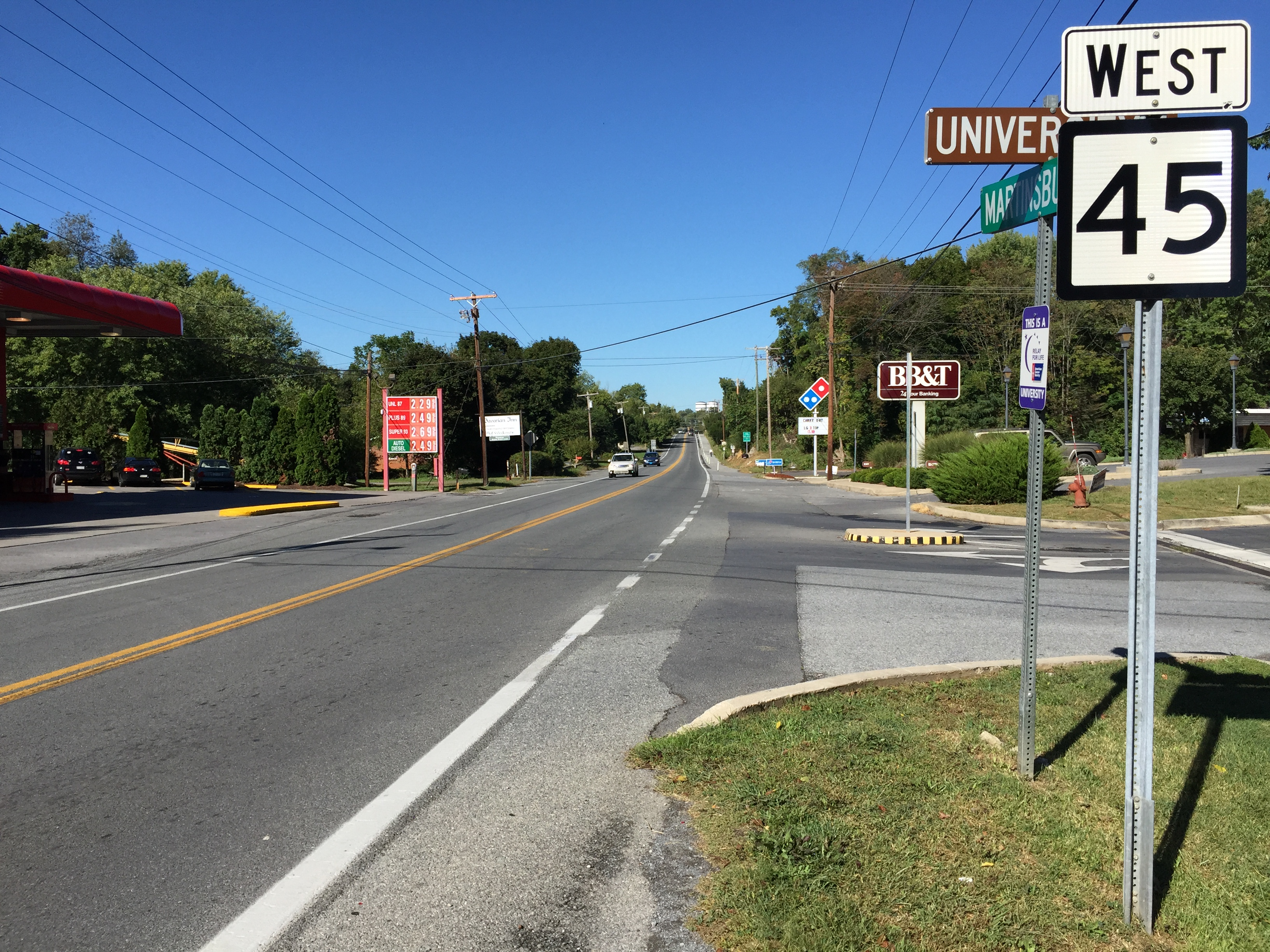
WV 45 westbound heading out of Shepherdstown

=== Highways ===
Three primary highways serve Shepherdstown. West Virginia Route 45 heads west from Shepherdstown to Martinsburg and Interstate 81. West Virginia Route 230 extends southward to U.S. Route 340 near Harpers Ferry. Finally, West Virginia Route 480 extends east to cross the Potomac River into Maryland, continuing as Maryland Route 34 towards Sharpsburg. Westward, WV 480 connects to West Virginia Route 9.

=== Public transportation ===
The Eastern Panhandle Transit Authority serves Shepherd University.

A bus service was preposed in 2020; route 21, however, is low priority for the agency.

== Notable people ==
- John James Abert, (1788–1863), topographer and founder of the National Institute of Science
- Tyson Bagent (b. 2000), NFL quarterback, played college football at Shepherd University
- Danielle Corsetto (b. 1981), artist and author of the Girls With Slingshots webcomic
- Danske Dandridge (1854–1914), poet, writer, and historian
- Violet Dandridge (1878–1956), scientific illustrator, painter, naturalist, and suffragist
- John F. Hamtramck (1798–1858), United States Army officer, planter and Shepherdstown mayor
- Frances Meehan Latterell (1920–2008), plant pathologist; retired in Shepherdstown
- Edwin Gray Lee (1837–1870), Confederate brigadier general, lawyer, and relative of Robert E. Lee
- James Rumsey (1743–1792), inventor of an early steam-powered ship
- Jim Tennant (1907–1967), former MLB pitcher
- Peter Tompkins, (1919–2007), journalist, Office of Strategic Services spy in Rome
- John R. Miller, (1986), Singer Songwriter, jrmillermusic.com
