= Rainbow Grocery Cooperative =

Worker-owned food cooperative in California, US

Coordinates: 37°46′9.27″N 122°24′55.91″W

- Type: Worker cooperative
- Industry: Grocery store, health food store
- Founded: 1975
- Headquarters: San Francisco, California, United States
- Area served: San Francisco/Bay Area
- Products: Natural organic vegetarian food, household supplies, bath and body, supplements, and herbs
- Members: 200+
- Website: rainbow.coop

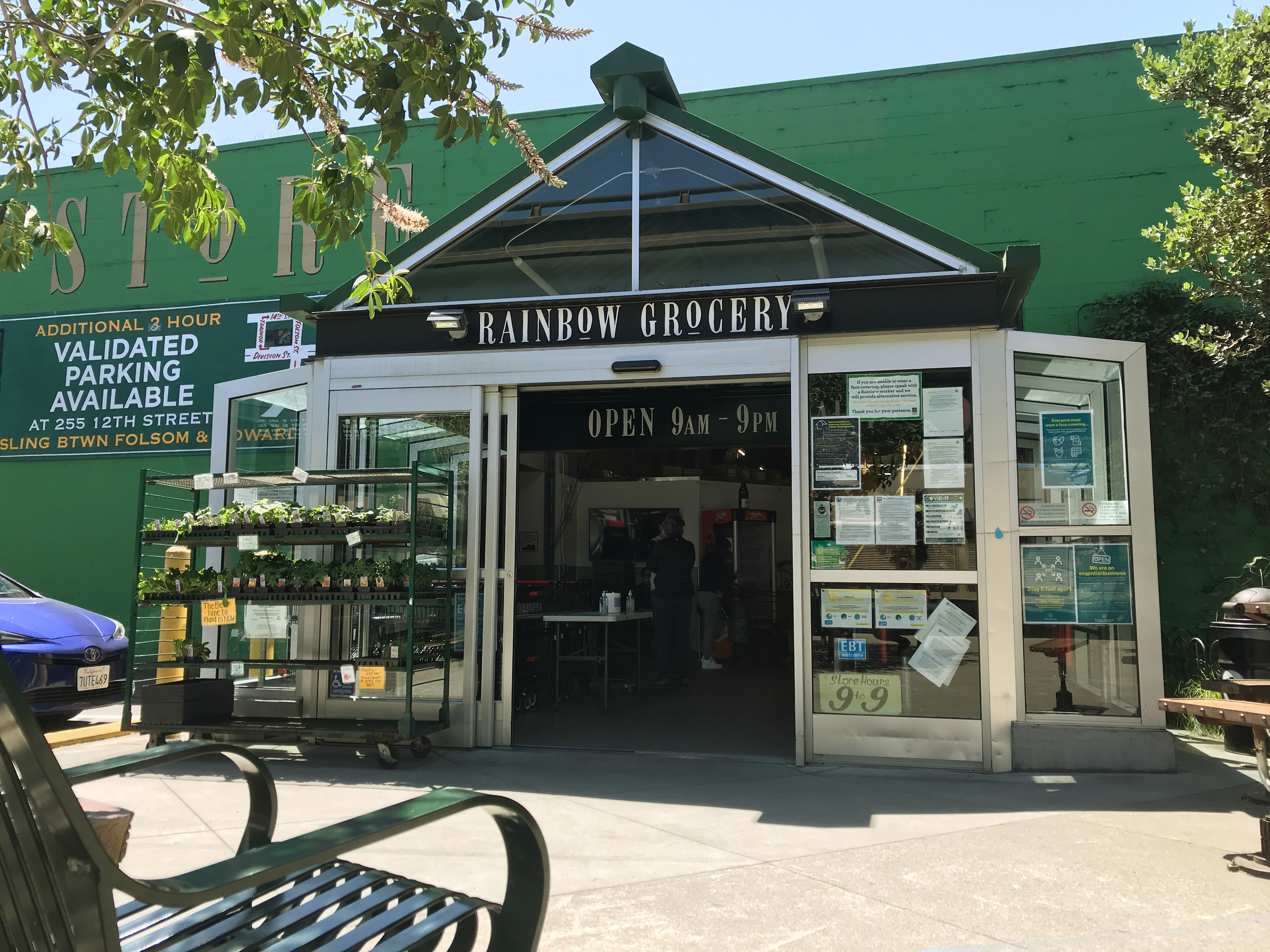
Rainbow Grocery's 13th St. Entrance, taken May 2021

Rainbow Grocery Cooperative is a worker-owned and run food cooperative located in San Francisco, California. Founded in 1975, Rainbow Grocery is a member of NoBAWC and the United States Federation of Worker Cooperatives.

== History ==
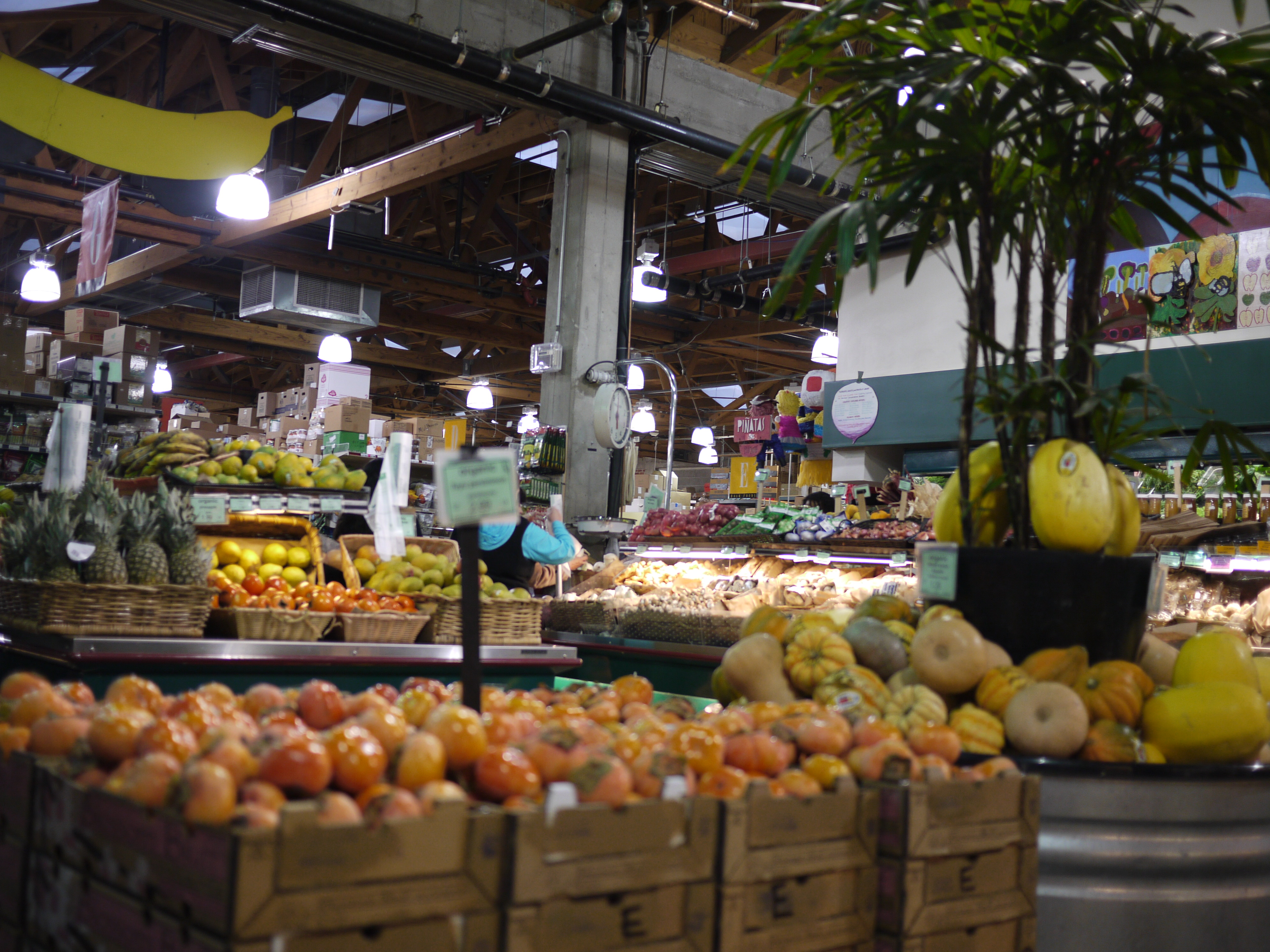
Interior of Rainbow Grocery Cooperative

Rainbow Grocery began as a bulk food-buying program by followers of Guru Maharaji (Prem Pal Rawat), a spiritual teacher San Francisco in the early 1970s; it quickly became a secular project. The buying program was coordinated by an ashram member who worked with the People's Common Operating Warehouse of San Francisco, a political project using food distribution as a form of community organizing and political education. The People's Warehouse was striving to build a "People’s Food System", including a network of small community food stores throughout San Francisco.

In 1975, Rainbow Grocery opened a storefront on 16th Street in the Mission District of San Francisco. At this time, the People's Food System already had two stores in San Francisco: Seeds of Life, in the lower Mission District, and Noe Valley Community Store. The ashram members who organized the opening of Rainbow Grocery did so largely by studying and copying the operations of the Noe Valley store. Rainbow Grocery opened exclusively reliant on volunteer labor. After the first few months, there was enough income to pay the project's two most active workers. As the store became increasingly successful, it was able to bring more workers on as paid staff, although people were generally not brought on to payroll until after several months of consistent volunteering. As the staff at Rainbow grew larger, the need for more defined organizational relationships also increased.

For the purpose of simplicity, Rainbow was started under the legal ownership of two of its founders. Though the store operated collectively, this meant that these two people were responsible for reporting Rainbow's operations on their tax forms and were responsible for any debts or lawsuits. In 1976, ownership was transferred to a nonprofit corporation. When incorporating, Rainbow simply adapted the corporate documents of the People's Warehouse, which included the Warehouse's statement of six political principles underlying the People's Food System. Including the six principles was done, in part, as an attempt to appease people at the Warehouse's who thought Rainbow was not political enough. Adapting the Warehouse's incorporation documents also simplified the legal work of incorporating. Unfortunately, the Warehouse's legal model was not very appropriate or functional. The Warehouse had written up their incorporation documents with the hopes of obtaining tax-exempt charitable status, which they were unable to do. While Rainbow's workers already knew Rainbow Grocery would not qualify as a tax-exempt charity, they still incorporated using the nonprofit model of the Warehouse.

Rainbow started generating financial surpluses soon after incorporating as a nonprofit. In order to avoid generating a taxable profit, Rainbow distributed its financial surplus by increasing worker compensation and investing in expansion. Rainbow's first substantial expansion, in 1978, was the opening of a general store (selling vitamins, dry goods, housewares, books, clothing etc.). It was located a few doors down from the grocery store. The general store initially ran at a considerable loss and became a significant financial drain on the grocery store. The bookkeeper at Rainbow Grocery brought the issue to a meeting and the collective decided to task the main buyer for the grocery store with figuring out how the general store was losing money selling such relatively high margin items. A physical inventory took place on the odd date of November 6, 1978 and that along with better purchase posting and cashier training insured good reporting by product category (the registers were capable of 8 categories). Following the year end inventory it was discovered vitamins were being sold at 10% below cost rather than 10% below suggested retail. Fixing that plus adding display cases for expensive small items quickly reversed the situation and the general store became a strong support to the financial health of Rainbow Grocery.

Meanwhile, the People's Food System was becoming increasingly politicized and polarized. The various food collectives had been meeting in the system's Common Operating Warehouse. The group of representatives meeting was called the "representative body" or RB. The members of the RB were torn between paying attention to food politics and collective food stores as a revolutionary act versus using the energy of the Food System to participate in the broader counterculture movement of the time. In addition, the adoption of a representative democracy was somewhat at odds with the collective/consensus process of many of the stores. Finally, the RB elected a steering committee to organize and facilitate its regular meetings. This committee in turn drafted a "Principles of Unity" statement to which member stores had to ascribe in order to they might retain their membership in the People's Food System. At this point, the workers of the Rainbow Grocery Collective opted to go it on their own, preferring to focus on the issue of food and food access as right livelihood. It turns out that this decision was a smart one. The Warehouse increasingly became embroiled in political infighting which took on a violent character when, as part of its political program, the Warehouse began actively recruiting recently released prisoners for its workers. Unfortunately it recruited members of rival gangs, which engaged in a gunfight at the warehouse. The final blow to the Warehouse came in 1981 when a flood destroyed much of its stock.

In the next few years, Rainbow Grocery continued to grow. They outgrew the confines of the 1,700 square foot storefront on 16th Street. In 1983, Rainbow moved to a 9,000 square foot space on 15th and Mission. Business increased dramatically in the first year at the new location. With this growth, workers were able to give themselves their first substantial raise and obtain group health insurance. Another advantage of the move was that it allowed the Grocery and General Store divisions to share the same building, which promoted cohesion. Despite being under the same roof for the first time, each division retained its own cash register system, policies and organizational structure. There were even rules restricting workers from being in both collectives at the same time. People got around those rules, of course, but there was little inter-divisional (and even less interdepartmental) working in this period. Another significant organizational development made in preparation for the move was creation of a board of directors elected from within the membership, who met regularly beginning in 1982. Prior to 1982, all decisions were made in "Joint Meetings" of all workers from the Grocery and General Store divisions.

It was not long before the Mission Street store outgrew itself. Even by 1988, customers and workers were literally climbing over each other to get to products in the store. As Rainbow approached the end of its 10-year lease, it was more and more apparent that the space at Mission and 15th was not adequate. When overcrowding at the Mission & 15th location inspired Rainbow to look again for a larger space, the collective acted to re-form as a cooperative corporation (a legal form that did not exist in 1976 when Rainbow originally incorporated). Then in 1992 the store decided to begin looking for a new space. It was four years in the making: locating a space, negotiating a sale, coming up with a design, and finishing construction.

One major factor that helped Rainbow in its move to Folsom Street location was the ability to get a bank loan with backing from the city of San Francisco. The city guaranteed the bank loan in part because Rainbow would be creating jobs and because Rainbow was moving into a then economically depressed neighborhood, an Enterprise Zone designated for economic development funding. The city also lent Rainbow $400,000 in addition to backing the bank loan.

In order to carry off the planning and growth involved in this move, Rainbow undertook further organizational refinement. As part of the move, the Grocery and General Store divisions were dissolved and Rainbow divided into Departments as its basic units; Joint Meetings between the divisions were replaced by Membership Meetings for all worker/owners. The Membership Meeting created an elected Storewide Steering Committee to help coordinate the Departments and overall day-to-day operations, hoping to free the board of directors to focus on the larger financial/legal issues and long-term planning.

All the planning and hard work came to fruition with the opening at 1745 Folsom Street on April 25, 1996. As with the previous move, sales skyrocketed. The financial success allowed an increase in wages and benefits as well as "patronage" distributions to worker/owners in keeping with the new cooperative legal structure. The work force, hovering around 80–100 workers in the final years at Mission Street, doubled in the years following the move.

In 2023, the musician and animal rights activist, Moby, stated that he has shopped at Rainbow Grocery every time he has visited San Francisco since 1990."

== See also ==
- List of food cooperatives
