= Dublin Food Co-op =

Wholefoods consumer food cooperative in Dublin 8

Coordinates: 53.3423451°N 6.3101959°W

Dublin Food Co-operative Society Limited
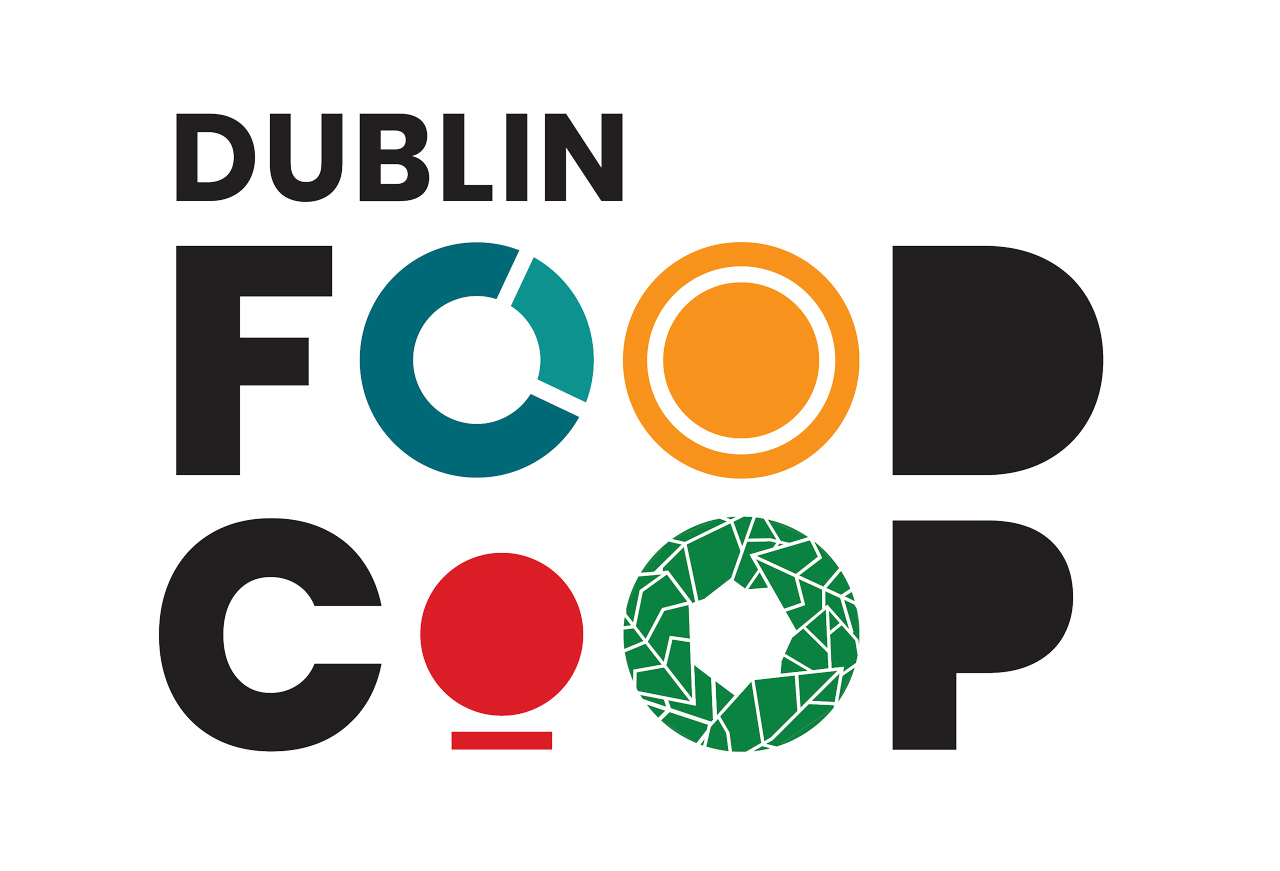
- Type: Consumers' cooperative
- Founded: 1983
- Headquarters: Dublin, Ireland
- Products: Organic wholefoods, sustainable personal care and household products
- Website: dublinfood.coop

Dublin Food Co-operative Society Limited is a consumers' cooperative based in Kilmainham, Dublin. It was founded in 1983 and focuses on organic and wholefood products. The co-operative is part of the international co-operative movement. According to its website, it is Ireland's longest-running and largest community-owned consumer co-operative, with more than 2,500 members and 18 staff.

== History ==
=== Origins (1983–1987) ===
The co-operative grew out of a campaign against the proposed nuclear power plant at Carnsore Point in County Wexford. In 1983 some of the campaigners met to form an organisation through which members could "shop in an ecologically sound way" and "promote the rational use of the earth's resources". The first step was a buying club for the collective purchase of wholefoods. On one Saturday a month, members collected pre-ordered goods from a succession of locations in Temple Bar and socialised. In 1986 some members who were also producers began selling fresh organic produce at these Saturday events.

=== Pearse Street (1987–2007) ===
In 1987 the co-operative rented the hall at St. Andrew's Resource Centre on Pearse Street, Dublin 2, every second Saturday, and it moved from monthly to fortnightly collections. This venue was its base for two decades. The co-operative was formally incorporated under the Industrial and Provident Society Acts 1893–1978 in February 1991. In 1995 it stopped taking only pre-orders, began stocking goods for general purchase, and moved to weekly trading.

Concerns about the limits of the Pearse Street premises recurred through the 1990s and early 2000s. The co-operative explored alternatives, and in 2007 it obtained planning permission and signed a lease on full-time premises at Newmarket, west of the city centre near St. Patrick's Cathedral.

Many members and local shoppers wanted to keep shopping at St. Andrew's. One of them started a Saturday market for dry goods and producers, The Super Natural Food Market, which began as a weekly event in August 2007, the month after the co-operative left.

=== Newmarket (2007–2018) ===
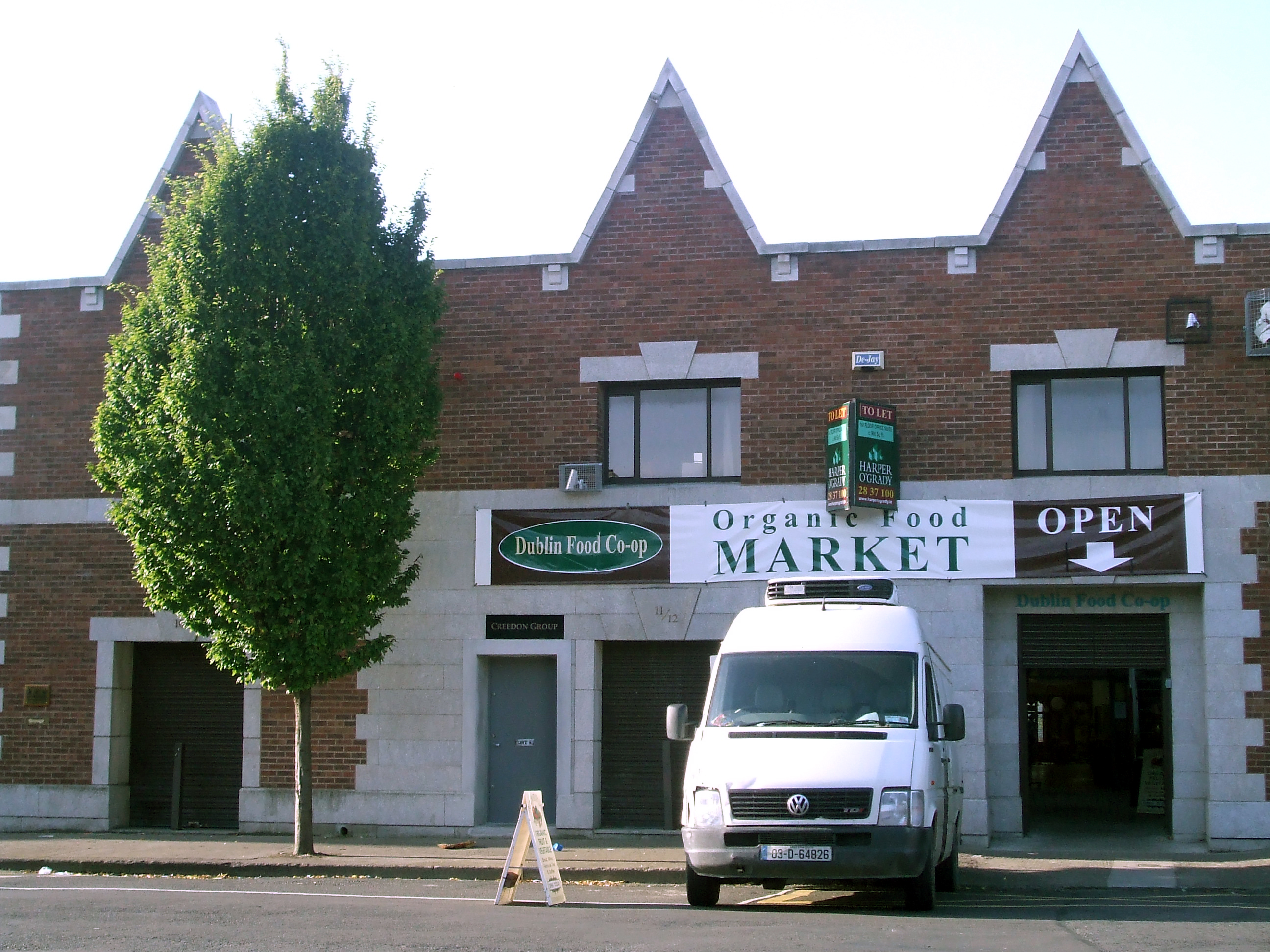
The former Dublin Food Co-op building at 12 Newmarket, Dublin 8

In July 2007 the co-operative moved to a large former warehouse at 12 Newmarket, Dublin 8, and added Thursday trading from September. It was formally opened in October 2007 by the then Minister for the Environment, John Gormley, during National Organic Week.

The hall was also available for hire and hosted regular events, including the monthly Dublin Flea Market, Fusion Market and Newmarket Brocante, as well as the annual Independents Day. A new five-year lease was signed in April 2013. Over time the co-operative relied less on market traders and sourced fresh produce directly on behalf of members. The hall was closed because of structural problems at a time when the building was already earmarked for redevelopment, and the co-operative's finances became precarious.

=== Kilmainham (2018–present) ===
In September 2018 the co-operative bought permanent premises in Kilmainham Square, Dublin 8. Members played a major part in funding the move, raising €60,000 through a "Help Us Grow" campaign, alongside money from Community Finance Ireland. The new shop opened on 10 November 2018. Unlike Newmarket, it has no community space, but nearby venues host related activities.

== Activities ==
Most of the food sold is organic, with emphasis on fair trade and environmentally friendly produce. The fit-out of the Kilmainham shop focused on sustainability and zero waste.

Membership gives a discount on purchases. The co-operative's social media lists discounts of 5–25%, depending on membership level and volunteering.

Membership grew after the move to Kilmainham and stood at 2,870 in April 2019. In 2023 the co-operative raised its membership fee for the first time in six years.

== Distinctiveness ==
A 2009 academic study called the co-operative "distinctive on the Irish scene" because of its structure. At that time it was one of only two Irish wholefood retailers organised as co-operatives, and the only one that was a consumers' cooperative. The other, the Quay Co-op in Cork, was a workers' cooperative. The study also found that the co-operative used "a different pricing structure to conventional businesses, only adding the margin needed to cover its operating expenses".

The Urban Co-op in Limerick later became another consumer food co-operative in Ireland, after starting as a buying club in 2013.

== See also ==
- List of food cooperatives
