= Boise Co-op =

American food cooperative

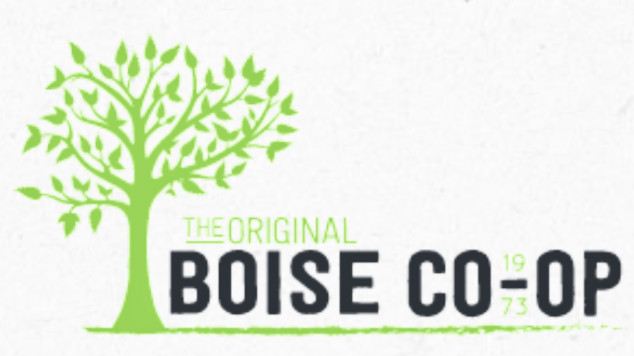

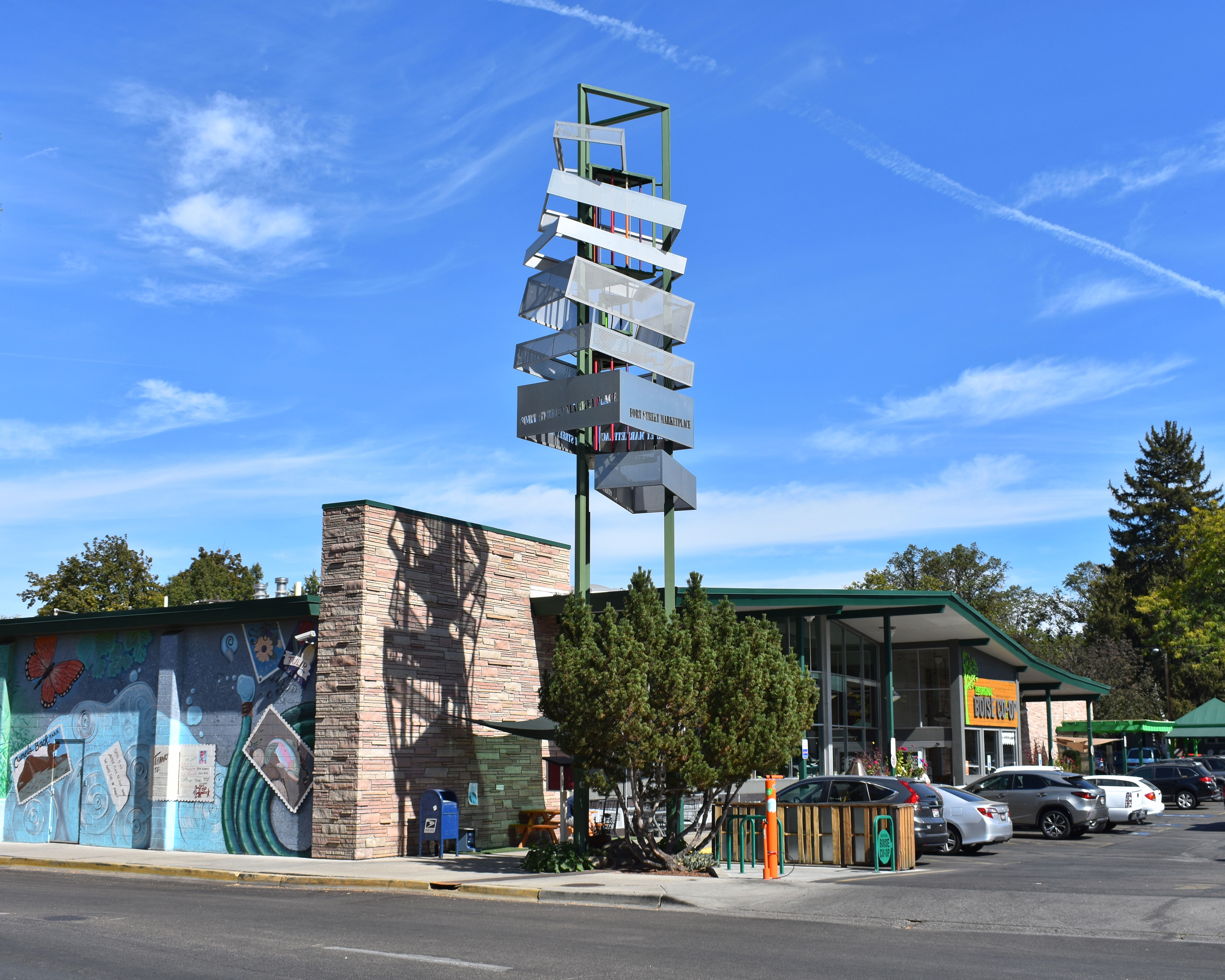
- Formerly: Boise Food Co-op; Boise Consumers' Cooperative
- Type: Food cooperative
- Industry: Grocery
- Founded: 1973
- Headquarters: 888 W Fort Street, Boise, Idaho, USA
- Number of locations: 2
- Area served: Boise metropolitan area
- Key people: Ben Kuzma, general manager
- Website: www.boise.coop

Boise Co-op is a food cooperative founded in 1973 in Boise, Idaho, featuring natural foods from over 180 local and regional food producers. Since 2011 the cooperative has adapted to compete with Whole Foods Market and Natural Grocers in the Boise metropolitan area.

== History ==
The Boise Consumers' Cooperative was founded in April, 1973, as an organization of consumers who wanted to buy produce and bulk food items at wholesale prices. The co-op received a grant of $2000 from El-Ada, a southern Idaho advocacy group that also provided the original storage and distribution space for the startup. El-Ada was funded with a grant from the Office of Economic Opportunity. Gene Drabinski, an El-Ada community organizer, articulated the co-op strategy as having "no salaries, no manager, no secretaries. Everybody will share the load." The co-op elected a board of seven directors in May, 1973, and among the board members was Ken Kavanaugh, later the co-op's general manager. At the time, 65 families had joined the co-op.

Soon the co-op moved to 1743 Broadway Avenue in Boise, a location near El-Ada headquarters, and in 1975 the 200-member organization moved to 1515 North 13th Street in Boise's Hyde Park neighborhood. Members were asked to donate one hour per month to help with bulk food transportation and packaging. Grocery items included produce, dairy, grains, and canned goods. Most of the members were vegetarians, and meat was not offered in the store.

The co-op moved in 1984 to a shopping area at Hill Road and Harrison Street, and in 1995 it moved into its current 26,000 square foot location at 888 West Fort Street.

An early supporter of Idaho Power's green power program, the co-op installed skylights in its store to reduce demand for electricity, and it rerouted energy discharged by refrigeration compressors to its hot water tanks.

In 2005, the co-op opened FlipSide Cafe near its store on Fort Street, but the restaurant was not profitable, and it closed within two years. Then in 2007 the co-op wine shop opened, and in 2012 the co-op pet shop opened, both across from the main store on Fort Street.

Following the departure of general manager, Ken Kavanaugh, employees unsuccessfully attempted to unionize.

Boise Co-op opened a second location in Meridian in November, 2015. Sales revenue was lower than expected at the new store, and the co-op laid off 18 employees the following January. Six employees at the Fort Street location also were laid off, and layoffs amounted to nine percent of total workforce.

== Annual Report ==
Boise Co-op has published its financial information for the past few years on its website. In 2018 the co-op counted over 31,000 members, including almost 3500 new members. Total assets were over $10 million, and sales for the year were almost $40 million with net income slightly over $800,000. Sales increased 11 percent over the year 2017. Nearly 19 percent of its 235 employees had been with the co-op for over 10 years. The co-op donated over $33,000 to 80 charities, and it conducted 65 workshops, classes, and tours.

== Salmonella outbreak ==
In 2015, approximately 250 cases of salmonella poisoning were traced to food served at the co-op's deli. Weeks later, health inspectors again found violations at the deli and in the co-op's produce department.

== See also ==
- List of food cooperatives
