= List of food cooperatives =

The following is a list of food cooperative grocery stores and buyers groups, current and defunct. Many of the second-wave food cooperatives formed in the 1960s and 1970s started as buying clubs.

This list is not exhaustive, and is limited to notable food cooperatives.

== Australia ==
- Blue Mountains Food Co-operative, Katoomba, NSW
- Alfalfa House, Enmore, Sydney

== Belgium ==
- Bees Coop, Brussels
- Coop Centraal, Antwerp

== Canada ==
- Karma Co-op (Toronto, Ontario): One of Canada's oldest food co-ops, it focuses on local, sustainable, and organic foods.
- Kootenay Co-op (Nelson, British Columbia): A member-owned co-op known for natural and organic foods.
- East End Food Co-op (Vancouver, British Columbia): A community-focused store offering local and fairly traded products.
- Ottawa Valley Food Co-op (Ottawa, Ontario region): An online co-op that supports local farmers and producers.
- Co-op Atlantic (Eastern Canada): While some of these stores have changed over time, they originally had a strong co-op tradition, linking consumers and producers.

== France ==
- La Louve, Paris
- Superquinquin, Lille
- La Cagette, Montpellier

== Germany ==
- FoodHub, Munich
- SuperCoop, Berlin
- köllektiv eG, Cologne

== Ireland ==
- Dublin Food Co-op, Dublin City
- The Urban Co-op, Limerick

== Poland ==
- Wawelska Kooperatywa Spożywcza, Kraków
- Kooperatywa Dobrze, Warszawa
- Beskidzka Paczka, Bielsko-Biała
- Jurajska Kooperatywa Spożywcza, Częstochowa
- Tomata (kooperatywa spożywcza), Gliwice
- Wiejska Kooperatywa Spożywcza, Beskid Niski
- Kaszubska Kooperatywa Spożywcza, Bytów
- Kooperatywa Nasza, Lesznowola
- Lubelska Kooperatywa Naturalnie, Lublin
- Kooperatywa Lublin, Lublin
- Sądecka Kooperatywa Spożywcza, Nowy Sącz
- Kooperatywa Konstancin, Piaseczno / Konstancin
- Kooperatywa Poznańska, Poznań
- Kooperatywa Jeżyce, Poznań
- Kooperatywa Południowa, Warszawa
- Kooperatywa Grochowska, Warszawa

== Sweden ==
- Coop Sweden (Coop Sverige), a subsidiary of Kooperativa Förbundet
- Kvinnornas Andelsförening Svenska Hem, women's food cooperative, founded in Sweden 1905.

== Switzerland ==
- Coop Switzerland
- Migros

== Turkey ==
- The Agricultural Credit Cooperatives of Turkey

== United Kingdom ==
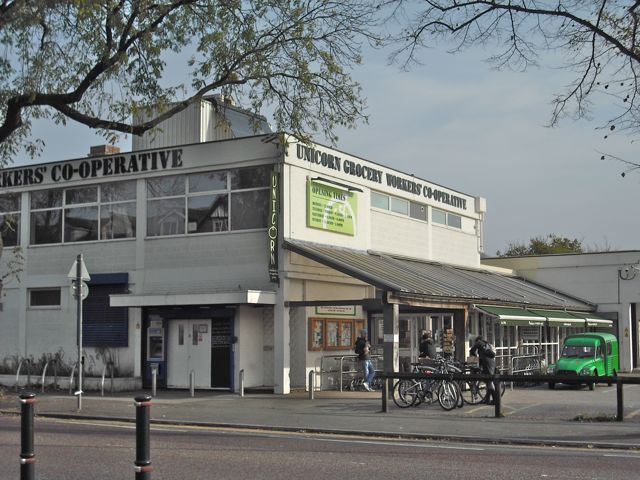
Unicorn Grocery

- Daily Bread Co-operative, Northampton and Cambridge
- Essential Trading Co-op, Bristol
- Infinity Foods Workers Co-operative, Brighton
- The People's Supermarket, London
- Unicorn Grocery, Manchester

== United States ==
=== General ===
- 4th Street Food Co-op, New York City
- Berkshire Food Co-op, Massachusetts
- Boise Co-op, Boise, Idaho
- Bushwick Food Co-op, Brooklyn
- Central Brooklyn Food Co-op, Brooklyn
- Central Co-op, Seattle, Washington
- Fiddleheads Food Cooperative, New London, Connecticut
- Frontier Natural Products Co-op, Norway, Iowa
- George Street Co-op, New Brunswick, New Jersey
- Good Foods Co-op, Lexington, Kentucky
- La Montañita Food Co-op, New Mexico
- Maryland Food Collective at the University of Maryland, College Park, Maryland
- Mariposa Food Co-op, West Philadelphia, Pennsylvania
- Mountain Avenue Market, Fort Collins, Colorado
- New Pioneer Food Co-op, Iowa City, Iowa
- North Coast Cooperative, Humboldt County, California
- Ocean Beach People's Organic Food Market in Ocean Beach, San Diego
- Olympia Food Co-op, Olympia, Washington
- Outpost Natural Foods, Milwaukee; Bay View, Milwaukee; Mequon, Wisconsin; and Wauwatosa, Wisconsin
- Park Slope Food Coop, Brooklyn
- PCC Community Markets (formerly branded as Puget Consumers Co-op and PCC Natural Markets), Seattle, Washington
- People's Food Co-op, Portland, Oregon
- Phat Beets Produce, Oakland, California
- Rainbow Grocery Cooperative, San Francisco
- Skagit Valley Food Co-op, Mount Vernon, Washington
- Sugar Beet Food Coop, Oak Park, IL
- Three Rivers Market, Knoxville, Tennessee
- Wedge Community Co-op, Minneapolis, Minnesota
- West Oakland Food Collaborative, Oakland
- Wheatsville Co-op, Austin, Texas
- Whole Foods Co-op, Duluth, Minnesota
- Willy Street Cooperative, Madison, Wisconsin
- Ypsilanti Food Co-op, Ypsilanti, Michigan

=== Student-run ===
- ASUW Student Food Co-op, Seattle, Washington
- Berkeley Student Food Collective, Berkeley, California
- Oberlin Student Cooperative Association – a housing cooperative and food cooperative in Oberlin, Ohio

=== Defunct ===
- Citizens Co-op, Gainesville, Florida
- Consumers' Cooperative of Berkeley, Berkeley
- The Cooperative Grocery, Emeryville, California
- District Grocery Stores – a former cooperative of small single-room grocery stores in Washington, D.C., Maryland and Northern Virginia that operated from 1921 to 1972.
- Harvest Markets, Jamaica Plain and Cambridge, Massachusetts. In operation from 1974 through 2018

== See also ==
- History of the cooperative movement
- List of food companies
- List of cooperatives
- National Co+op Grocers
