= Consumers' Cooperative of Berkeley =

Berkeley Co-op logo, as reproduced on a belt buckle, c. 1970s

Consumers' Cooperative of Berkeley, informally known as the Berkeley Co-op, or simply Co-op, was a consumers' cooperative based in Berkeley, California, which operated from 1939 to 1988, when it collapsed due to internal governance disputes and bankruptcy. At its height, it was the largest cooperative of its kind in North America, with over 100,000 members, and its collapse has provoked intense discussion over how food cooperatives should be operated.

The CCB evolved out of the Berkeley Buyers' Club, formed in the midst of the Great Depression on January 27, 1936, by a small group of families active in Upton Sinclair's EPIC and local Democratic Party clubs. In the beginning the co-op operated out of the basement of the parsonage of a local Methodist minister in Alameda, Roy Wilson, in cooperation with another buyers' club formed seven weeks earlier in Oakland, California. In April 1937 sixty families in the local clubs joined forces to open the CCB's first store at 2491 Shattuck Avenue (at Dwight Way).

By the end of 1937 the store had moved into larger premises on University Avenue, and by 1939 the co-op had grown to 225 families, with sales of $700 a week. In 1957 it was the second largest urban cooperative in the United States, with 6,000 member families, and by 1963 there were 30,000 families enrolled and several stores in operation.

During the 1960s there were a series of hotly contested elections to the co-op board, in which a politically left opposition faction represented by board member Robert Treuhaft ran its independent slate of candidates in opposition to the "official" slate. This faction held a brief-lived majority on the board in 1969. The de facto division of the co-op board into two parties continued until the end, with many issues narrowly decided on a 5–4 vote.

The co-op, which at one point was operating 12 supermarkets with $83 million in sales, began closing locations and selling off co-op property in the 1970s. The co-op's final demise in 1988 has been attributed to a number of factors, including too rapid expansion, political infighting over issues like consumer boycotts, and the board's failure to negotiate concessions from its employees' union during its decline.

The Berkeley Co-op purchased much of its inventory from National Cooperatives, which used the CO-OP label, commonly seen on much of the stock at the stores.

== Stores ==
- 1414 University Avenue (at Acton Street): Until the early 1960s, this was the only Co-op. It consisted of two buildings, one housing the grocery, the other a hardware store. For a time, the grocery included a child care facility called the "Kiddie Korral." The grocery was bought and operated by Andronico's until that chain went bankrupt in 2011. In November 2013, the old grocery re-opened for a time as a non-grocery Savers Thrift Store. Target subsequently acquired the building and opened a new store there in the Fall of 2017. The adjacent building that was the site of the hardware store now houses several small businesses.
- 1550 Shattuck Avenue (at Cedar Street): currently the site of an Andronico‘s Community Market. This Co-op opened in the early 1960s in a newly constructed building. Also located in the same building was the Books Unlimited bookstore and the Co-op Credit Union, which still exists but at another site. In the mid 1960s, the Co-op Hardware store moved from its previous site adjacent to the University Avenue Co-op grocery to a site kitty corner from the Shattuck Co-op grocery. This site is presently a Benchmark Climbing bouldering gym.
- 3000 Telegraph Avenue (at Ashby Avenue): opened in the early 1960s in a building formerly owned by Sid's, also a grocery. For a time, two concessions continued operating within the store; one was a Winchell's Donuts outlet, the other a barbecue chicken vendor, "Chef Mandels". On the corner of the parking lot was another concession, a small florist shop which still operates. Whole Foods is the current proprietor of the grocery.
- El Cerrito, 1751 Eastshore Blvd; the site became an Orchard Supply Hardware store, but was closed in 2014 and is currently vacant.
- Castro Valley, 3667 Castro Valley Blvd.
- 1510 Geary Road, Walnut Creek/Pleasant Hill
- Corte Madera, Marin (also the location that was robbed by, and staff held hostage by the SLA in 1972)
- San Francisco: in the Northpoint Center on Bay Street near Fisherman's Wharf.
- Co-op Garage: at the southwest corner of University Avenue and Sacramento Street near the University Avenue grocery.
- Oakland: MacArthur Broadway Shopping Center (MacArthur at Broadway). Location originally a Mayfair supermarket, acquired by Co-op when Mayfair chain closed. Entire shopping center was demolished about 2010. Now the principal site of Oakland Kaiser Hospital.
- Oakland: 5730 Telegraph Ave. Also previously a Mayfair supermarket. Building is now a satellite location of Alta Bates Hospital, providing inter alia diagnostic imaging and perinatal services.
- Warehouse: located in Richmond, not directly owned by the Berkeley Co-op, but by Associated Cooperatives, Inc., a regional wholesaler of which the Berkeley Co-op was a member. The demise of the Berkeley Co-op played a major role in the eventual demise of Associated Cooperatives, Inc.

== See also ==
- The Cooperative Grocery
- Cheese Board Collective
- Berkeley Student Food Collective
- Berkeley Student Cooperative
- List of food cooperatives
