= The Cooperative Grocery =

Coordinates: 37°50′56.17″N 122°17′32.54″W

The Cooperative Grocery or The CoG was a consumers' food cooperative in Emeryville, California. The cooperative opened its doors in November 2007 and closed on October 31, 2010. The cooperative included an online store accessible from its website.

== History ==
In its planning period, the business was also known as the Berkeley Cooperative Grocery or Berkeley CoG. Once the storefront-warehouse was located at 1450 67th Street in Emeryville, the business name was changed to The Cooperative Grocery.

== Membership ==
The Cooperative Grocery was a worker/member coop in which all shoppers must also be members. Members worked 2.5 hours every four weeks. There was no paid staff. The cooperative was based on the model of the Park Slope Food Coop in Brooklyn.

Members paid a $25 joining fee and a $100 investment that paid for increasing stock. The investment was refundable when a member leaves; the joining fee was not.

== Closing ==
Upon closing, the balance of money owed vs money in the bank was such that members did not receive a refund on their investment.

== See also ==
- List of food cooperatives
