= Alfalfa House =

Coordinates: 33°53′54.82″S 151°10′26.52″E

- Fresh fruit window display above the Herbs and Spices section
- Company type: Food cooperative
- Industry: Grocery retailing
- Founded: 1988
- Headquarters: Enmore, Sydney, Australia
- Products: Whole foods, organic food
- Website: alfalfahouse.org

Alfalfa House Community Food Cooperative Ltd is a not-for-profit food cooperative in Enmore, Sydney, Australia. It is a registered cooperative. Alfalfa House began in the front room of a terraced house in Erskineville in 1981.

According to its introductory material for new members, the main aim of the cooperative is to provide minimally-packaged and minimally-processed organic food and low-impact common household products, processed in ways that minimise harm to both people and the environment.

== Policy ==
Alfalfa House is managed by a board of directors, the Members' Council, elected at the cooperative's Annual General Meeting. The council oversees the financial management and general ongoing policy-making of the co-op. According to its Rules of Incorporation, any financial surpluses are to be re-invested in the co-op to improve services to the membership.

== Objectives ==
According to its Rules of Incorporation, Alfalfa House aims to

- provide a retail source of wholefoods so that members may have some control over the sources of their food supply
- provide information on and promote the use of: low-cost, ethically-produced and packaged wholefoods; cruelty-free foods; vegetarian foods; vegan foods; organic foods; and genetically modified-free foods
- run an ethical, not-for-profit business
- minimise resource wastage and, hence, encourage reuse and recycling
- support other cooperatives whose objectives are similar or related to the objectives of the cooperative
- stimulate community development, foster community spirit and promote sustainable living

== See also ==
- List of food cooperatives
