= 4th Street Food Co-op =

Food cooperative in New York City

Coordinates: 40°43′39.36″N 73°59′32.59″W

- Company type: Consumers' cooperative
- Founded: 1995
- Headquarters: New York City, New York, United States
- Products: Natural food
- Members: 300
- Website: 4thstreetfoodcoop.org

The 4th Street Food Co-op is a food cooperative located in New York City. The 4th Street Food Co-op runs a retail store at 58 East 4th Street, selling natural foods and household products. The co-op is member-owned and -operated, but open to the public, and focuses on offering locally grown organic, and ethically produced products.

== History ==
The 4th Street Food Co-op is in the space formerly occupied by the Good Food Co-op that started in 1973 as a buying club and later opened a storefront, going out of business in 1992. In 1995 the Good Food Co-op was replaced by the 4th Street Food Co-op under the legal corporate name Good Harvest Cooperative, Incorporated.

== Offerings ==
The store offers a variety of items in bulk such as grains (spelt, corn meal, bulgur), dried beans, raw and roasted nuts, oils, vinegars, and spices. Zero waste shopping is encouraged, and brown paper bags and bioplastic bags are available for a small fee. Fresh produce and packaged products are also sold. The store also carries a variety of dairy-, wheat-, and gluten-free goods and organic cleaning products.

== Structure and governance ==
=== Membership ===
The 4th Street Food Co-op is lower Manhattan's only food cooperative.

Monthly meetings are held, open to all members, where working groups report on the state of the co-op and progress made towards projects and goals. Additionally, members may submit and vote on proposals such as reevaluating pricing and discounts, deciding marketing strategy, and organizing upcoming community and store events. Additionally, a large annual meeting is held to discuss major co-op decisions and review the past year.

There are several forms of membership, roughly divided into working and non-working. Working members can work 2.25 hours per week either in-store or as part of a working group and receive a 20% discount on all store purchases, or share such a membership for a 15% discount. The annual fee to be a working member is currently $48. Non-working members do not work, but pay a $60 annual membership fee for 8% off all purchases.

=== Working groups ===
Responsibilities in addition to staffing the store during opening hours are divided into 12 working groups, such as information systems, facilities maintenance, marketing, and an ethics committee.

== See also ==
- List of food cooperatives
