= District Grocery Stores =

District Grocery Stores (DGS)
- Type: Cooperative
- Industry: Grocery
- Founded: 1921 in Washington, DC
- Founders: William M. Hornstein
- Defunct: 1972
- Headquarters: Washington, DC,
- Area served: Washington, DC, Maryland, Northern Virginia

District Grocery Stores (DGS) was a cooperative of small single-room grocery stores in Washington, DC, Maryland and Northern Virginia. It operated from 1921 to 1972. The goal was to leverage the volume of purchasing power of the cooperative to negotiate better prices from wholesalers and therefore improve their competitiveness. The cooperative started with 20 members and grew to 300 members at its peak, most of whom were Jewish immigrant families from Europe. The stores were located across the Washington metropolitan area.

== Partnership and business model ==
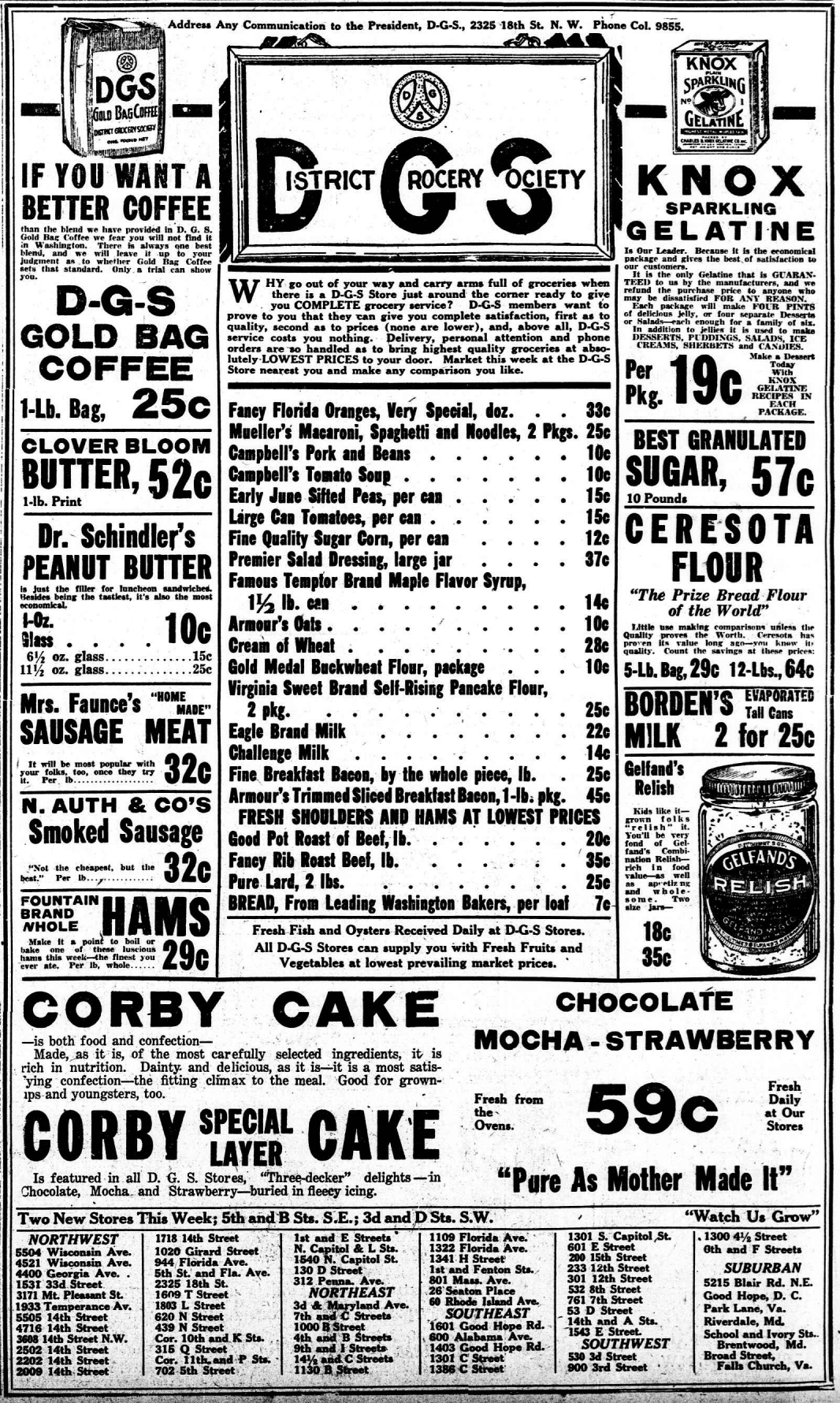
DGS ad in the Evening Star, November 11, 1921 - First logo

The District Grocery Society started in 1921 with 20 members. Meeting in Mike Hornstein's store, these store owners organized a cooperative organization to stop declining sales and avoid closure of their stores. The cooperative was originally named District Grocery Society, as visible in its early advertisements. In 1928, the name was changed to District Grocery Stores while retaining the same initials, D.G.S.

Its early motto was "The Grocery Chain of Personal Owners" and later became "The Owner is Your Neighbor". Several version of the logo were used over the years in the various advertisement published in the local newspapers. By the 1960s, many of the stores in the area used a distinctive orange and green sign.

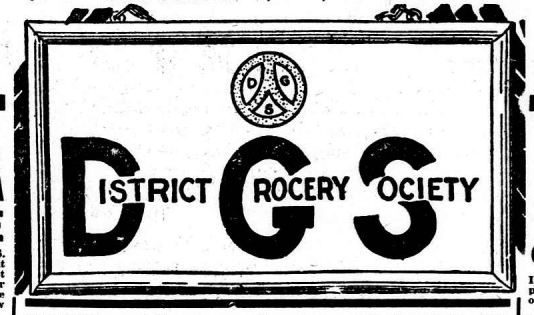
District Grocery Society Logo (1921)

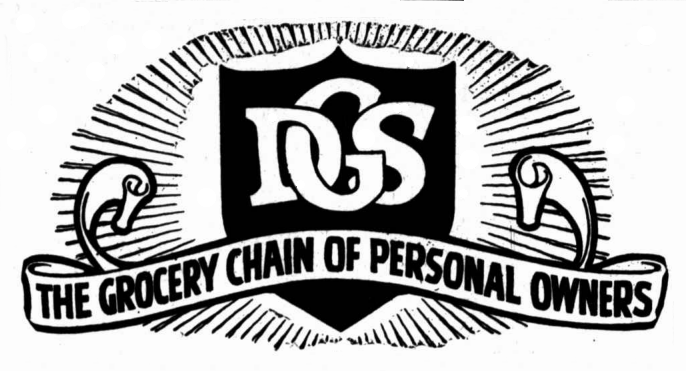
District Grocery Society Logo (1922)

District Grocery Stores Logo (1930s)

District Grocery Stores Logo (1940s and early 1950s)

District Grocery Stores Logo (Late 1950s)

The membership fee to join was $2,500, and the distance between other members' stores could not be less than two city blocks. In exchange, the members would be able to buy goods at cost from the cooperative and leverage the advertising campaigns the cooperative was running in the local newspapers. When the number of members was still low, the store addresses were listed on the ad. However, as the number grew, the ads started referencing the local phone book to find the nearest DGS store.

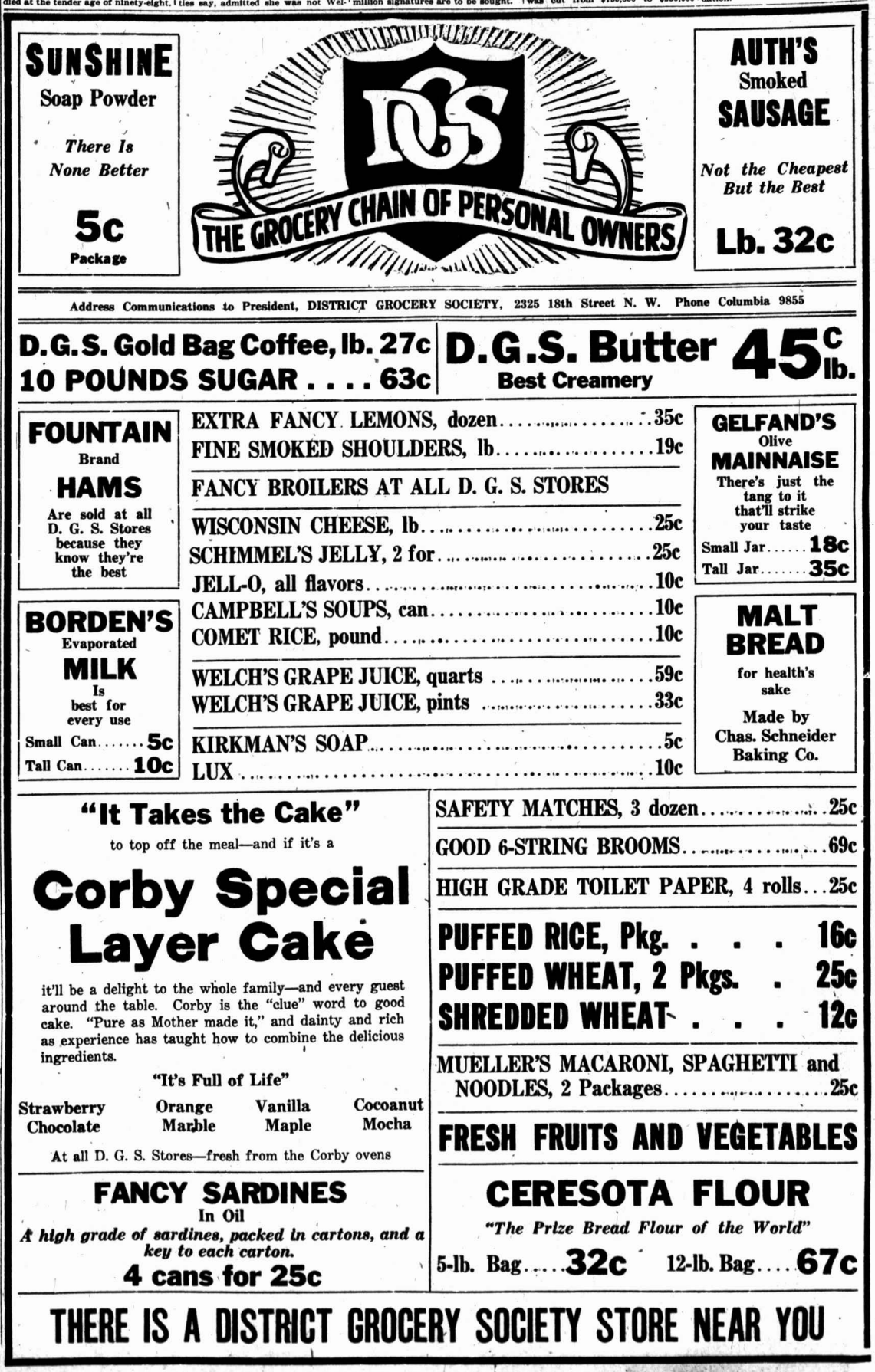
DGS ad in the Washington Times, June 13, 1922 - Second logo and motto

In 1963, it cost $6 to $20 a week (depending on sales volume) for a store to use the DGS name and sign to cover advertising costs. A store could keep its independent name if they wished while still purchasing goods at the DGS price.

Stores also offered free deliveries of groceries to their customers. The free deliveries were handled by the cooperative using its fleet of orange DGS trucks. The service was explained in ads published in newspapers, such as this one from 1954:

"Go to the D.G.S. store near your home. Make your selection of crisp, dewy fresh produce, nationally-known groceries and tender, high-quality meats, cut for your individual, specific needs. Then, "feel free and easy!" You've no problems about getting your purchases home. Your D.G.S. Grocer will be glad to send your order right to your kitchen."

— District Grocery Stores, Display Ad, Apr 9, 1954, The Washington Post, pg. 18

Most stores also offered credit as it was customary at the time to do so.

=== Independent ownership ===
The stores were not owned by the District Grocery Stores cooperative but were individually owned by independent grocers. Most stores were set up as a single room on the ground floor on the property with the family living above or behind the store. This allowed the store to remain open for very long hours and offered plenty of labor to serve the customers with children helping their parents when not in school.

The first generation often spoke Yiddish as a first language and learned English while interacting with customers and reading labels on canned goods. The second-generation was expected to help in the store but were also attending local schools where they learned English.

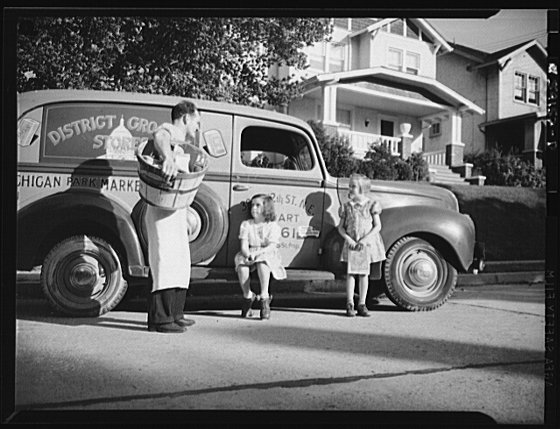
District Grocery Stores truck

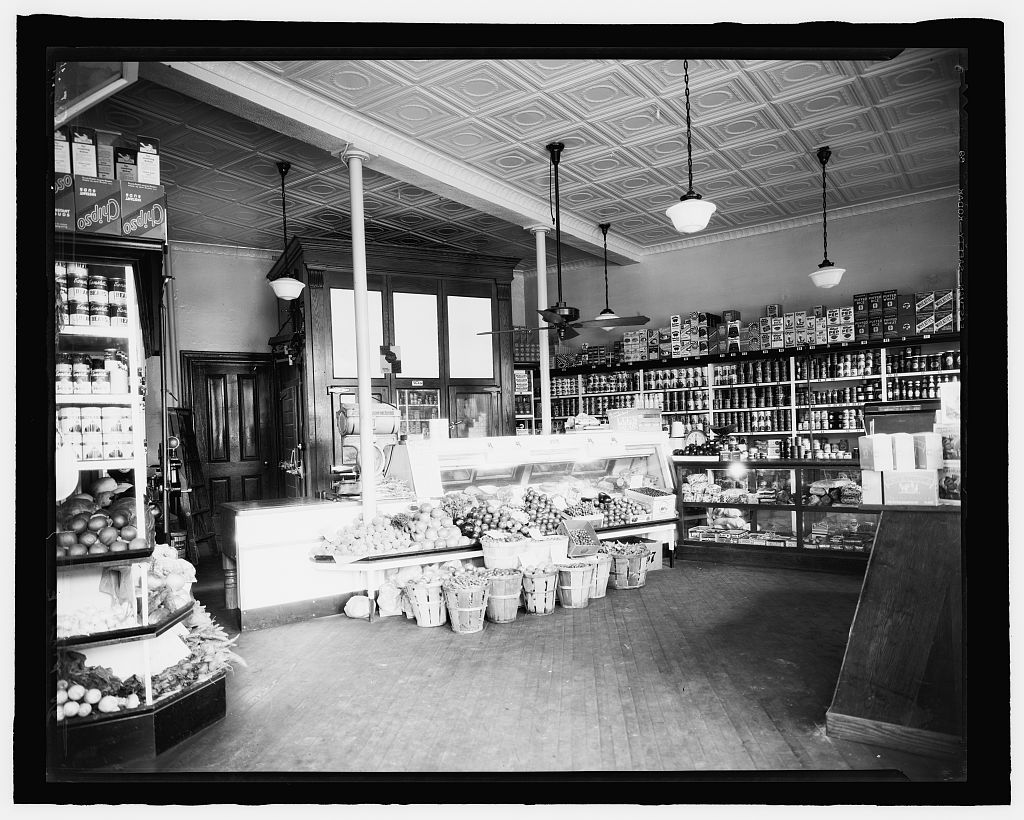
Interior of a DGS store

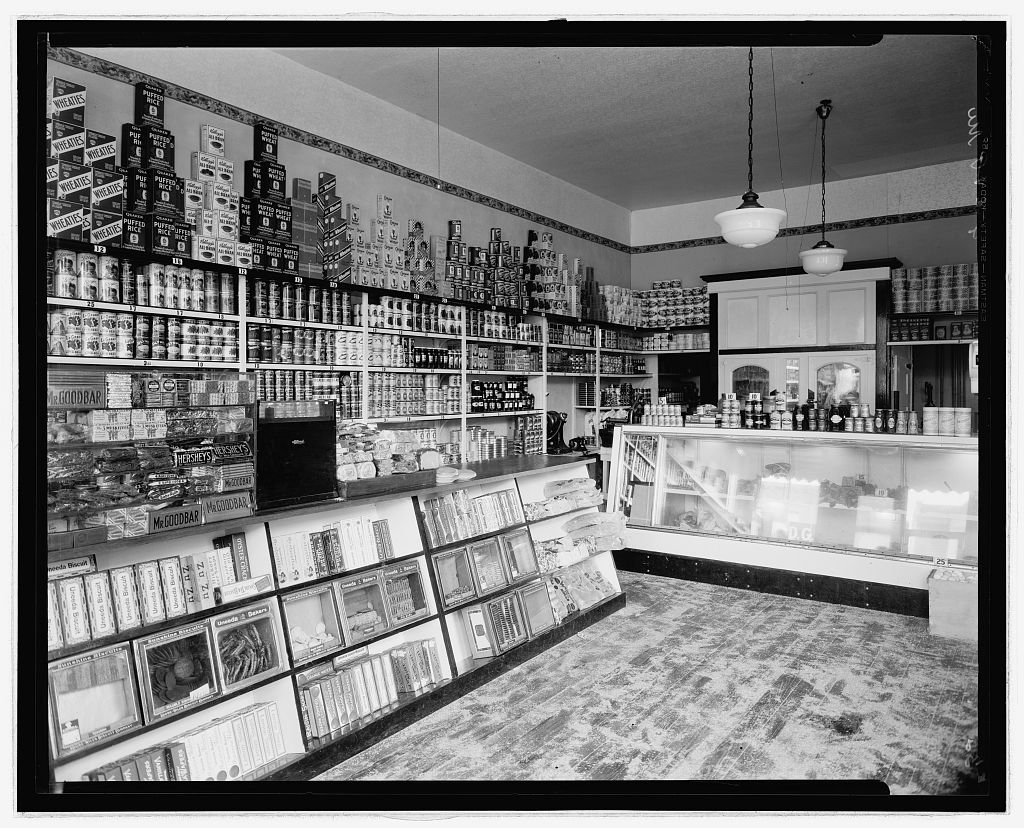
Interior of a DGS store

=== The DGS Warehouse ===
Designed and built under the leadership of Isaac Jacobson, a new warehouse opened at 4th St and D St SW in 1941 for the cooperative's 20th anniversary. This warehouse was featured prominently in several DGS ads. Build by Jeffrey-Dyer, Inc. at the cost of $750,000, it covered two city blocks (from 4th St to 6th St SW). It could handle the volume as well as the new demands of the market with its 135,000 square feet of storage.

It had a fresh meat department, frozen food, as well as banana-ripening room. DGS received several congratulations from other local businesses, including its builder.

In 1942, the warehouse provided the setting for the War Bonds performance hosted by DGS.

In 1953, DGS president Louis Fox announced a new self-serve cash and carry service, opening the DGS warehouse for the first time to non-members. By that time, the District Grocery Stores were making 14 million dollars a year.

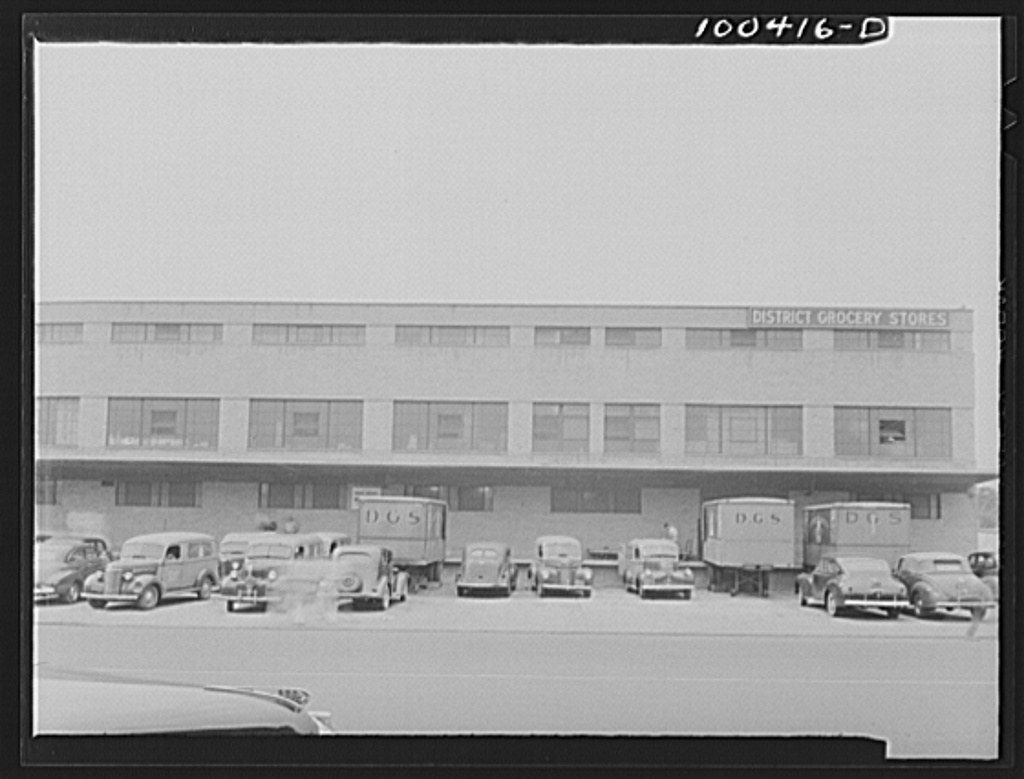
District Grocery Store warehouse on 4th Street SW

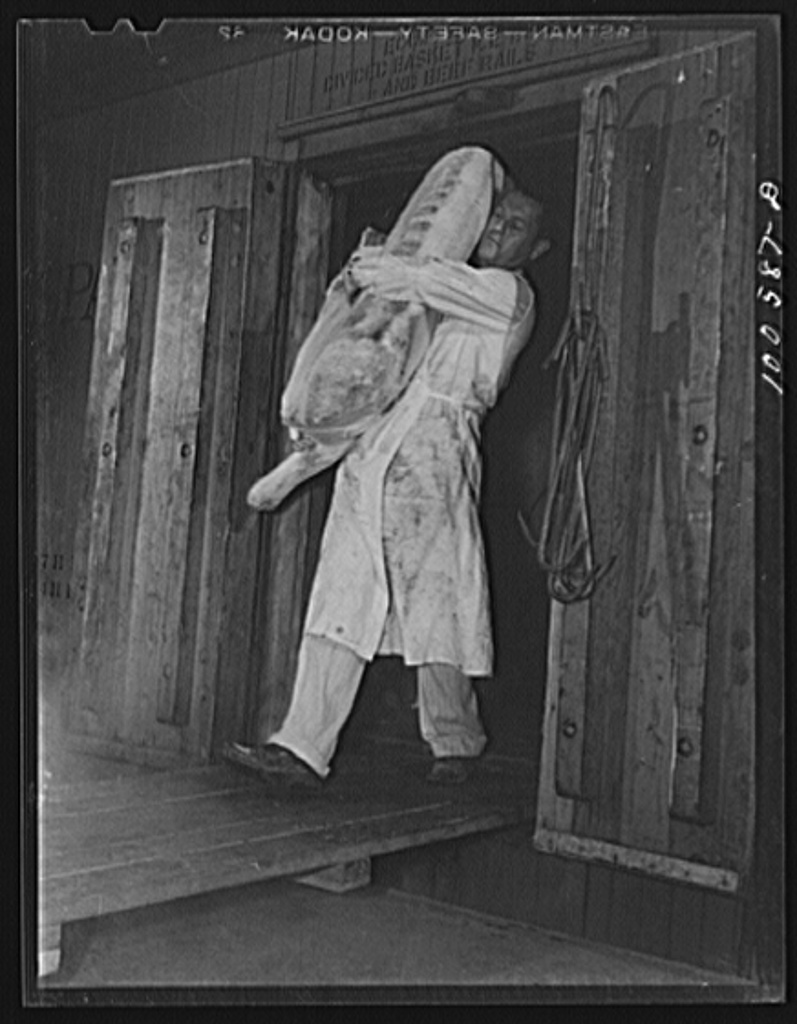
District Grocery Store warehouse – Unloading a meat train

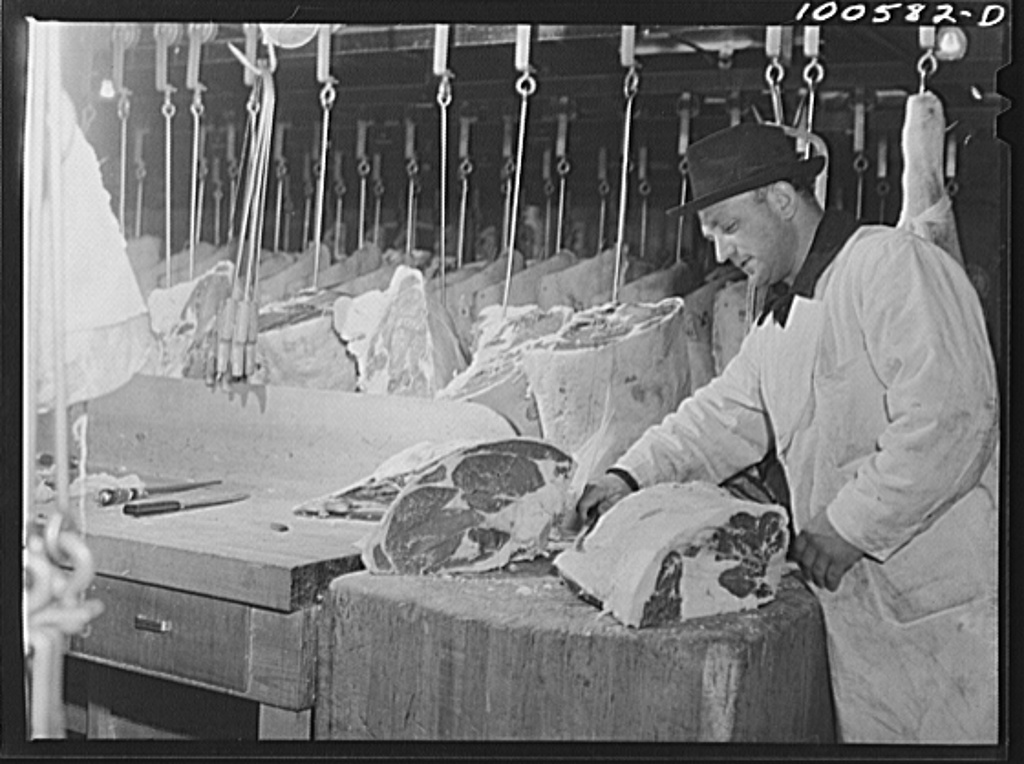
Cutting beef in the District Grocery Store warehouse

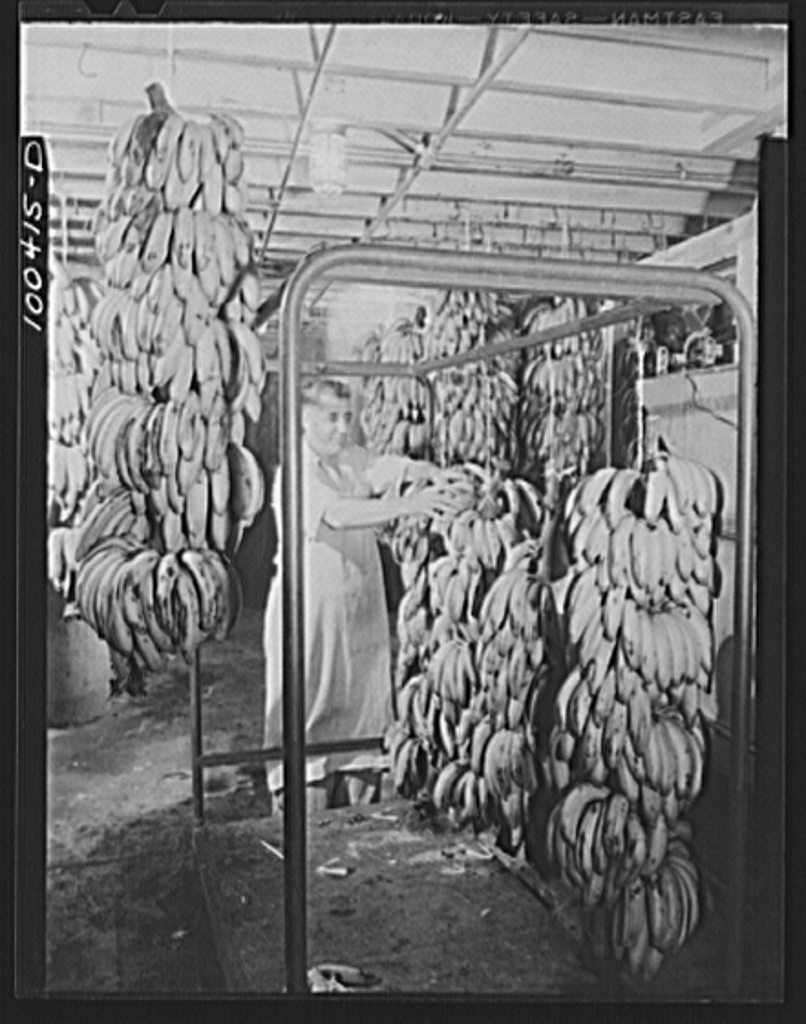
District Grocery Store warehouse – Banana-ripening room

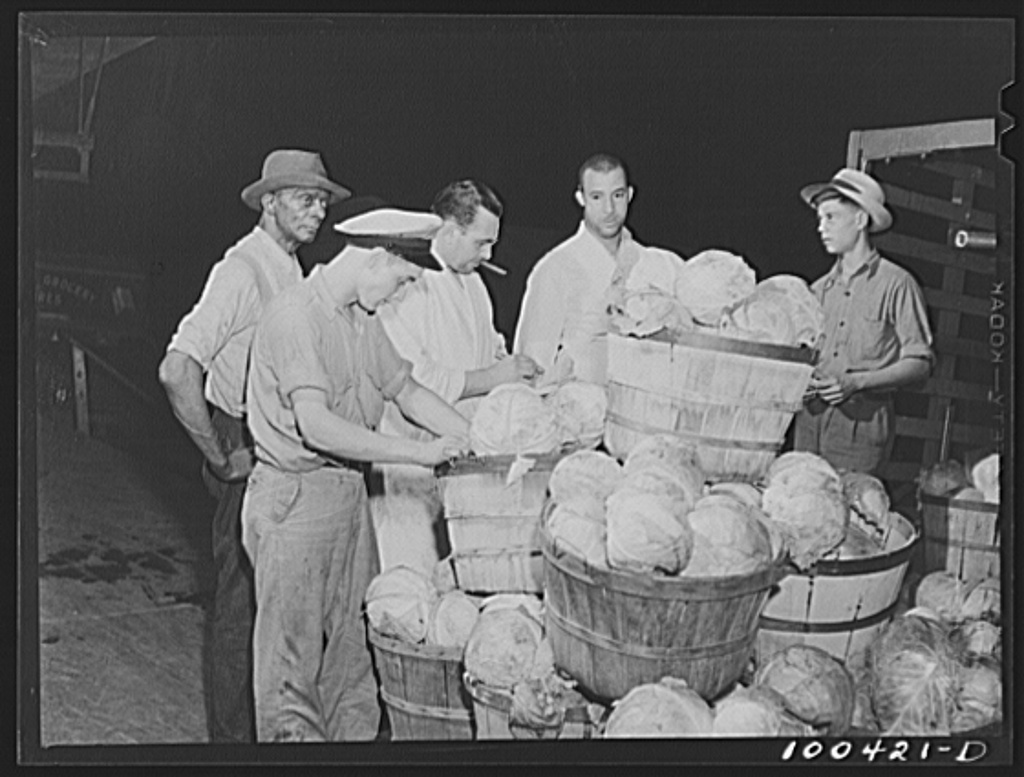
District grocery Store warehouse – Produce

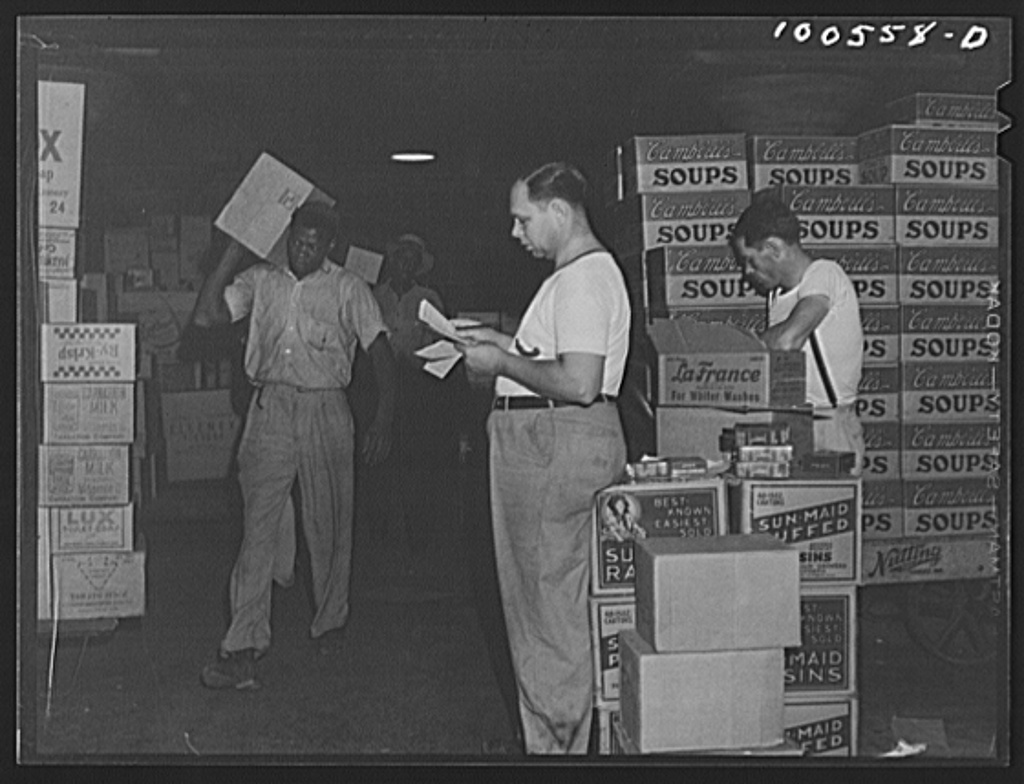
District Grocery Store warehouse – Grocery Department

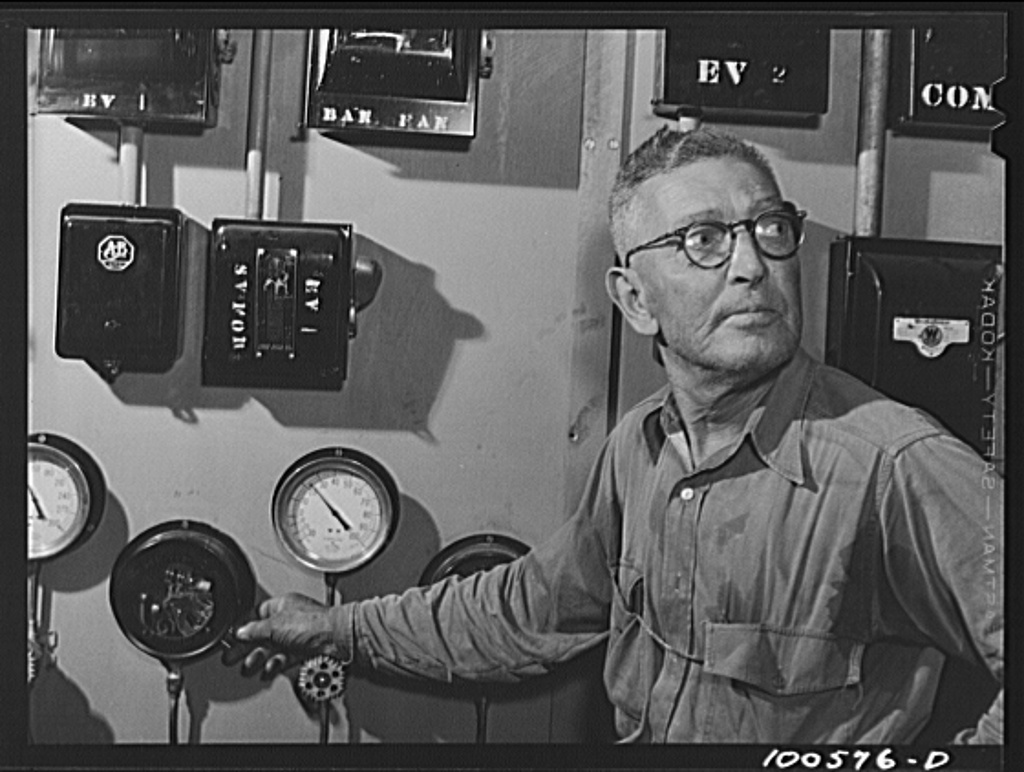
District Grocery Store warehouse – Full-time on-call engineer responsible for AC, Coldrooms, and storerooms

== Ethnicity ==
The cooperative was mainly Jewish in its membership. Between 1880 and 1924, European Jews immigrated to the United States in mass fleeing poverty and antisemitism in Europe. The already established Jewish community supported their arrival. These were often relatives or other members of the village or area in Europe.

Thousands made it to the Washington area, and the newcomers often only spoke the Yiddish language. Several hundreds of these newcomers would open these small "Mom and Pop" neighborhood grocery stores as they required only a limited start-up capital and only some English. Often, both of these resources could be acquired by becoming an apprentice in a family member's store.

There were several Yiddish newspapers available in the Washington, D.C., area, including The Forward and many store owners were very involved in the local synagogues and the life of the Jewish community. Many of these Jewish cultural centers remain today such as the Sixth & I Synagogue.

The stores were open seven days a week and were often only closed half a day on Sundays. Despite the overwhelming number of store owners being Jewish, the stores remained open on Saturdays because these stores were often located in non-Jewish neighborhoods. This made it challenging to observe the Sabbath and retain a traditional Jewish life. Some stores did close on Rosh Hashanah and Yom Kippur.

Many non-Kosher items were sold in the stores, such as pork products as these stores were catering to non-Jewish customers in the neighborhood. These items were also advertised in the local newspapers by DGS and customers expected to see them in their local grocery store.

DGS's size allowed it to oppose the antisemitism its members experienced in business and social relations by threatening to boycott food manufacturers that engaged in discriminatory practices.

== Social activities and involvement ==
Due to its size, the cooperative became a powerful social group. Many events were organized by the cooperative to allow members to socialize.

The organization supported sports such as bowling and baseball. In the 1930s and 1940s, the DGS Bowling League was organized. A team also competed in the Merchants League against other local companies such as Coca-Cola and Penn Electric Company. The District Grocery Stores Nine played in a local baseball league in the 1930s.

Starting in 1926, the annual banquets became an important part of the year for many grocers and their families around the city.

Food shows were also organized in 1932 and 1933. During those shows spread over several days, food manufactures showcased their products. Various contests with prizes were organized, such as baby beauty contests, costume contests, pie-eating contests, dance competitions, and the "Washington's most loquacious woman" competition.

During World War II, DGS aided the war effort. On April 28, 1942, the newly opened DGS warehouse hosted a show featuring George Jessel, Sophie Tucker, Imogen Carpenter and Betty Bruce, which was organized to sell War Bonds and Stamps. By that time, $500,000 in War Bonds had already been purchased by DGS's 276 members and its employees.

== Timeline ==
1921: The District Grocery Society was started in the store of Mike Hornstein located on 18th Street NW. William M. Hornstein becomes its first president.

The first warehouse was located in one of the member's basement located at 3929 13th St NW.

1926: First Annual Banquet.

1928: The District Grocery Society becomes the District Grocery Stores but retains the same initials: DGS.

1930: Issac Jacobson becomes president.

1937: Plans for a new warehouse were announced by Isaac Jacobson, president of DGS.

January 3, 1940: Isaac Jacobson is re-elected as president of the cooperative for the tenth time.

May 21, 1940: Ground Breaking for the new Warehouse by Isaac Jacobson, president of DGS.

1941: The new warehouse opened at 4th St and D St SW for the 20th anniversary of the District Grocery Stores.

January 3, 1944: Paul D. Kaufman succeeds Isaac Jacobson as president of DGS.

1949: Joseph Muchmick becomes president of DGS.

1950: Paul D. Kaufman is elected president of DGS as he was between 1944 and 1949.

1951: Louis Fox becomes president. He is the youngest president at age 33.

April 3, 1952: The District Grocery Stores elect their first female director, Sarah Smotrich (who operates Sara's Market), to a two-year term.

1953: On July 7, a new self-serve cash and carry service Later that year, the District Grocery Stores merge with United Food Stores, one of its competing cooperative.

June 1, 1955: DGS merges with Nation-Wide Food Stores, another grocers cooperative founded in 1936.

DGS was also facing competition from other cooperatives such as the United Food Stores (until they merged in 1953), the Associated Grocers of Washington, and Washington Wholesale Independent Grocers. These cooperatives also attracted a large number of Jewish grocers.

The competition also included new supermarkets. While mostly located in the suburbs, some supermarkets were started to be located in the city and directly competing with these family-owned stores. Some of the small owners grow their businesses to become local chains of supermarkets or moving on into the liquor store business.

September 1, 1955: Following the resignation of Louis Fox that same day, Sam Klein becomes president of DGS.

1957: Sam Klein retires. Henry Noon is elected president of DGS.

March 23, 1967: Henry Noon dies of a heart attack. Francis M. Hawkins Jr. becomes acting president.

April 22, 1967: Jerome J. Litvin becomes president of DGS.

April 4–8, 1968: In 1968, Dr. Martin Luther King, Jr. was assassinated, leading to major riots in Washington DC. The National Guard was called in to restore order. Many businesses were burned or destroyed along the H Street Corridor, 7th St NW and 14th St NW. Some of these were DGS stores owned by Jewish store owners already struggling with the competition of supermarkets. Twenty-eight stores never re-opened, and many moved their families to the suburbs where they feel safer. On April 9, 1968, a notice is published in The Washington Post in partnership with several other grocery stores and supermarkets informing the public that all of their stores will be closed in memoriam of Dr. Martin Luther King, Jr.

1972: A unanimous vote of its members dissolves District Grocery Stores (DGS). The cooperative had been losing money for several years. The individual stores were to remain and run independently. It had 77 members, 300 associates, and about 1200 "cash and carry" customers. It also has a fleet of 17 trucks. The warehouse was sold to the Redevelopment Land Agency, the city's urban renewal agency, for an undisclosed price.

== Legacy ==
In 1973, a group of former District Grocery Stores members formed the Richmond Food Store cooperative. The following week, a second group of former members formed the Farm House-DGS label with funding from M. Loeb Corp., a Canadian wholesaler. Both groups attempted to attract former members in an attempt to boost their buying power.

In 1994, the Jewish Historical Society of Greater Washington organized an exhibit to present the history of the District Grocery Stores at the Lillian & Albert Small Jewish Museum. Hundreds of people gathered for the exhibit's opening, many having grown up in the stores or shopped there in their childhood. The Jewish Historical Society of Greater Washington maintains a website called Half a Day on Sunday: Jewish-Owned “Mom and Pop” Grocery Stores along with a database of all the stores that were part of the District Grocery Stores.

In 2012, the Washington, D.C., restaurant DGS Delicatessen in Dupont Circle paid homage to the memory of the local "Mom and Pop" grocery store when it opened. However, it was unrelated to the District Grocery Stores cooperative. Like the Cooperative, it eventually closed on February 11, 2018.

== See also ==
- List of food cooperatives
