= West Oakland Food Collaborative =

The West Oakland Food Collaborative is a food and nutrition activism organization, founded in 2001 in Oakland, California. It was organized by the Environmental Justice Institute and other agencies along with the residents of West Oakland to provide better access to high quality, affordable foods for the neighborhood.

The Collaborative's five areas of focus are: the Mandela Farmers Market, neighborhood greening, fresh food availability at corner/convenience stores, the Soul Foods Cooperative, and microbusiness development

== See also ==
- List of food cooperatives
