= Park Slope Food Coop =

Food cooperative in Brooklyn, New York City

Coordinates: 40.674853°N 73.976881°W

Park Slope Food Coop Inc.

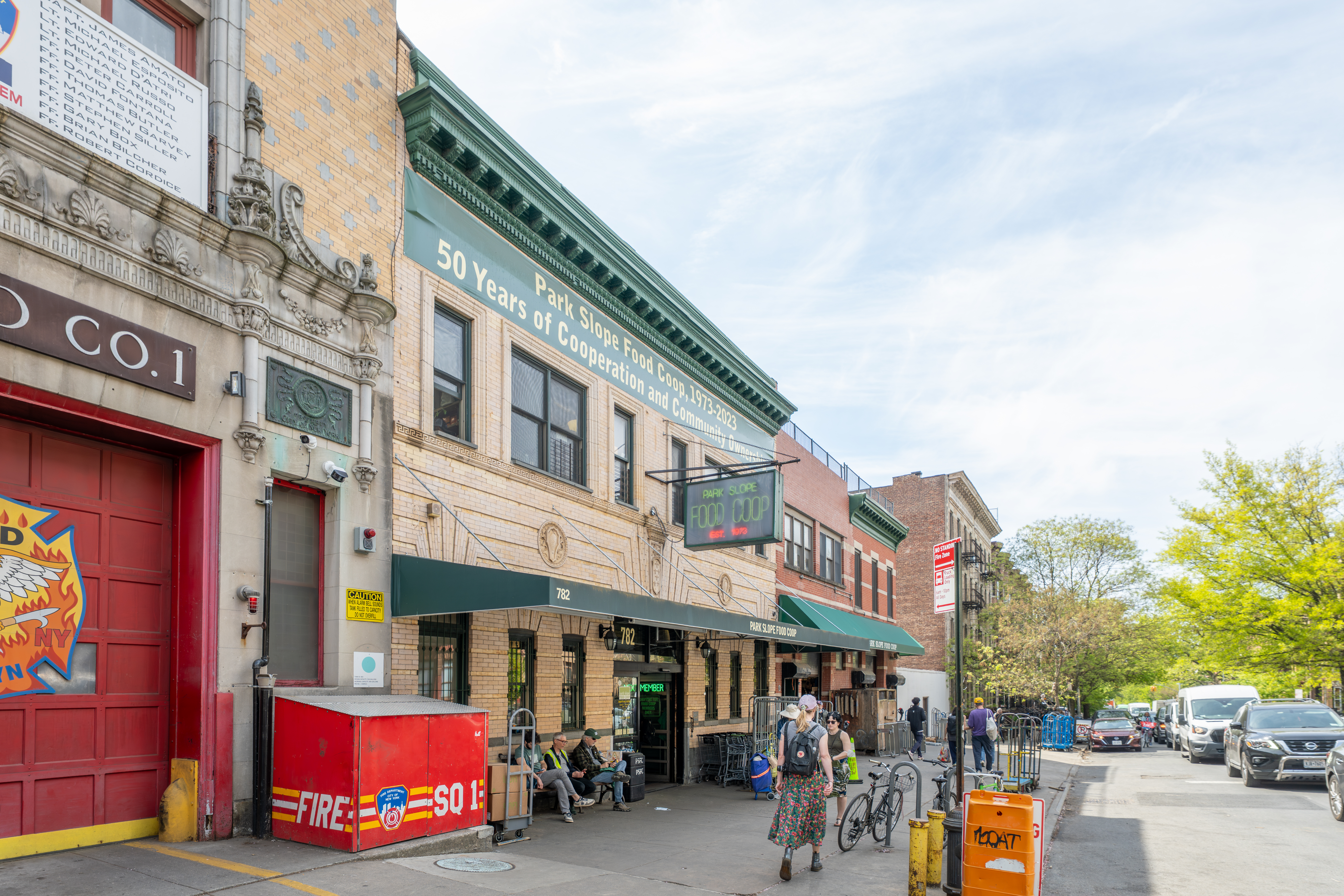
- Main Building (2026)
- Type: Consumers' cooperative
- Industry: Food retail
- Founded: 1973; 53 years ago
- Headquarters: Brooklyn, NY, United States
- Key people: Brandon West (President of the Board); Tess Brown-Lavoie (Vice President of the Board); Keyian Vafai (Board Member); Timothy Hospedar (Board Member); Lynn Husum (Board Member); Rebecca Schoenberg-Jones (Secretary); Joe Szladek (Treasurer)
- Products: Organic food, local food
- Revenue: over $56 million (2018)
- Members: 16,700 as of July 2025
- Website: foodcoop.com

The Park Slope Food Coop (PSFC) is a food cooperative located in the Park Slope neighborhood of Brooklyn in New York City. It is one of the oldest and largest active food co-ops in the United States. As a food cooperative, one of its goals is to be a "buying agent to its members, not a selling agent to any industry." Non-members may visit the store as a guest of a member, but may not shop.

Formed in 1973, PSFC had grown to include nearly 17,000 members as of July 2025. The PSFC business model requires each of its adult members to contribute 2 hours and 45 minutes of work every six weeks. In exchange, active members may shop at the store. The store sells a variety of foods and household goods, some environmentally friendly products, at a 25% markup over the wholesale price (compared to 26–100% at a supermarket). Prior to the COVID-19 pandemic, the markup was 21%, and members facing financial hardship can remain at the lower markup. The savings are possible because labor is contributed by its members. PSFC operates as a New York state cooperative corporation.

== Governance and management ==
PSFC, a cooperative corporation formed under the laws of the State of New York, is run by a board of directors consisting of five persons elected to staggered three-year terms by and from the membership. The longest-serving General Coordinator present at the meeting (usually Joe Holtz) serves as a voting member ex officio.

The board of directors gather monthly to hear the advice of the members at the General Meeting (GM), and generally approve all resolutions passed by the GM. The GM agenda is governed by an Agenda Committee, and the meeting itself is run by a Chair Committee, whose members rotate in service as chairperson and collectively serve as GM parliamentarian.

The day-to-day operations of the PSFC are run by paid employees called coordinators. The senior-ranking coordinators, called General Coordinators, are hired by the General Meeting and approved by the board of directors.

The Coop has a Diversity and Equality Committee, whose members receive workslot credit and which proposes programs to enhance membership diversity at the Coop. It also has a biweekly paper called the Linewaiters' Gazette.

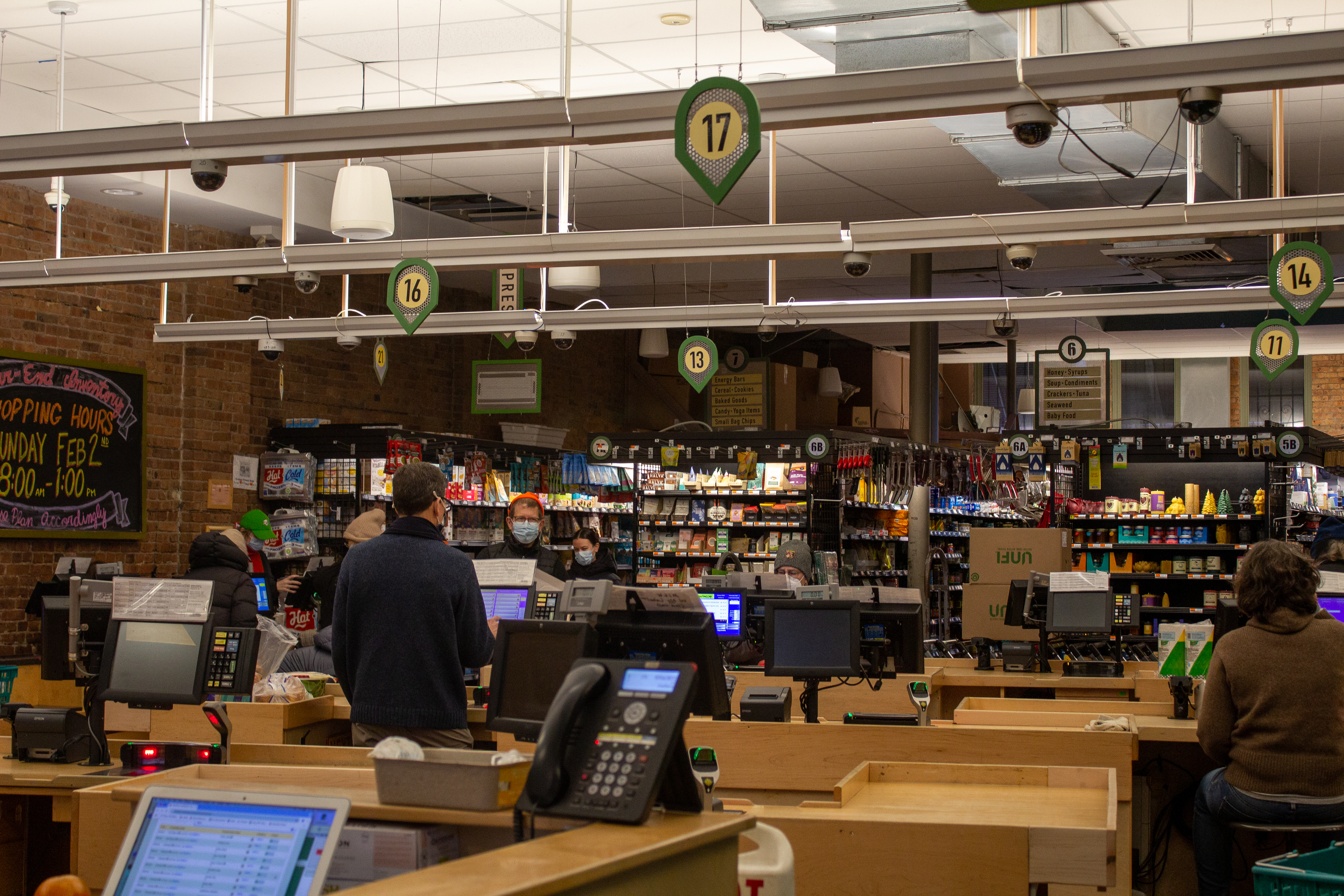
Inside Park Slope Food Coop

== History ==
The PSFC was founded in 1973 by about 10 people including Joe Holtz. The organization initially subleased space with the Mongoose Community Center. By 1977 the Mongoose was defunct and the Coop started renting directly from the landlord.

In 1978, the Coop began renting 782 Union Street with an option to buy upon the expiration of a two-year lease. Expecting to buy, the Coop completed renovations the next year and purchased the building in 1980. This was followed in 1988 and 1999 with the purchase of the two buildings immediately to the west, with renovations completed in 1991 and 2001 respectively.

In December 2009, the Coop paid the remaining $707,000 on the mortgage for all three buildings. This pre-payment was made without penalty, as the mortgage holder, National Cooperative Bank, needed assistance after the banking crisis of 2008–2009.

=== Political and environmental action ===
The Coop has a long history of political action. During the apartheid regime, goods from South Africa were banned; during the Pinochet regime, Chilean grapes were removed; Nestlé products were banned because of the company's campaign to promote infant formula instead of breastfeeding.

Coop policy dictates that existing boycotts are discontinued unless renewed annually. Since 2004, the PSFC has boycotted Coca-Cola products (including Minute Maid and Odwalla), citing the company's labor practices and exploitation of natural resources in third-world countries. Since 2010, the PSFC has boycotted Flaum Appetizing Products for violations of labor law. Flaum is a local kosher producer known for hummus sold under its "Mike & Joe's" label.

In 2008, the PSFC General Meeting resolved that the Coop would discontinue selling bottled water and stop providing plastic shopping bags at checkout.

The Coop collects a variety of hard-to-recycle plastic packaging for upcycling. This recycling initiative started with the collecting of yogurt cups to be upcycled into toothbrushes and other personal care goods by Recycling in 2008, at a time when New York City's municipal recycling limited the types of plastic accepted. With changes in NYC's trash recycling policies, the Park Slope Food Coop put together the hard-to-recycle plastics collection currently in place with Terracycle for single serve baby food pouches, plastic cling wrap, produce bags, toothbrushes, toothpaste tubes, and water filters.

In 2010, in response to an announcement by the menswear retailer Barneys New York that they would be opening a location in Brooklyn called Barneys Coop, the PSFC General Meeting (GM) considered taking action in light of the company's apparent violation of New York's Cooperative Corporations Law, which restricts the use of the term "coop" to cooperative businesses. The general coordinators informed the state attorney general of the violation and presented a plan for a lawsuit to the July 2010 GM, which rejected the proposal for anticipated costs. A more limited proposal was approved by the August 2010 GM but later overturned on procedural grounds.

On January 26, 2016, the Park Slope Food Coop voted in a change to The Rules for the General Meeting. It stipulated that to pass any boycott, a super-majority of at least 75% of the General Meeting must agree to the boycott. However, on May 26, 2026, the Coop membership voted to return a simple majority threshold of 51%.

=== Israel boycott debates ===
In 2009, The Jewish Daily Forward incorrectly stated or implied that the coop was considering a ban on Israeli products in protest of the 2009 Israeli military offensive in Gaza. In actuality, no such proposal had been placed on the agenda of the PSFC General Meeting (GM). The stories were based on two letters-to-the-editor in the February 12, 2009, edition of the PSFC's Linewaiters' Gazette. The Gazette publishes member submissions regardless of opinion. For three years members of the coop expressed their opinions in the Gazette regarding a potential boycott of Israel, and the July 26, 2011, General Meeting discussed holding a coop-wide referendum on joining the BDS movement, with no action taken. The March 27, 2012, GM, which was held at Brooklyn Technical High School due to an unprecedented turnout of nearly 1,700 members (eleven times more than typical), after a heated discussion considered and rejected a proposal to hold such a referendum.

Following the start of the war in Gaza in October 2023, debate over boycotting Israeli products intensified at the Coop. Two factions emerged: PSFC Members for Palestine, which supports joining the BDS movement, and Coop 4 Unity, which opposes the boycott. The conflict led to allegations of antisemitism and discrimination, with some members filing complaints with New York's Division of Human Rights in October 2024. U.S. Representative Ritchie Torres called on state and city human rights agencies to investigate allegations of harassment and discrimination against Jewish members.

In June 2024, board elections became a proxy battle for the boycott issue, and board members Tess Brown-Lavoie and Keyian Vafai, endorsed by Park Slope Food Coop Members for Palestine, won by more votes than any board candidates in coop history, while the pro-Israel candidates Ramon Maislen and Sondra Shaievitz received more "No" votes than any board candidates in coop history. In 2025, board elections were again a proxy for the issue, but ultimately, neither PSFC Members for Palestine candidates won. A concurrent referendum to allow hybrid meetings and online voting, seen by some as a way to facilitate a larger boycott vote, failed by 15 votes, receiving 66.43% approval against the required 66.6% threshold. The supermajority threshold was not actually required because an amendment to the by-laws was not necessary, so the board passed the hybrid meeting resolution at a later meeting.

In May 2026, the Coop held a successful vote to boycott Israeli products. Of 6,772 voters, 67% voted to approve the boycott, 31% voted against, and 2% abstained. The Coop has 16,000 members. The vote came the same day members approved the resolution lowering the total needed from a supermajority 75% of votes to a simple majority of 51%. According to reporting in The Guardian, the virtual meeting lasted for three hours and was attended by 7,000 of the cooperative's members.

A representative for the Coop said that the debate leading up to the May 2026 boycott vote had been "contentious and emotionally charged", leading the Coop to hire additional security. In a sermon earlier in May, Rabbi Rachel Timoner of Congregation Beth Elohim in Brooklyn had urged her congregants who belong to the Coop not to support the vote. She said that BDS is "part of a larger movement for the elimination of Israel" and "harms Jews who live here". On the other side of the discussion, Gabriel Young, a member of Park Slope Food Coop for Palestine, said: "When I see Israeli products stocked on the shelves, even though I’m not buying them, I’m disturbed by the fact that I know that my labor and my money is going toward the purchase of goods from a country that is committing genocide and overseeing apartheid".

Israel-based pro-Israeli Palestinian activist Bassam Eid was critical of the Coop's boycott decision. He said that the boycott "may satisfy activists, but it will not create jobs, build institutions or improve a single Palestinian life." Eid opposed boycotts like the PSFC action, which he felt harmed the livelihoods of Palestinians in many cases, instead advocating for changes in Palestinian society to work towards co-existence with Israel based on shared efforts to build prosperity and stability.Among the products subject to the boycott were tahini from Seed + Mill tahini, which works with a packing facility owned by Arab Muslim Israelis in Northern Israel, and Equal Exchange olive oil that is produced by Palestinians in the West Bank.

The Louis D. Brandeis Center for Human Rights Under Law said it is evaluating legal claims against the Coop. Coop4Unity, a group of members who opposed the boycott, said it is developing a legal strategy. Other advocacy groups say such boycotts are protected speech because they target the Israeli government, not Jews or Israelis because of religion or nationality. The National Jewish Advocacy Center sent the Coop a cease and desist letter on behalf of some members, saying the coop board violated New York's anti-boycott law and federal civil rights law.

In September 2026, a lawsuit was filed against the co-op, alleging that proponents of the boycott unjustly changed the co-op’s voting process and that Jewish members opposing the boycott faced antisemitic harassment. The boycott's proponents, the lawsuit filed by the National Jewish Advocacy Center on behalf of five Jewish co-op members, "repeatedly singled out 'Zionists,' Jewish Members, and persons with ties to Israel for criticism and exclusion," according to the Washington Free Beacon. The lawsuit requests at least $150,000 for the harassment campaign and the allegedly unjust changes to the co-op's voting process.

=== Unionization efforts ===
In the summer of 2018 a group of paid staff at the Park Slope Food Coop started unionizing efforts with the help of RWDSU, a union representing grocery store employees and other food chain workers. Among the issues raised are job security (an end to "at-will employment"), unequal treatment in the work place (racism and other forms of discrimination) and a desire to better align the Coop with international cooperative principles and values of democracy, equality, equity, and solidarity.

On April 23, 2019, several employees filed charges of unfair labor practices with the National Labor Relations Board. The complaint includes allegations of harassment, coercive statements and interrogation. Given the alleged unlawful interference in the unionization process by management, the General Coordinators of the Coop have agreed to guarantee non-interference in the unionization efforts, this has been disputed by union organizers and has been one of the issues that led to the NLRB complaint. The Park Slope Food Coop's Labor Committee, a group founded to provide "leadership and information on the labor issues that impact the coop’s food system," voiced their support of a neutrality agreement.

The NLRB settled with the Coop regarding the Unfair Labor Practice charges, as a result the Park Slope Food Coop was required to post a notice to employees stating that going forward specified labor rights will not be violated.

=== Criticism ===
The Coop work shift requirement, which includes every adult member of a household having to partake, inspired criticism in the 2000s. In 2011, The New York Times also reported allegations in February 2011 that some members were asking their nannies to cover their work shifts.

== Membership ==
After joining, new members pay a one-time membership fee and a membership investment deposit which will be returned if they decide leave the Coop.

Members are required to work a 2-hour, 45 min. shift every six weeks. The positions fall into the following categories: food processing, inventory, maintenance, office, check-out, receiving & stocking, soup kitchen prep, and soup kitchen at CHiPS (a local charity organization). All slots other than the last two directly relate to the daily operation of the Coop. Members must show up and work their shifts, but if they cannot make their usual shift they have the option to swap shifts with another member. If a member misses their shift, they must complete two make-up shifts before their next shift. The strictness of this policy has been criticized as unfair to single parents, members with multiple outside jobs, and students, since an excess of required make-up shifts requires significant working hours that may be unmanageable without external support.

Unpaid membership fees or unmet shifts lead to a status of "Alert," and then ultimately "Suspended," which prevent a member from entering and shopping at the Coop. Senior members are eligible to 'retire' from their volunteer duties, with retirement age dependent on total years of membership. Chronically ill members and anyone under 18 are also not required to work. Temporary injuries and sickness can be taken into account to excuse volunteer duties.

On Monday, March 23, 2020, for the first time in their history, the Coop suspended their member work requirement to reduce the risk of COVID-19 infection to paid staff. The Coop operated purely by existing and temporary paid workers until mid-October 2020, when a voluntary member labor program began for select assignments.

As of November 20, 2023, the Coop required face masks on the shopping floor from 8:00am to 8:00pm on Wednesdays and Thursdays. The face mask policy was passed with a 70-52 vote at the October 31, 2023 General Meeting to "support immune compromised or medically vulnerable members or those with other risk-related concerns."

== See also ==
- List of food cooperatives
