= Mariposa Food Co-op =

Food cooperative in Philadelphia

- Type: Consumers' cooperative
- Founded: 1971
- Headquarters: West Philadelphia, Pennsylvania, United States
- Products: Groceries
- Revenue: $4,000,000 (2026)
- Members: 3,000+
- Website: mariposa.coop

Mariposa Food Co-op is a food cooperative located in West Philadelphia. Founded in 1971, Mariposa is a consumer cooperative that sells groceries and other products. The store began as a buyers club, and later expanded to a storefront operated by its owner members. It currently operates out of a former bank building on Baltimore Avenue, and is open to the public.

== History ==
Mariposa was founded in 1971 in West Philadelphia, originally as a buyers club. The next year they moved to a storefront on Baltimore Avenue, which opened for a limited time each week and was staffed by co-op owners. In March 2012, Mariposa moved to a larger space on Baltimore Avenue, and opened shopping to the general public. The new building was purchased for $2.5 million, which included funding from the Philadelphia Industrial Development Corporation, the Reinvestment Fund, and the Pennsylvania Department of Community and Economic Development.

The store's workers unionized in association with the United Food and Commercial Workers International Union in March 2021. Following moves by the store's leadership that workers viewed as retaliatory, including cuts to staff hours and store opening hours, the union sought to restructure the store's management, including removing its manager, Aj Hess. Hess would later resign in November 2026, after criticism surrounding lack of product availability and falling revenue.

== Operations ==
The current store on Baltimore Avenue is open to both members and non-members. Membership is sold for $200, and entitles owners to discounts at the store and voting privileges about store operations. Membership is subsidized by donation when members cannot afford the cost, with the co-op aiming to sponsor at least 10% of its membership.
