= Frontier Natural Products Co-op =

American cooperative wholesaler

Frontier Co-op
- Company type: Retailers' cooperative
- Industry: Consumer products
- Founded: 1976, Norway, Iowa, US
- Founder: Rick Stewart
- Headquarters: Norway, Iowa, US, United States
- Area served: United States, Canada
- Key people: Tony Bedard (CEO); Clint Landis (CMO)
- Products: Herbs, spices, foods, and teas
- Number of employees: 600 (2025)
- Website: frontiercoop.com

Frontier Co-op is a cooperatively owned American wholesaler of natural and organic products, founded in 1976 and based in Norway, Iowa, US. It sells products under the Frontier Co-op, Simply Organic and Aura Cacia brands. Products include culinary herbs, spices and baking flavors; bulk herbs and spices; and organic aromatherapy products. Frontier Co-op manufactures and distributes products throughout the United States and Canada.

== See also ==
- List of food companies
- List of food cooperatives
