= Unicorn Grocery =

English workers co-operative grocery

Coordinates: 53°26′44.58″N 2°16′36.22″W

Unicorn Grocery Limited

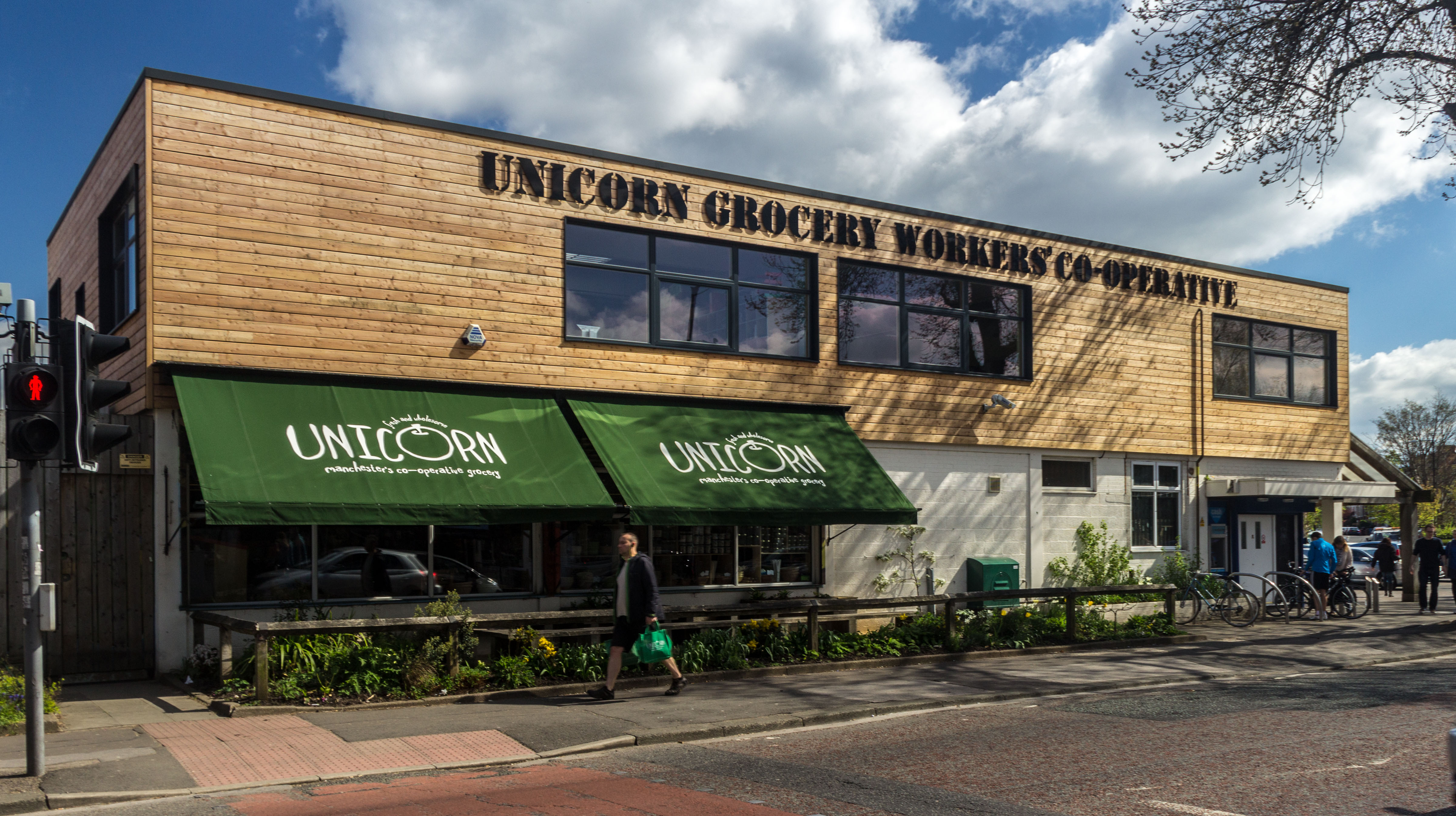
- The Unicorn store in Chorlton, Manchester
- Type: Worker co-operative
- Industry: Food retail
- Founded: 1996; 30 years ago
- Headquarters: 89 Albany Rd, Chorlton, Manchester, M21 0BN, England.
- Revenue: £8.0 million (2019)
- Members: 62 (2019)
- Number of employees: 77 (2019, including members)
- Website: unicorn-grocery.coop

Unicorn Grocery is a co-operative grocery store located in Chorlton-cum-Hardy, Manchester, England. As a workers co-op, it is controlled democratically by its members/owners, who run the business with a flat management structure and with an equal rate of pay. Ethics form the foundations of the business, and Unicorn's Principles of Purpose are the framework within which the business operates.

Unicorn is closely connected to local sister company Glebelands City Growers in Sale and owns 21 acres (8.5 ha) of peri-urban growing land at Glazebury, Cheshire. It sells fresh, dried and processed food and drink, much of it organic and with a focus on local and Fairtrade sourcing, as well as household, bodycare and general grocery items. Keeping prices in line with the supermarkets, Unicorn is one of the largest independent wholefood groceries in the UK and has an annual turnover of around £7 million. In 2017, it won the BBC Food & Farming Awards 'Best Food Retailer'. During 2008 it won two national awards, named BBC Radio's 'Best Local Food Retailer' and The Observer Food Monthly's 'Best Independent Retailer'. In 2026 it won the Consumer Facing Social Enterprise of the Year award at the UK Social Enterprise Awards. The judges said “Flat-rate pay structure, worker democracy, and over £6m spent supporting ethical, organic, and Fairtrade supply chains make them a standout.”

== Business model and structure ==
Unicorn is based on a model devised by Roger Sawtell, former chair of the Industrial Common Ownership Movement (ICOM), a co-operative federation that now forms part of Co-operatives UK. Roger has written at length on co-operative structure and employee participation and his model was first put into practice at Daily Bread Co-operative, a workers co-op in Northampton (now with a sister branch in Cambridge). The idea to set up a similar company in Manchester came about in 1994, based on the experiences of Adam York, who had worked in the Northampton shop.

The model revolves around direct, often bulk purchasing (directly from manufacturers where possible rather than distributors), on-site processing to add value, and competitive margins and pricing, matching supermarket prices.

Unicorn is based on the core principles of co-operative organisation, in that is that the business is owned and democratically run by its employees (the membership of the co-op), and they are the people who receive profits or other benefits generated by the business. There are no outside shareholders, executives or owners.

The co-op is almost completely 'fully mutual', i.e. all staff are members of the co-operative. The exception being that 5–10% of hours needed can be performed by 'casual' staff. Experiments with a third level of non-member 'shop assistants' proved unsuitable for the co-op.

== Unicorn today ==
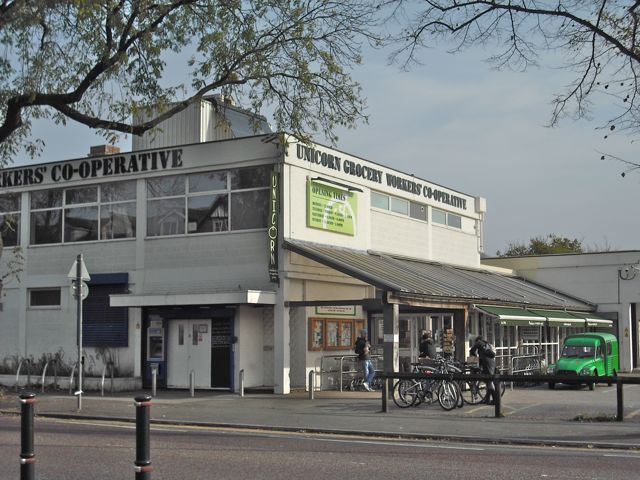
Unicorn Grocery in 2011, prior to a refurb

The business occupies a 10,000-square-foot (930 m^{2}) site (including large storage and office space), has a turnover of around £7 million, and employs around 65 co-op members plus casual staff. It sells unpackaged organic fruit and vegetables, basic dried ingredients, prepared foods, chilled and delicatessen goods, organic bread and alcohol and environmentally friendly body and household products. All are sourced with the shop's principles in mind, with a focus on local, organic and fair-trade. As well as groceries, the shop provides a kids play area, information about the products and what to do with them, and a 'Green Roof'.

In 2007 Unicorn members became land owners, purchasing 21 acres (85,000 m^{2}) of growing land 14 miles (23 km) from the shop in Glazebury, Cheshire, once again using loanstock to finance the purchase. Designed to improve and secure the shops's regional fresh supply, the land will be used to grow vegetables organically, for sale in the shop, cutting food miles significantly.

== History ==
From an original working group of two people, the shop opened on 21 September 1996 with a working group of four members plus volunteers. Financial support and advice came from sources including the Industrial Common Ownership Finance Ltd (ICOF) Co-op Finance Team, a Triodos Bank loan and loanstock (a form of fixed term bond raised from supporters and potential customers). Turnover began at £4000 per year and reached £4 million by 2007. This was matched by growth in staff, reaching 51 by 2007.

Having rented the site for 7 years, Unicorn faced closure in 2003 when owners 'Town and Country' decided to sell the site. Using £100,000 of loanstock bonds raised in a week a mortgage from Triodos bank, and additional funding from ICOF, Co-operative Action and Triodos Bank's Inspiring Change Scheme Unicorn raised the £1 million needed and bought the building.

Growth has necessitated organisational changes within the co-op, the most significant being the creation of a 'representative structure', a departure from all members attending the fortnightly members decision-making meetings. After the group swelled beyond 15 people, members divided into teams, and individual co-op members are now represented by 'team overviews' at fortnightly 'forum' meetings.

== Principles ==
Unicorn operate within a set of guidelines, known as its 'Statement of Purpose':

- Secure Employment. The company aims to provide secure employment for its members.
- Equal Opportunity. The company aims to reserve some employment for members with a learning disability.
- Wholesome Healthy Consumption. The company aims to trade in wholesome foodstuffs and household goods of non-animal origin. It trades in foodstuffs which have undergone minimal processing. Product guidelines include the avoidance of added sugar, salt and animal derivatives.
- Fair and Sustainable Trade. The company aims to trade in a manner which supports a sustainable world environment and economy. It trades preferentially in products which follow the "Fair Trade" ethos.
- Solidarity in Co-operation. The company aims to support like minded ventures, co-operatives or otherwise. It seeks to encourage co-operation by operating a fund to support projects which share its vision of community and society in the United Kingdom. 1% of the wage costs are contributed to this fund.

== See also ==
- List of food cooperatives
