= Ocean Beach People's Organic Food Market =

Food coop

Ocean Beach People's Food Cooperative
- Company type: Cooperative Food Store
- Founded: 1972
- Founder: Willie Groome, Diane Miller, Davis Hayden
- Headquarters: Ocean Beach, San Diego, CA, USA
- Products: Organic Food, Local Food, Consumer Goods
- Revenue: $10,000,000 (2021)
- Members: 14,000 (2022)
- Website: https://www.obpeoplesfood.coop/

The Ocean Beach People’s Organic Food Market is a food cooperative located at 4765 Voltaire street in the Ocean Beach community of San Diego, California. It was previously called the Ocean Beach People’s Food Store. People’s started as a retail store at 4859 Voltaire Street, selling natural foods and household products. The current co-op is member-owned, but open to the public, and focuses on offering locally grown organic food.

== History ==
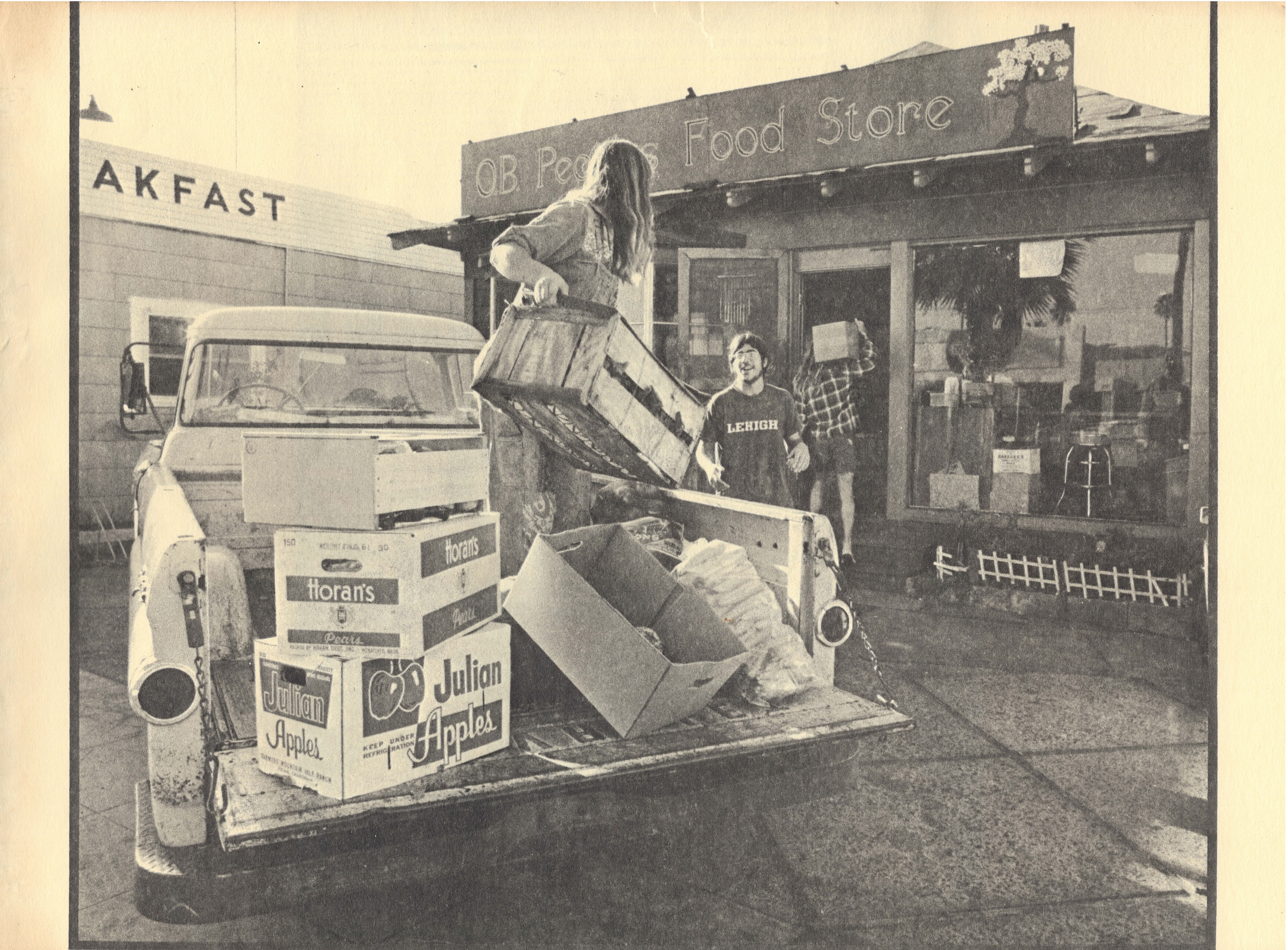
Delivering produce to the Ocean Beach People's Food Store in San Diego, California. Deborah Menkart in the truck and Jimbo Someck in the Lehigh t-shirt, both of whom worked with the store. Early 1970s. Date provided in the field below is an estimate.

People’s Food originated from a food buying club operating in Ocean Beach in 1971 that was eventually located at the Ocean Beach Free School. In August 1972, three of the buying club members decided to open a store front at 4859 Voltaire Street. The initial markup was 20% and designed to only cover the cost of operating the store, paying no salaries or wages. As the store volume increased, the markup of essential items such as milk and eggs was decreased to 10%. By 6 months, the store "was grossing $11,000 a month". Initially, the three original people ran the store with occasional help from students of the Ocean Beach Free School which operated across the street from the store. However, as the volume of customers increased, they enlisted community volunteers who received food credit for their work. Next, more managers were added, and in 1973, the store itself expanded by moving to a larger building at 4765 Voltaire Street. In 1985, the store converted to a food cooperative.

== Current status ==
In 2002, People’s food built a new larger store at the 4765 Voltaire Street location. This store was one of three stores in San Diego cited by the San Diego Union Tribune as having "high marks for energy efficiency." In 2018, People's was chosen to be visited by "18 delegates from China" to learn more about food quality in America and the "green" philosophy of the co-op movement. Currently the store has about 14,000 members-owners and is currently a member of the National Cooperative Grocers Association
