= The Urban Co-op =

Irish consumer co-operative

- Limerick Community Grocery CLG
- Type: Consumer cooperative
- Headquarters: Limerick City
- Services: Groceries; Therapy Space; Events Space; Community Space
- Members: 2500
- Affiliations: Co-operative Movement
- Website: theurbanco-op.ie

Limerick Community Grocery CLG, trading as Urban Co-op, is a consumer co-operative based in Limerick, County Limerick providing local, organic groceries to its members and local community.

== History ==
The Urban Co-op has its root in attempts by Meitheal Mid West to address the challenges of unemployment in Limerick taking inspiration from the successful Mondragon Corporation. After assessing that the conditions in Ireland were not conducive starting worker co-operatives, the collective "turned [their] attention to something more . . . practical . . . something more achievable" such as a community grocery.

The Urban Co-op began as an informal buying club before evolving into a full service community grocery and retail hub.

== Activities ==
The Urban Co-op provides an extensive selection of organic products, with a focus on supporting local, small producers. Since moving to its 600 sq/m premises in Eastway Business Park, it has been able to support a 7 day a week operation alongside a 'Wellness Hub' offer therapy rooms for rent.

== See also ==
- List of food cooperatives
