= Food cooperative =

Food distribution outlet organized as a cooperative

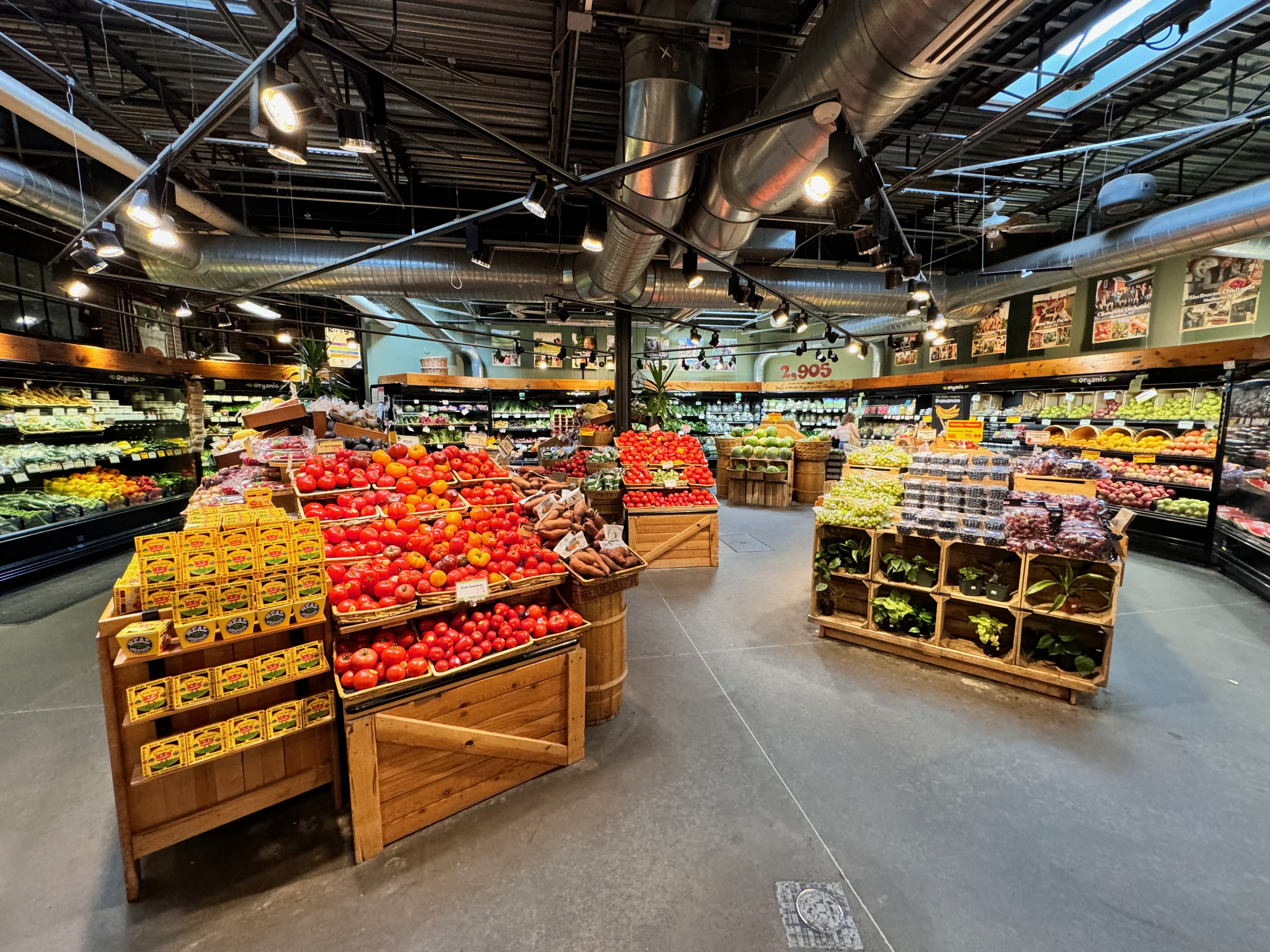
Interior of a food cooperative

A food cooperative or food co-op is a food distribution outlet organized as a cooperative, rather than a private or public company. Food cooperatives are usually consumer cooperatives, where the decisions regarding the production and distribution of its food are chosen by its members. Food cooperatives are often based on the 7 Rochdale Principles, and frequently offer natural foods. Decisions about how to run a cooperative are not made by outside shareholders, therefore cooperatives often exhibit a higher degree of social responsibility than their corporate analogues.

In the United States, the National Cooperative Grocers (NCG) is a cooperative federation that is composed of 146 food cooperatives.

Food cooperatives also exist in areas lacking decent food or grocery stores, which are normally in low income areas and smaller rural communities. In addition to creating outlets for local production and providing their members a chance to contribute to their communities, they face the typical challenges of this type of business. The lower the prices they offer for their members, the harder it is to keep their businesses going, members can get burnt out and have difficulty competing with the bigger corporate food companies.

== History ==
The cooperative movement started in the 19th century and the first notable food cooperative was started in Rochdale, England by industrial weavers known as the Rochdale Pioneers. The origin of the modern cooperative movement began in the 1960s when many "second wave" cooperatives started. The goals of these cooperatives were to provide an organic and anti-corporate alternative to chain grocery stores. Food cooperatives began to emerge in major cities and college towns, catering to the food-conscious. Co-op members made the decision of what foods to buy and how to purchase and distribute it. Between 1969 and 1979, close to 10,000 food co-ops were established.

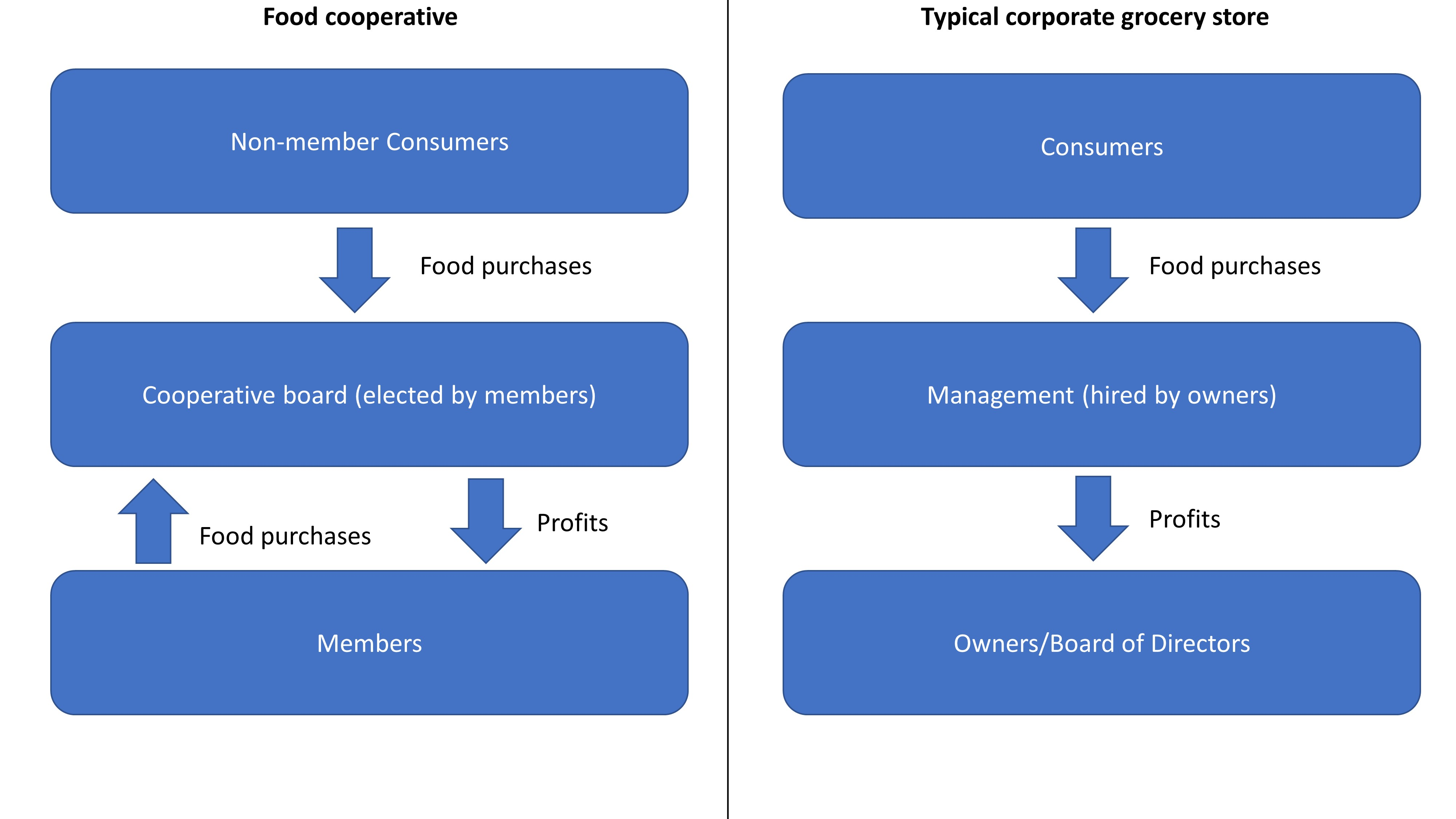
A comparison of economic flows and ownership structure for a food cooperative and corporate grocery store

== Economic structure ==
A key aspect of the food cooperative model is the socialization of potential profit associated with running a grocery store. In a typical food production model, a store is owned by a company, which is in turn managed by either a board of directors and shareholders (if the company is publicly owned) or by a collection of private individuals (if it is not). A food cooperative, in contrast, is directly owned by both its employees and its members, people who shop at the cooperative and who typically pay a nominal fee for joining. When the store makes a profit, much as with a corporation, these profits are either divided among the members or reinvested in the business. These decisions are often made by a board, for which any member of the cooperative can run. In general, membership is open to any community member, with stores adopting official policies of nondiscrimination. However, some cooperatives will limit membership to a certain geographic area, such as a state.

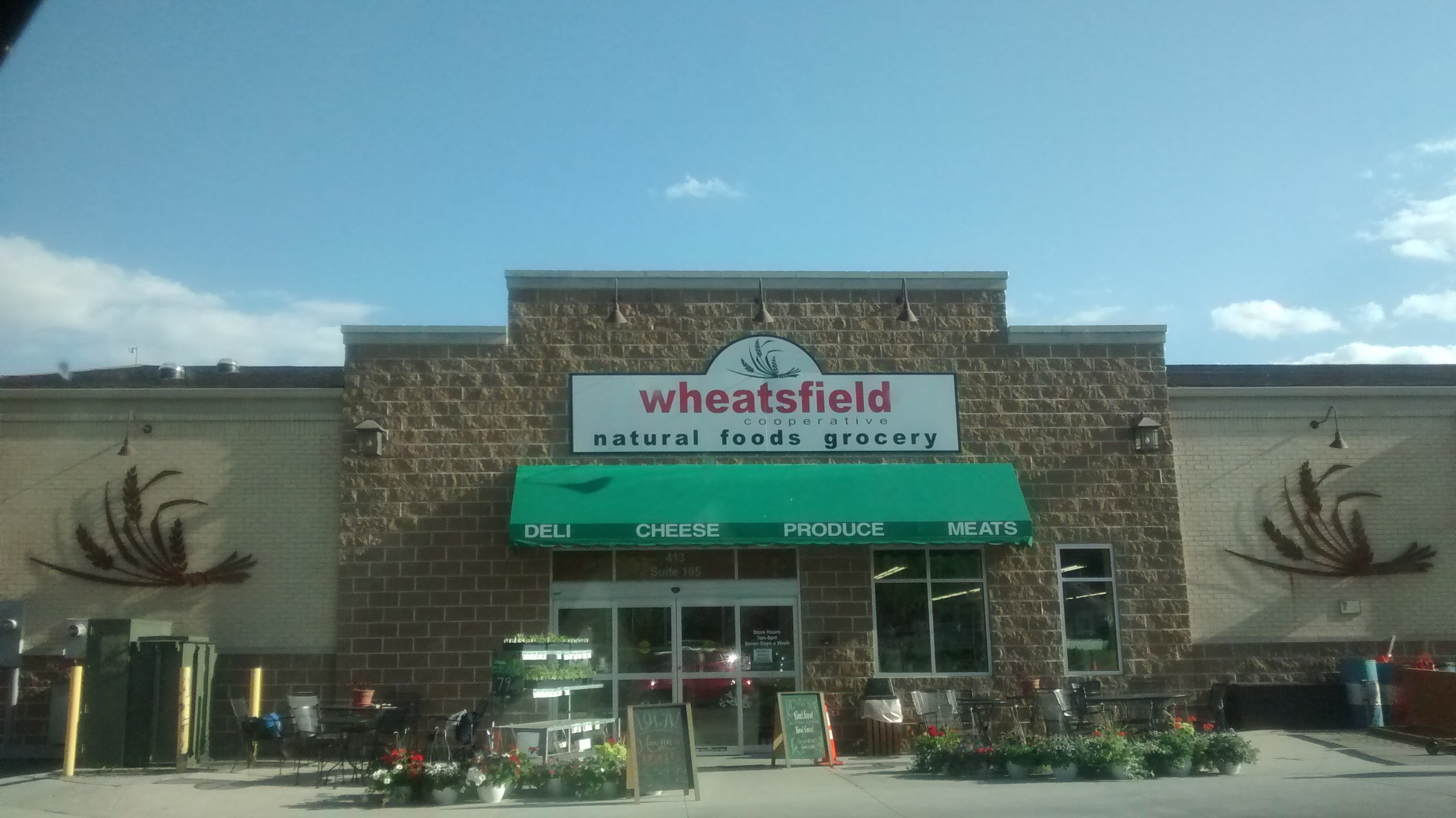
A food cooperative in Ames, Iowa.

=== Pricing ===
Each cooperative has a different fee structure, typically determined by its management, but in general, members of the public will have the option of purchasing a membership that will yield discounted prices on food, as well as a vote on decisions. A key difference with corporations is that while voting power on corporate decisions is in proportion to the number of shares owned, nearly all cooperatives operate according to the “one member, one vote” principle.

=== Tax policy ===
In the US, cooperatives are taxed differently than small businesses. Earnings of the cooperative itself are not subject to business taxes; however, any profits made by the individual members are treated as income and as such are subject to income taxes.

=== Comparison with CSA ===
In contrast, a similar program, community supported agriculture, socializes the risks associated with growing the food, transferring it from the growers to consumers. These two programs often work in concert in rural areas, and are associated with each other by consumers. However, in a CSA program, the consumer is purchasing a limited ownership in the farm, the production of the food, instead of the grocery store, the distribution of the food.

== Scale of cooperatives in the United States ==
Food cooperatives in various forms operate on a large scale in the United States, occupying a noticeable part of the grocery market, albeit with large geographic variation. One study found that grocery cooperatives claim 485,000 total members in the United States, with 325 total stores. However, differences in definition can lead to measurement discrepancies, depending on what exactly one defines as a food based cooperative, since many cooperatives operate in the food sector, but are not restricted to groceries. For example, “Farm supply and marketing” cooperative members totaled 2.484 million in the US.

== Formation of a food cooperative ==
Cooperatives are generally formed by a core group of members who form the initial governing body. These members must contribute enough in initial membership fees to get the grocery store off the ground and finance startup costs, such as purchasing a store, which can be a significant challenge for the cooperative model. The logistical and financial obstacles associated with planning a store and establishing a distribution network are significant, especially when no individual owns the store. This contrasts with typical corporate grocery stores, which can be financed using debt or equity, and whose owners can eventually reap a profit to recoup their investment.

== Benefits ==
=== Market benefits ===
Cooperatives have potential spillover effects on the rest of the grocery store market. According to researchers at the University of Wisconsin, “Cooperatives play a key role in agricultural markets not only because they account for a significant fraction of economic activity in this sector, but also because they are believed to generate a pro-competitive effect in imperfectly competitive markets.” The grocery market, in particular, is often not very competitive in geographically isolated areas, with only enough consumer base to support one major supermarket. In response to high prices caused by this monopoly, a cooperative may spring up, supported by a network of consumers looking for lower prices. Because the profits are redistributed to the members, a traditional grocery store must reduce its profits in order to compete. Lastly, some studies indicate the spillover benefits to the community are significant. One found that “For every $1,000 spent at a food co-op, $1,606 goes to the local economy; for every $1 million in sales, 9.3 jobs are created”.

=== Agricultural sector benefits ===
Academic research has described the benefits cooperatives can have in economically connected sectors, namely food production: “Cooperatives play other socially beneficial roles in the agricultural sector. They provide an opportunity for farmers to share risk and to control managerial decision-making for their direct benefit. Additionally, they offer a credence attribute — farmer ownership — which can be attached to farm commodities, thus providing additional value to some consumers.”

=== Consumer benefits ===
Another potential benefit to members is the different niche of the food market often occupied by cooperatives. Cooperatives often have a focus on local, organic, or otherwise more sustainably sourced products. Consumers often support the local ownership of the cooperative model, in contrast to many grocery store chains owned by multinational corporations.

=== Rural access ===
Food cooperatives in other places in the world help with different local needs. In the more rural part of Quebec, those are extremely important in smaller towns, where bigger supermarket companies do not want to open stores. They keep those smaller towns moving and active to make sure local people can buy quality produce close to their homes.

== Geography ==
In the United States, food cooperatives are more common in the northern states of the US, with Vermont, Minnesota, and Wisconsin having the highest concentrations. Vermont, in particular, has a concentration three times higher than any other state. Food cooperatives are commonly co-located with higher incomes, higher educational attainment, the presence of land trusts, and population over age 65. In the United States, there are a number of regional associations of food cooperatives. These associations can provide logistical support, a distribution network, or operate under the franchise model, which can provide a recognizable brand.

== Socioeconomic challenges and geographic accessibility ==
=== Food deserts ===
Low income communities normally contain "food deserts", which are areas that lack access to nutritious and healthy foods. Supermarket chains have a tendency to not open or close stores in these areas because they see little profit there. As a result, the community has to open their own cooperative grocery store.

=== Capital barriers ===
Food cooperatives in low income neighbourhoods face unique challenges. Because of the costs, few people consider it viable to start a grocery store. Furthermore, there is a lack of leading and consulting services.

=== Equity ===
Also, many food cooperatives focus on carrying specialty items and organic foods, while the convenience of this items is often appreciated, it usually comes with a higher price. This can sometimes put this companies in the position of being inaccessible to the low income members of the community, this results in complaints about the store being a symbol of gentrification in that area.

=== Volunteer burnout ===
Some cooperative stores encounter a number of day to day operating problems, a study in the UK discovered that many co-ops in that country have a tendency to rely on unpaid help. Over time, this becomes difficult and causes them to lose money, causing those co-ops to be forced to compete with discount supermarkets.

=== International models ===
In Europe, some food cooperative supermarkets, for example in Spain, mandate their members to work a determined number of hours each month in the store. This keeps the costs lower and helps local farmers to sell their products directly to the shoppers.

== See also ==
- Cooperative
- Consumers' cooperative
- Community-supported agriculture
- Food conspiracy
- List of food cooperatives
- Minnesota Food Cooperative Wars
- Vegetable box scheme
