= University of Texas at Austin High School =

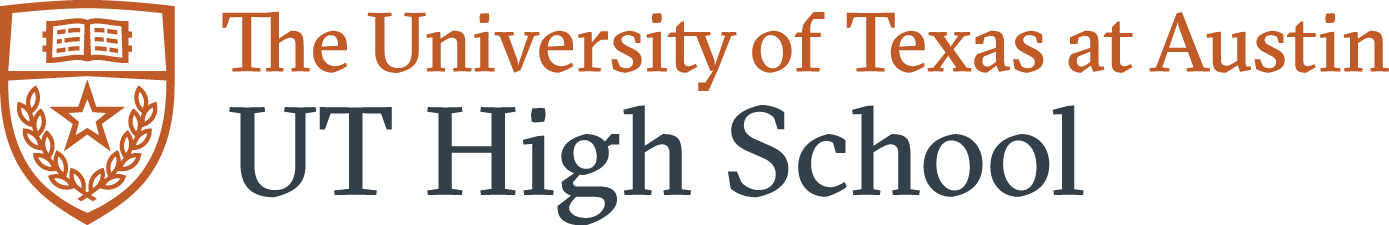

Location
- 2901 North Interstate Highway 35; Austin, Texas 78722; United States; 30°17′13.56″N 97°43′24.32″W

Information
- Other name: UT High School
- Type: College-preparatory; Online
- School board: UTHSD Advisory Board
- School district: University of Texas at Austin High School District
- NCES District ID: 4801473
- Educational authority: Texas Education Agency
- Superintendent: Michael Caudill
- CEEB code: 440344
- NCES School ID: 480147313991
- Principal: Dr. Darnell Horton
- Assistant Principal: Dustin Payne
- Staff: 5000
- Faculty: 1200
- Teaching staff: 900
- Employees: 9400
- Grades: 9-12
- Enrollment: 1056
- Student to teacher ratio: 12:1
- Colors: Burnt orange and white
- Mascot: Bevo; Hook 'em
- Newspaper: The Daily Texan
- Affiliation: University of Texas at Austin
- Website: highschool.utexas.edu

The University of Texas at Austin High School (UTHS) is an accredited, university-based online high school institution operated by the University of Texas at Austin. Its offices are located at the University's campus in Austin, Texas, United States. It offers distance education high school courses which allows academically talented students to earn high school credit or a diploma from anywhere in the world. It operates as a four-year school, serving students in grades 9–12.

== History ==
In 1998, the Texas State Board of Education authorized UTHS to provide a high school curriculum and award Texas high school diplomas. UTHS is a Texas public school, defined as a Special Purpose District (TEC §11.351).

== Academics ==
UTHS offers more than 60 online courses, including English, social studies, mathematics, science, world languages, health, computer applications, physical education, economics, and electives. It also offers Advanced Placement (AP) courses in a number of subjects. Course credits are earned through examination. All of its courses are designed to meet the Texas Essential Knowledge and Skills (TEKS) requirements.

== See also ==
- Indiana University High School
- Stanford University Online High School
- University of Missouri High School
- University of Nebraska High School
