= McDonogh School =

Private school in Owings Mills, Maryland, US

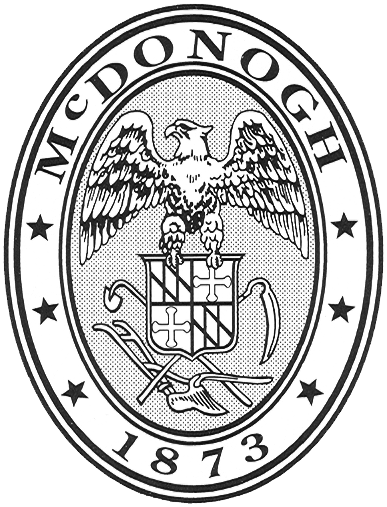

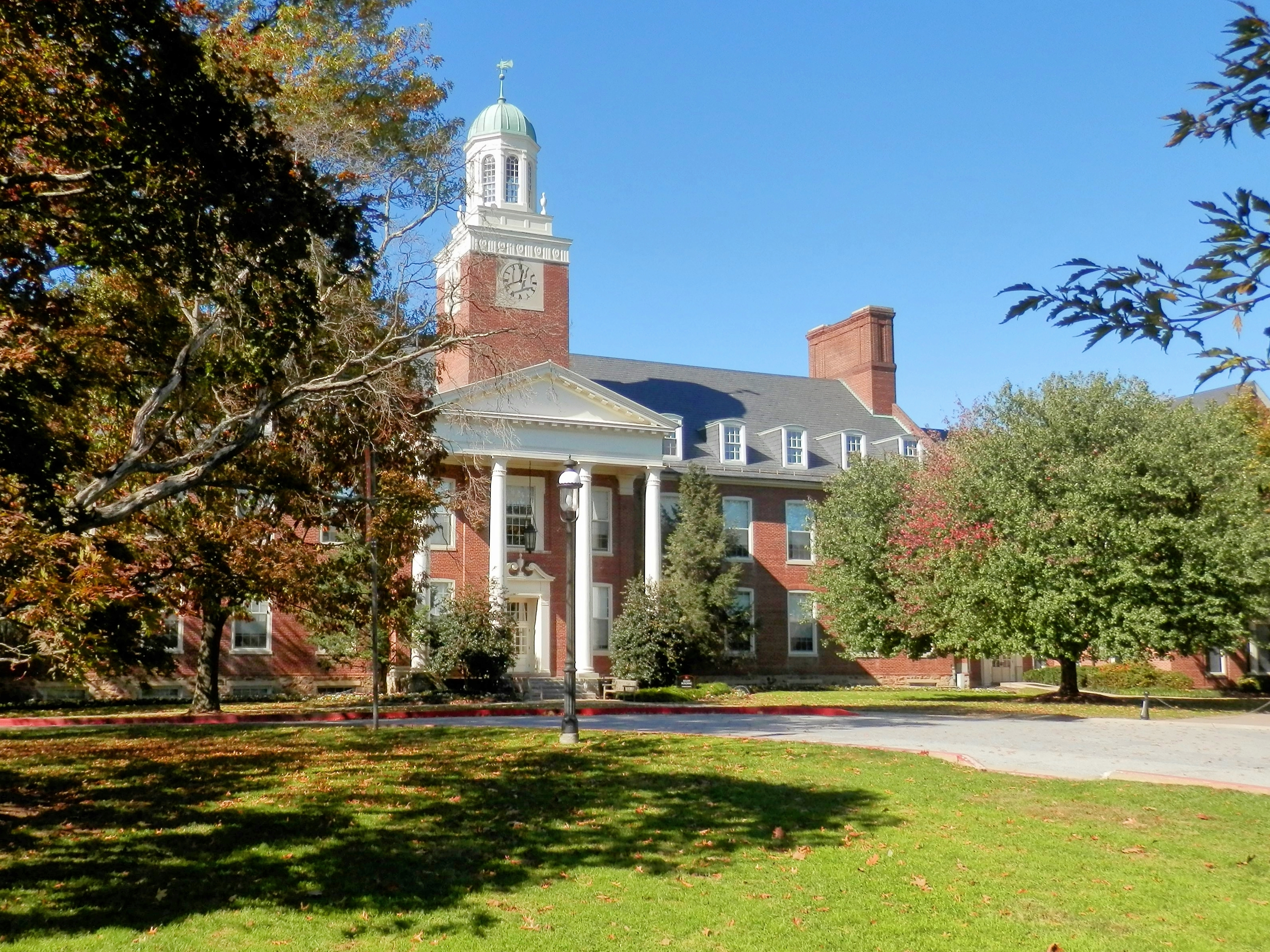
- Allan Building on the school campus

Location
- 8600 McDonogh Road; Owings Mills, Maryland 21117; United States; 39°23′40″N 76°46′40″W

Information
- Type: Independent School, Boarding
- Established: 1873
- Head of school: David J. Farace
- Grades: Pre-K to 12
- Enrollment: 1,460 (2024–2025)
- Colors: Orange and Black
- Mascot: Eagle
- Endowment: $80 million
- Tuition: Pre-Kindergarten $26,800; Kindergarten and Pre-First $37,700; Lower School $40,000; Middle School $42,300; Upper School $44,600; Upper School Five-day Boarding $52,250 (2025–2026)
- Website: www.mcdonogh.org

McDonogh School is a private, coeducational, PK-12, non-denominational school situated on an 800-acre (320 ha) campus in Owings Mills, Maryland, United States. McDonogh enrolls 1,460 students, approximately 75 of whom participate in the Upper School's five-day boarding program. The school employs approximately 190 full-time faculty members; more than 7,400 students have graduated from Mcdonogh School, and more than 50 faculty and students live on campus.

The school is a member of the Association of Independent Maryland Schools and the National Association of Independent Schools.

== History ==
The school was established outside of Baltimore, Maryland, in 1873 and funded by the estate of John McDonogh (1779 - 1850), a former Baltimore resident and slave owner. The McDonogh campus encompasses 800 acres of land and houses more than 15 educational buildings including the Allan Building, the Marlene and Stewart Greenebaum Building, Elderkin Hall, and Dudley Hall.

McDonogh was established as a semi-military school for orphan boys who worked on the farm in exchange for their tuition, room, and board. Paying students arrived in 1922, and day students in 1927. The first African-American student was admitted in 1959, eight years after Brown v. Board of Education outlawed school segregation. In 1971, the military traditions of the school were discontinued. It was the preseason training camp site for the Baltimore Colts in 1974. The school became coeducational in 1975. McDonogh School's annual tuition ranges from $26,800 for Pre-Kindergarten students up to $44,600 for students of the Upper School. Financial aid continues to this day, with $7.1 million in need-based aid awarded in the 2023-2024 school year.

David J. Farace, the present head of school, is the 13th person to hold this position. He assumed the role in 2018, succeeding Charles W. Britton.

== Academics ==
The Upper School offers a college preparatory curriculum that includes English, world languages, social studies and history, mathematics, science and computer science, visual and performing arts, debate, wellness, and physical education courses. Honors or Advanced courses are available in all academic departments. Upper School students must also complete a community service requirement. All students perform an academic project independently or in small groups during the final three weeks of their senior year.

== Roots Farm ==
Roots Farm started as a community farm and garden in 2009 and is on the edge of McDonogh's campus. With two barns, a greenhouse, 10 beehives, chickens and turkeys, and a culinary kitchen and outdoor brick oven, Roots is a teaching and learning space used by faculty in all disciplines.

The bulk of the produce is harvested by students and community volunteers. The produce harvested from the farm is donated to the Maryland Food Bank's Farm to Food Bank program. The produce is also served in the school's dining halls, and a portion is sold to local restaurants with proceeds supporting the school's seed-to-table program. In 2023, the farm donated 6,685 pounds of produce to the Maryland Food Bank.

Roots Farm also hosts Honey of a JamFest, an annual celebration held usually in late September. It includes a corn maze and outdoor farm games.

== Notable alumni ==
- David Adkins, (1988) actor and playwright
- Grant Aleksander (1978), actor and director
- John R. Bolton (1966), National Security Advisor of the United States
- Edward Marshall Boehm (1929), sculptor
- Wallace E. Boston, Jr., president and chief executive officer, American Public University System
- Luke Broadwater (1998), journalist, Pulitzer Prize and George Polk Award winner
- Henry G. Chiles, Jr. (1956), former commander-in-chief of the United States Strategic Command
- Ken Cloude, former professional baseball pitcher for the Seattle Mariners
- Jazwyn Cowan, professional basketball player
- Taylor Cummings (2012), former women's field lacrosse player for the University of Maryland, first person to win the Tewaaraton Award three times
- Bruce Davidson (1968), world champion equestrian, Olympic gold medalist
- Dani Dennis-Sutton (2022), NFL defensive end for the Green Bay Packers
- W. Timothy Finan, Maryland state delegate and judge
- Brandon Finney Jr. (2025), Oregon defensive back
- Henry Gantt (1878), mechanical engineer and management consultant, most famous for developing the Gantt chart in the 1910s
- Darrius Heyward-Bey (2005), former NFL wide receiver
- Louis Hyman (1995), economic historian
- Curtis Jacobs (2020), NFL linebacker for the Tennessee Titans
- Eric King (2000), former NFL defensive back
- Kayel Locke, professional basketball player.
- Myles Martin (2015), freestyle, professional, and Olympic wrestler, NCAA champion and 2x U23 champion
- James McDaniel (1976), actor, played Lt. Fancy on NYPD Blue
- Ben Queen (1992), screenwriter, television producer, wrote Disney/Pixar's Cars 2 and Cars 3
- Pam Shriver (1979), former professional tennis player and current sports broadcaster
- Frederic N. Smalkin (1964), Maryland's Chief Federal District Judge and brigadier general
- Giles Smith (2009), competitive swimmer
- Harry P. Storke (1922), US Army lieutenant general
- DaJuan Summers (2006), basketball player
- Evan Taubenfeld (2001), recording artist, songwriter; Avril Lavigne's lead guitarist from spring 2002 to September 2004
- Joseph D. Tydings (1946), former senator for Maryland, 1965–1971
- Jenn Wasner (2004), indie rock musician
- Josh Woods (2014), NFL linebacker for the Atlanta Falcons
