= Billy Waugh =

United States Army soldier and CIA officer (1929–2023)

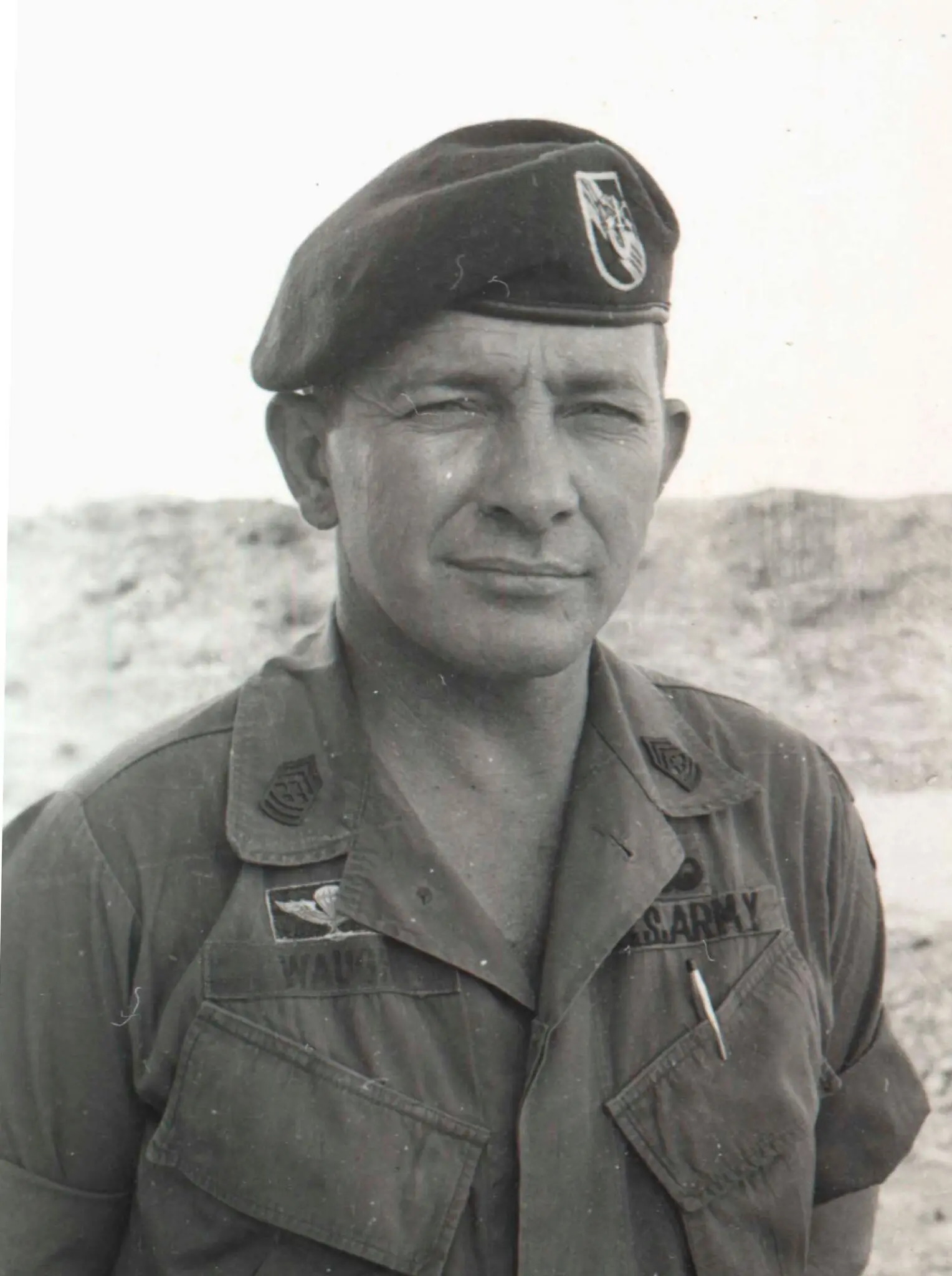
- Waugh with 5th Special Forces Group during the Vietnam War.
- Born: William Dawson Waugh; December 1, 1929; Bastrop, Texas, U.S.
- Died: April 4, 2023 (aged 93); Tampa, Florida, U.S.
- Education: Wayland Baptist University (BA); Texas State University (MA)
- Military career
- Allegiance: United States
- Branch: United States Army
- Service years: 1948–1972
- Rank: Command sergeant major
- Nicknames: "Billy"; "Mustang"
- Units: 10th Special Forces Group; 5th Special Forces Group; MACV-SOG
- Conflicts: Korean War; Vietnam War; War in Afghanistan; Iraq War
- Awards: Silver Star; Legion of Merit; Bronze Star Medal (4); Purple Heart (8)
- Other work: U.S. Postal Service (1972–1977); CIA (1977–2005)

William Dawson Waugh (December 1, 1929 – April 4, 2023) was an American soldier and paramilitary operations officer whose career in clandestine operations with the U.S. Army's Special Forces and the Central Intelligence Agency's Special Activities Division spanned more than 50 years.

Waugh joined the U.S. Army before the Korean War, and following the war he quickly moved into Special Forces, first with 10th Group, and later 5th Group. In the Vietnam War he served with various detachments conducting night raids and training irregular Vietnamese and Cambodian forces for attacks along the Ho Chi Minh Trail. By the end of the Vietnam War, he was serving as the command sergeant major of MACV-SOG, an elite covert operations unit, where he conducted the first combat high altitude-low opening (HALO) parachute jump in military history. He left the Army in 1972 with eight Purple Heart medals and a Silver Star. He spent the next five years as a letter carrier for the U.S. Postal Service.

In 1977 he joined the CIA's Special Activities Division. By the 1990s, he was serving in Sudan tracking terrorist leaders Carlos the Jackal and Osama bin Laden. Following the September 11 attacks, Waugh, by then aged 71, joined ODA 594 as one of the first on the ground during the U.S. invasion of Afghanistan. He fought Taliban and al-Qaeda fighters at the Battle of Tora Bora.

Waugh retired from the CIA in 2005 and died in 2023; his cremated remains were scattered in a HALO jump over Raeford Drop Zone, North Carolina. Much of his career remains classified.

== Early life ==
Waugh was born in Bastrop, Texas, on December 1, 1929. In 1945, upon meeting two local United States Marines who returned from the fighting in World War II, the then 15-year-old Waugh was inspired to enlist in the Marine Corps. Knowing that it was unlikely that he would be admitted in Texas because of his young age, Waugh devised a plan to hitchhike to Los Angeles, where he believed a person had to only be 16 to enlist. He got as far as Las Cruces, New Mexico, before he was arrested for having no identification and refusing to give his name to a local police officer. He was later released after securing enough money for a bus ticket back to Bastrop. Now committed to serving in the military once he finished school, Waugh became an excellent student at Bastrop High School, graduating in 1947 with a 4.0 grade point average.

== Military career ==
Waugh enlisted in the United States Army in 1948, completing basic training at Fort Ord, California, in August of that year. He was accepted into the United States Army Airborne School and became airborne qualified in December 1948. In April 1951, Waugh was assigned to the 187th Airborne Regimental Combat Team (RCT) in Korea.

=== Special Forces ===
Shortly after the end of the Korean War, Waugh met two U.S. Army Special Forces members on a train in Germany. They informed him of openings for platoon sergeants; shortly after he requested a transfer. He began training for the Special Forces, and earned the Green Beret in 1954, joining the 10th Special Forces Group (SFG) in Bad Tölz, West Germany.

As U.S. involvement in the Vietnam War increased, the United States began deploying Special Forces "A-teams" (Operational Detachment Alpha, or ODA, teams) to Southeast Asia in support of counterinsurgency operations against the Viet Cong (VC), North Vietnamese and other Communist forces. Waugh arrived in South Vietnam with his ODA in 1961 and began working alongside Civilian Irregular Defense Groups there and in Laos.

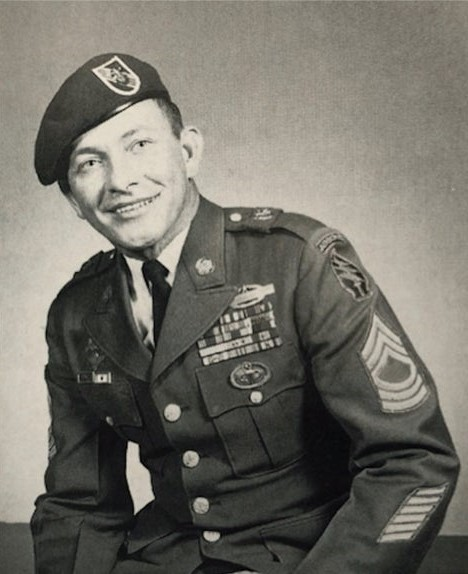
Billy Waugh during his Army service

In July 1965, he was serving with 5th Special Forces Group A-team A-321 at Camp Bồng Sơn, Bình Định Province, commanded by Captain Paris Davis. Following a night raid with a Regional Forces unit on a VC encampment near Bong Son, the unit was engaged by a superior VC force. Many of the Regional Forces soldiers refused to fight and most of the A team were injured by VC fire, including Waugh, who was shot multiple times and left between the VC and U.S./South Vietnamese forces. Waugh was later rescued by Davis under fire. He spent much of 1965 and 1966 recuperating at Walter Reed Hospital in Washington, D.C., eventually returning to duty with 5th Special Forces Group in 1966. He received a Silver Star and a Purple Heart (his 6th) for the battle at Bong Son.

At this time Waugh joined the Military Assistance Command-Vietnam Studies and Observations Group (MACV-SOG). While working for SOG, Waugh helped train Vietnamese and Cambodian forces in unconventional warfare tactics primarily directed against the North Vietnamese Army operating along the Ho Chi Minh Trail.

Prior to his retirement from U.S. Army Special Forces service, Waugh was senior NCO (non-commissioned officer) of MACV-SOG's Command & Control North (CCN) based at Marble Mountain on the South China Sea shore a few miles south of Da Nang, Vietnam. Waugh held this Command Sergeant Major role during the covert unit's transition and name change to Task Force One Advisory Element (TF1AE). Waugh conducted the first combat High Altitude, Low Opening (HALO) jump, a parachuting maneuver designed for rapid, undetected insertion into hostile territory. In October 1970, his team made a practice Combat Infiltration into the NVA-owned War Zone D, in South Vietnam, for reassembly training, etc. Waugh also led the last combat special reconnaissance parachute insertion by American Army Special Forces HALO parachutists into denied territory which was occupied by communist North Vietnamese Army troops on June 22, 1971.

Waugh retired from active military duty at the rank of sergeant major (E-9) on February 1, 1972.

== CIA career ==
After Waugh retired from the military, he worked for the United States Postal Service until he accepted an offer in 1977 from ex-CIA officer Edwin P. Wilson to work in Libya on a contract to train that country's special forces. This was not an Agency-endorsed assignment and Waugh might have found himself in trouble with U.S. authorities if it were not for the fact that he was also approached by the CIA to work for the Agency while in Libya. The CIA tasked him with surveilling Libyan military installations and capabilities – this was of great interest to U.S. intelligence as Libya was receiving substantial military assistance from the Soviet Union at the time. Wilson was later indicted and convicted in 1979 of illegally selling weapons to Libya. It was later found that the Department of Justice had relied on a false affidavit when prosecuting Wilson; as a result, Wilson's convictions were overturned in 2003 and he was freed the following year.

CIA leadership under the Carter administration sought to distance itself from Waugh, so he took a job as the deputy chief of police at the U.S. Army Kwajalein Missile Range in the Marshall Islands where he was tasked with tracking Soviet small boat teams operating in the area to prevent them from stealing U.S. missile technology.

By the late 1980s, Waugh had returned to the CIA. He took part in several important assignments in Khartoum, Sudan during the early 1990s, where he performed surveillance and intelligence gathering on terrorist leaders Carlos the Jackal and Osama bin Laden alongside Cofer Black.

At the age of 71, Waugh participated in Operation Enduring Freedom from October to December 2001 as a member of the CIA's Northern Alliance Liaison Team led by Gary Schroen which went into Afghanistan to work with the Northern Alliance to topple the Taliban regime and Al Qaeda at the Battle of Tora Bora.

It is unknown how many missions Waugh was involved in during his career.

== Education ==
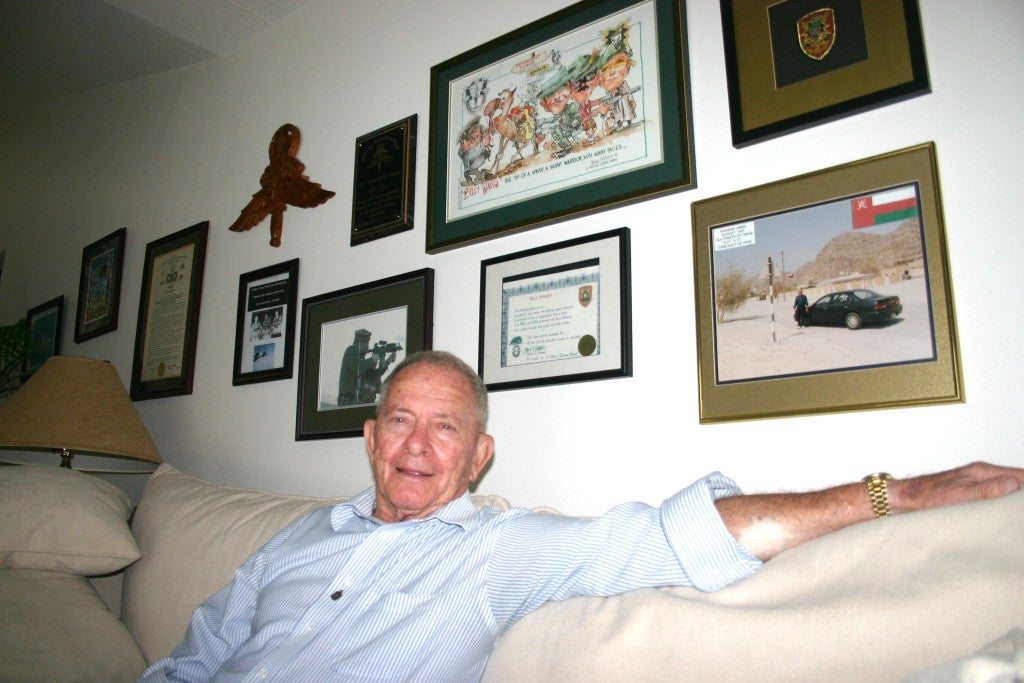
Waugh in 2011.

In 1985, Waugh was again requested by the CIA for clandestine work. Before he took the offer, he decided to further his education, earning bachelor's degrees in Business and Police Science from Wayland Baptist University in 1987. He also earned a master's degree in Interdisciplinary Studies with a specialization in criminal justice administration (MSCJA) in 1988 from Texas State University (formerly Southwest Texas State), in San Marcos, Texas.

== Death ==
Waugh died on April 4, 2023, at the age of 93. A memorial service was held at U.S. Special Operations Command headquarters at MacDill Air Force Base, Florida, presided over by the Commander of USSOCOM, General Bryan Fenton.

Waugh was cremated. A portion of his ashes were returned to his birthplace of Bastrop, Texas, while in accordance with his wishes, the remainder was scattered by a HALO jump team in a parachute jump over Raeford Drop Zone in Raeford, North Carolina.

== Publications ==
- Waugh, Billy; Keown, Tim (2004). Hunting the Jackal. William Morrow. ISBN 9780062133571.
- Jacobsen, Annie (May 2019). Surprise, Kill, Vanish; The Definitive History of Secret CIA Assassins, Armies, and Operations. Little, Brown. ISBN 9780316441438. Archived from the original on 2019-06-01.
- Confronting Iran: Securing Iraq's Border: An Irregular Warfare Concept, A Small Wars Journal collaboration with Brig. Gen. David L. Grange (USA, ret.), Scott Swanson (military) (AKA J.T. Patten, Author), Maj. Gen. John K. Singlaub (USA, ret.) and Billy Waugh, November 10, 2007.

== Awards and decorations (partial list) ==
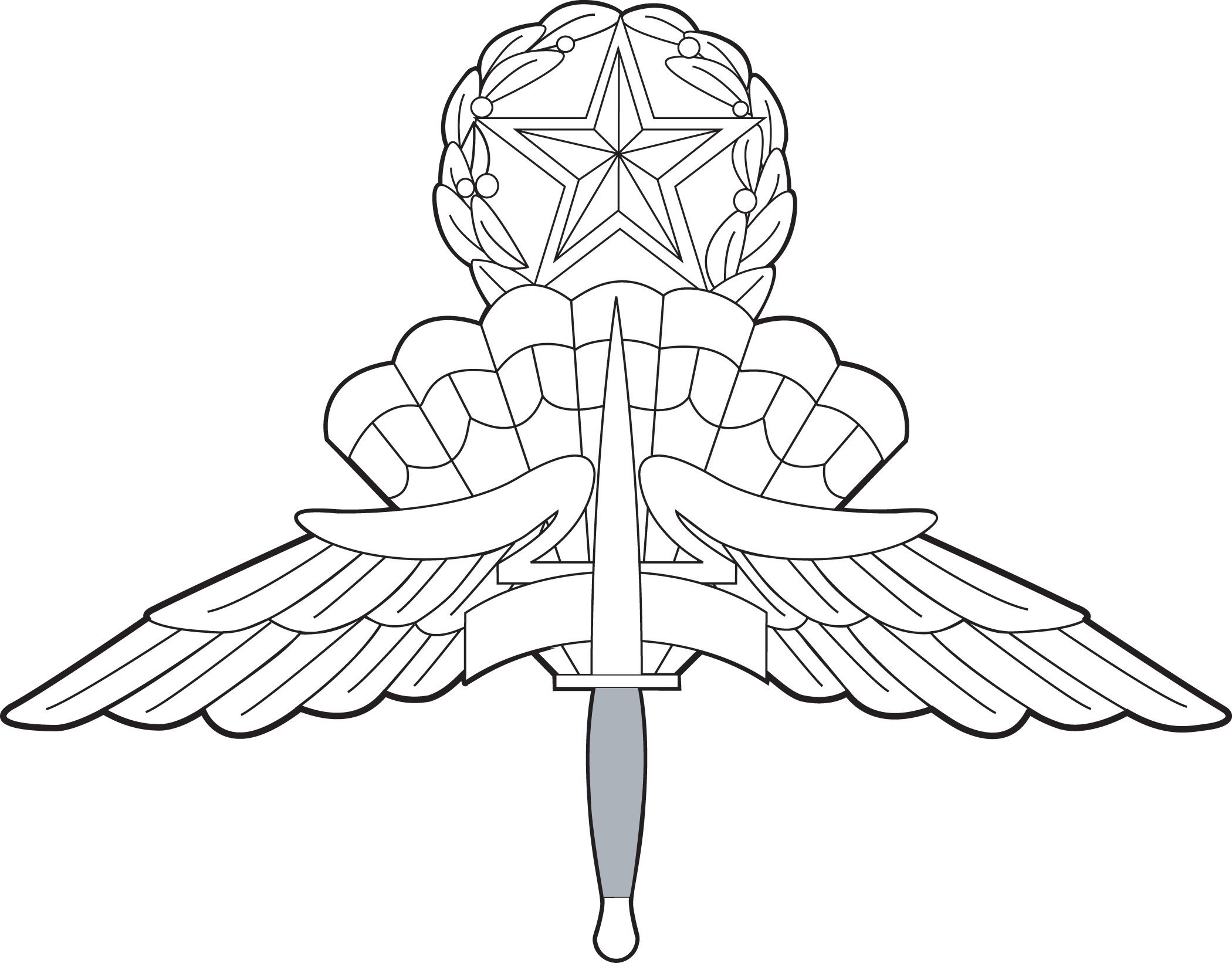
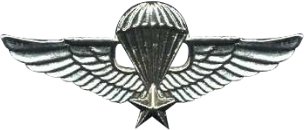
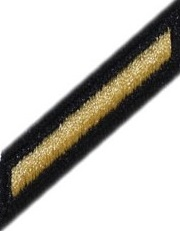
Combat Infantryman Badge (two awards)
Special Forces Tab
Master Parachutist Badge
Military Freefall Jumpmaster Badge with gold combat jump star (5+ combat jumps)
Vietnam Parachutist Badge
7 Service stripes
? Overseas Service Bars

Silver Star
Legion of Merit
Bronze Star Medal with three bronze oak leaf clusters
Purple Heart with seven oak leaf clusters
Air Medal
Army Commendation Medal with Valor device and three oak leaf clusters
Army Presidential Unit Citation with oak leaf cluster (one award in 2001, SOG)
Good Conduct Medal (7 awards)
Army of Occupation Medal
National Defense Service Medal with one bronze service star
Korean Service Medal with three campaign stars
Armed Forces Expeditionary Medal
Vietnam Service Medal with Arrowhead device and six service stars
Republic of Korea Presidential Unit Citation
Vietnam Presidential Unit Citation
Republic of Vietnam Gallantry Cross Unit Citation
Republic of Vietnam Civil Actions Medal Unit Citation
United Nations Korea Medal
Vietnam Campaign Medal
Republic of Korea War Service Medal

== See also ==
- Studies and Observations Group
