= Downtown Charles Town Historic District =

Historic district in West Virginia, United States

- U.S. National Register of Historic Places
- U.S. Historic district
- Charles Town City Hall

- Location within West Virginia Location within the United States
- Location: Charles Town, West Virginia
- Coordinates: 39°17′21″N 77°51′33″W
- Architectural style: Georgian, Federal, Greek Revival
- NRHP reference No.: 97000263
- Added to NRHP: March 21, 1997

The Downtown Charles Town Historic District comprises the commercial center of Charles Town, West Virginia. The district centers on Washington Street and includes the Jefferson County Courthouse and the New Opera House, themselves on the National Register of Historic Places. Other structures include the Market House, the Independent Fire Company building and the Post Office. A few very early buildings are included, such as the Sheetz House, dating to 1797.

The town is significant as the scene of the trial of John Brown and as a contested town during the American Civil War. Charles Town is closely associated with the Washington family, as it was laid out by George Washington's brother Charles Washington.

During the Civil War, there was fighting in the town itself on several occasions. In 1864, General Philip Sheridan used the Rutherford House at 417 East Washington Street as a headquarters for the Valley Campaign, meeting General Ulysses S. Grant there.

== See also ==
- Charles Washington House (Happy Retreat or Mordington)
- Old Charles Town Historic District
