= Gibson-Todd House =

Historic house in West Virginia, United States

- U.S. National Register of Historic Places
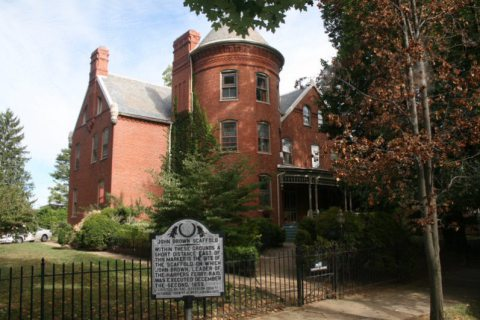

- Location within West Virginia Location within the United States
- Location: Charles Town, West Virginia
- Coordinates: 39°17′08.5″N 77°51′22.0″W
- Architect: Mullet, Thomas A.
- Architectural style: Late Victorian
- NRHP reference No.: 83003238
- Added to NRHP: September 1, 1983

The Gibson-Todd House was the site of the hanging of John Brown, the abolitionist who led a raid on Harpers Ferry, West Virginia before the opening of the American Civil War. The property is located in Charles Town, West Virginia, and includes a large Victorian style house built in 1891.

The house was built by John Thomas Gibson, who led the first armed response to Harpers Ferry during Brown's raid as commander of the Virginia Militia in Jefferson County. Gibson went on to serve as an officer for the Confederacy. After the war he was mayor of Charles Town.

Among those present at Brown's hanging were Stonewall Jackson, John McCausland, J.E.B. Stuart and John Wilkes Booth. When the old Jefferson County jail was demolished, Gibson saved stones from the building and built a monument to the event on the property. The house post-dates Brown's hanging.

The house was designed by Thomas A. Mullett, son of Alfred B. Mullett. Mullett also designed the New Opera House and the new Charles Town jail.
