= Old Charles Town Historic District =

Historic district in West Virginia, United States

- Charles Town, Old, Historic District
- U.S. National Register of Historic Places
- U.S. Historic district
- Location within West Virginia Location within the United States
- Location: Charles Town, West Virginia
- Coordinates: 39°17′14″N 77°51′43″W
- Built: 1747
- Architect: Washington, Charles; Hunter, Andrew, et al.
- Architectural style: Georgian, Federal
- NRHP reference No.: 00001308
- Added to NRHP: November 2, 2000

The Old Charles Town Historic District comprises more than three hundred structures, primarily residences, in Charles Town, West Virginia. In contrast to the mainly commercial Downtown Charles Town Historic District, the Old Charles Town Historic District includes many early houses, some of log construction. Later houses are in the Federal style, with Italianate and Greek Revival buildings. A number of Second Empire and Victorian homes are present.

The most notable house in the district is Hunter Hill, the house of Andrew Hunter, chief prosecutor of John Brown. Built in 1820, the house was destroyed during the American Civil War by his Unionist cousin David Hunter, and was rebuilt in 1865.
