= Stanford Online High School =

- Stanford University; Redwood City, California; United States

Information
- Type: Independent; College-preparatory; Online
- Established: 2006
- Founder: Raymond Ravaglia
- CEEB code: 054127
- Head of School: Tomohiro Hoshi
- Faculty: 90
- Grades: 7–12
- Enrollment: 986
- Student to teacher ratio: 12:1
- Colors: Red and White
- Mascot: Pixel
- Accreditation: WASC
- Newspaper: OHS Observer
- Affiliations: NAIS, CAIS, CIS
- Website: ohs.stanford.edu

Stanford Online High School, also known as Stanford OHS, SOHS, or OHS, and formerly known as EPGY Online High School, is an online, college preparatory independent school located within Stanford University for academically talented students worldwide. It operates as a six-year school, serving students in grades 7–12. The current head of school is Tomohiro Hoshi.

Stanford OHS was formerly a part of the wider offerings of the Education Program for Gifted Youth, a collection of gifted education programs within Stanford University. With the restructuring of the program into Stanford Pre-Collegiate Studies, Stanford OHS became fully independent in its administration from other components of the program.

== History ==
In April 2005, EPGY executive director Raymond Ravaglia proposed to expand its online course offerings into a fully-fledged online school. This informal proposal, made to the Malone Family Foundation of Englewood, Colorado, was well received. The foundation requested a full proposal.

Over the summer of 2005, Ravaglia fleshed out his ideas into a complete design for an online school for gifted students. In January 2006, the Educational Program for Gifted Youth received a substantial gift from the foundation to help develop the school. Formerly known as "The Education Program for Gifted Youth Online High School at Stanford University," it was typically referred to as "EPGY OHS," "Stanford EPGY OHS," or simply "OHS."

The school was officially established on September 7, 2006, with students in grades 10–12. The school accepted thirty students for its inaugural year and projected an eventual enrollment of up to 600 full-time equivalent students. In 2006, Stanford OHS received accreditation from the Western Association of Schools and Colleges. In 2008, the school was approved as an online education provider by the University of California and the California State University systems.

Ninth grade was added for the 2008–09 academic year, and for the 2009–10 academic year, supported by an additional gift from the Malone Family Foundation, it was able to add a middle-school component for students in grades 7–8. In January 2015, Stanford OHS became the first online school to become accredited by the California Association of Independent Schools (CAIS). In 2022, Stanford OHS joined the Council of International Schools (CIS).

Until the 2014–15 school year, Stanford OHS used Saba Centra as the hosting provider for its classes. However, in for the 2014–15 school year, the school switched to Adobe Connect. Stanford OHS uses Canvas as its learning management system.

== Academics ==
Stanford OHS offers classes in nine major subjects: core, English, humanities, history, languages, mathematics, computer science, economics, and science. The school distinguishes itself by offering a wide variety of university-level courses, often at the post-AP level, but discontinued advanced placement (AP) courses starting in the 2024–25 school year.

=== Seminar classes ===
In seminar courses, Adobe Connect is used as the primary platform for communication. Concurrent video feeds enable each student to see their classmates and instructors during the seminar, maximizing interaction and engagement. Seminar classes are usually hosted once or twice a week, depending on the specific course. If hosted twice a week, classes typically meet on Mondays and Wednesdays or Tuesdays and Thursdays.

=== Placement by ability ===
At Stanford OHS, students are placed in courses by their individual ability, not by grade level. Placement assessments are administered to all incoming students in each course. Each student's schedule is individualized, allowing them to be challenged in every subject. Classes typically have a variety of students in different grade levels.

=== Core sequence ===
The four courses offered in the core sequence covers subjects in science, history of science, political theory, and philosophy. The four-year interdisciplinary core sequence focuses on critical thinking as well as oral and written argumentation. Placement in these courses is correlated with grade level, but enrollment in higher-level courses is not restricted for students who place into them. Placement in the core sequence typically follows the students' placement in English courses due to the strong writing components of each core course.

Core courses for 7th and 8th grade are optional for part-time and full-time students, while core courses for 9th, 10th, 11th, and 12th grade are required for a Stanford OHS diploma.

- Logos, Cosmos, and Doubt (LCD), an optional 7th-grade core course, is an interdisciplinary philosophy course focusing on philosophy of cosmology and logic.
- Human Nature and Society (HNS), an optional 8th-grade core course, is a core philosophy course examining human nature.
- Methodology of Science: Biology (MSB), usually taken in 9th grade, introduces students to scientific reasoning, statistical analysis, and philosophical thinking using biology for context.
- History and Philosophy of Science (HSC), usually taken in 10th grade, focuses on teaching basic philosophical problems, and the methods used to test the resulting explanations. The main focuses of this course are philosophy of science and history of science.
- Democracy, Freedom, and the Rule of Law (DFRL), usually taken in 11th grade, focuses on studying changing conceptions of how political states should be organized. The main focus of this course is political philosophy.
- Critical Reading and Argumentation (CRA), usually taken in 12th grade, is a course which focuses on philosophical thinking about modes of reasoning, philosophical discussions of religious concepts, the nature and limits of knowledge, the nature and content of ethics, and the mind's relation to the world.

== Enrollment levels ==
Stanford OHS offers three enrollment levels, determined by the number of courses a student is enrolled in during each academic year.

The three options are full time for students taking 4–5 courses, part time for students taking 2–3 courses, and single course for students taking 1 course (or 2 semester-long courses). In their decision, students may only be offered certain enrollment levels, which is known as restricted admission, or may be offered all enrollment levels, which is known as full admission. Additionally, enrollment may be restricted to certain subject areas, such as STEM or the humanities. Students may choose to elect to select their preferred enrollment level in their applications.

All enrolled students receive an official transcript for courses taken at the school regardless of their enrollment level, and are permitted to participate in student life activities online and in-person. However, college counseling is only available to full-time students.

== Application and admissions ==
Admission at Stanford OHS is selective. As of the 2027–28 school year, the application requires prior academic records, two essays, five short questions, two recommendation forms, one sample of a student's analytical writing, a parent questionnaire, and various other information. All applicants who have not attended a school taught in English for at least the past two academic years (including homeschool) must submit standardized test scores.

Students may indicate their preference for any of the three enrollment levels, but all applicants are considered for each of the three enrollment levels. The application process is identical for each applicant regardless of desired enrollment or grade level. Applicants to grades 7–8 (middle school) follow the same application process and requirements as those applying to grades 9–12 (high school).

Stanford OHS does not admit students mid-year, and only admits students to the start of each academic year in the fall. It is rare for graduating seniors (full time 12th grade students) to be admitted when intending to graduate. Applicants for full-time 12th grade admission are typically asked to consider repeating 11th grade to satisfy Stanford OHS graduation requirements. Applicants to 12th grade for part time or single course enrollment are not subject to graduation requirements at Stanford OHS, and may be admitted under a restricted admission status.

== Tuition ==
Tuition costs at Stanford OHS vary by enrollment level.

For the 2024–25 school year, tuition at Stanford OHS is $5,970 for single course enrollment, $17,910 for part-time enrollment (2–3 courses), and $29,850 for full-time enrollment (4–5 courses). The tuition costs were not changed from the previous school year.

Financial aid is available, and is awarded to students based on demonstrated financial need. Stanford OHS operates on a need-blind admissions process for both domestic and international students, and commits to ensuring that both continuing and newly admitted students can attend, regardless of their financial status. In the 2023–24 school year, Stanford OHS allocated over $2.5 million in financial aid, including Malone scholarships. This substantial financial aid effort resulted in more than half of the beneficiaries receiving financial aid awards covering 75% or more of their tuition costs, whether they were enrolled full time, part time, or single course.

The range of financial aid awards vary from 10% to 100% of tuition. These awards are determined based on the individual financial needs of the family and the availability of funds. To be considered for financial aid, families must complete a separate application for financial aid.

== Notable alumni ==
- Isabelle Fuhrman, actress (2015)
- Evita Griskenas, rhythmic gymnast (2019)

== See also ==
- Indiana University High School
- University of Missouri High School
- University of Nebraska High School
- University of Texas at Austin High School
- Laurel Springs School
- Dwight Global Online School
- Stride, Inc.
- Apex Learning
- Connections Academy
