= Charles Town Cave =

Cave in United States of America

- Interactive map of Charles Town Cave
- Location: Charles Town, West Virginia, United States
- Coordinates: 39°17′27″N 77°51′33″W
- Length: 175 feet
- Discovery: 1906
- Geology: Elbrook Limestone
- Entrances: 1
- Difficulty: Easy
- Access: Private property

Charles Town Cave — also formerly known as Crystal Lake Cave and Lakeland Cave — is located in the center of Charles Town, West Virginia, United States. One entrance was in the cellar of a bakery (since demolished) and led down to a passage about 175 feet long to a large pool of clear water about 25 feet in diameter. Much of the cave is under the current Old Opera House building.

The cave was discovered accidentally in 1906 and was developed as a commercial show cave in the late 1920s and early '30s. Water sampling in 1997 showed the presence of petroleum contamination.

The cave is closed to the public. Rumors persist about other entrances to the cave in various Charles Town and Ranson buildings.
