= American Public University System =

American university company

- Motto: Educating those who serve
- Type: Private, for-profit, online university system
- Established: 1991; 35 years ago
- Accreditation: Higher Learning Commission
- President: Nuno Fernandes
- Faculty: 1,750+
- Students: 88,557
- Undergraduates: 83%
- Postgraduates: 17%
- Location: Charles Town, West Virginia, United States
- Campus: Online
- Colors: Navy blue, gold, white
- Mascots: AMU Golden Eagles; APU Volunteers
- Website: apus.edu
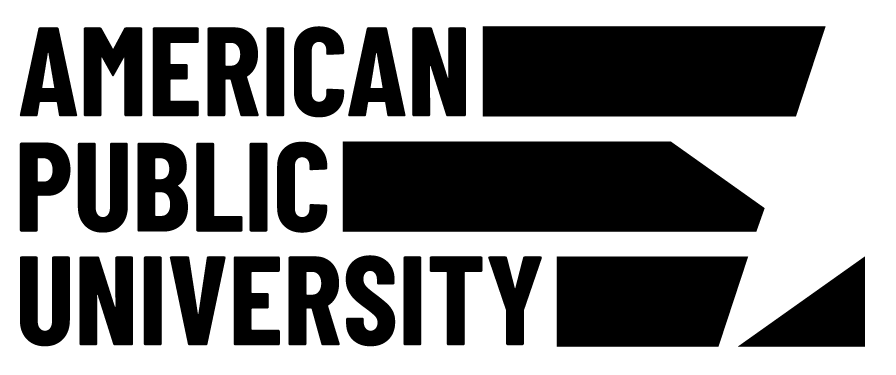

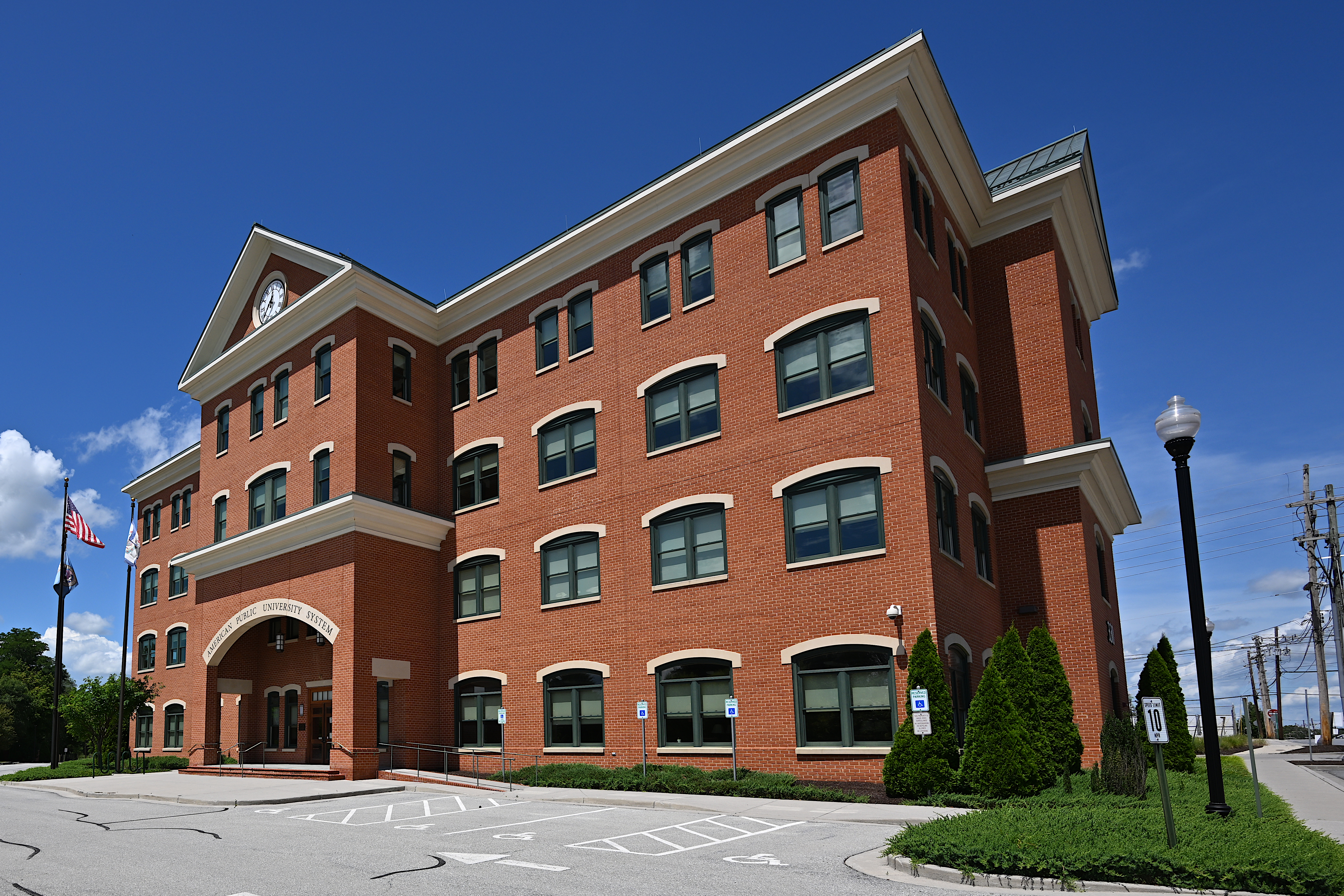
APUS main office

American Public University System (APUS) is a private, for-profit, online university system headquartered at Charles Town, West Virginia. It consists of American Military University (AMU) and American Public University (APU).

APUS is wholly owned by American Public Education, Inc., a publicly traded private-sector corporation. APUS maintains corporate and academic offices in Charles Town, West Virginia. APUS offers associates, bachelors, masters, and doctoral degrees, in addition to dual degrees, certificate programs and learning tracks.

About 56% of APUS students reported that they served in the military on active duty at initial enrollment. About 55,000 military service members get tuition assistance for APUS schools. Another 16,702 use their GI Bill benefits for the schools.

== History ==
The university was founded in 1991 by Major James P. Etter (USMC, retired) as American Military University. Operations began in January 1993 with the enrollment of 18 graduate students. Initially, the main goal of the university was to meet the unique educational needs of military personnel needing courses in specialized areas, such as counterterrorism and military intelligence, that were not included in typical university course offerings. In the early years, instruction was done through conventional correspondence.

In June 1995 AMU became nationally accredited by the Accrediting Commission of the Distance Education and Training Council (DETC). In January of the following year, the school introduced its first undergraduate programs. The first online courses and online classrooms started in 1998. In 1999, all undergraduate classes and programs went fully online, with graduate programs shifting to online in 2000.

In 2002 AMU expanded to become American Public University System and established American Public University, intended primarily for civilians interested in public service programs. In 2006 APUS was granted regional accreditation from the Higher Learning Commission. In 2012 American Public University System resigned its DETC accreditation. In 2016, the university was listed as tied for 58th place in U.S. News & World Report ranking of online bachelor's degree Programs.

In July 2016, long-time president Wallace E. Boston was succeeded as APUS president by former executive vice president and provost Karan Powell, while continuing his leadership role as CEO of APEI to provide strategic and leadership support to APUS and other APEI ventures. In September 2016, Vernon Smith was named senior vice president and provost, succeeding Powell. In September 2017, Boston was reappointed APUS president. In September 2019, Angela Selden was named CEO of APEI, succeeding Boston as head of the parent company.

APUS had a partnership with Walmart from 2010 to 2019. Walmart spent $50 million on the "Lifelong Learning Program, chiefly for tuition grants for Walmart workers to 'further develop a pipeline' for leaders".

From 2013 to 2017, APUS' enrollment declined from 127,000 to 84,000 students. In 2018, APUS paid the state of Massachusetts $270,000 after an investigation by the state's attorney general into allegations that it violated the state's for-profit and occupational school regulations, which are aimed at protecting students from the deceptive and unfair business practices by for-profit schools. In July 2020, Wade Dyke, former president of Kaplan University was named president of APUS; he was replaced by long-serving APUS board chair Dr. Katherine Zatz on November 4, 2021, who was the acting president until Nuno Fernandes took over on September 1, 2022.

In October 2020, parent company APEI began the process of acquiring Rasmussen College, later named Rasmussen University.

Under the 90–10 rule, schools are required to get funds that are not federal funds. In 2021, Congress closed the loophole in the 90–10 rule that previously excluded DOD Tuition Assistance funds and GI Bill funds. The Veterans Education Project reported that American Public University System would be the largest for-profit college chain negatively affected by the modified rule.

== Governance ==
APUS is governed as a private, for-profit organization by a board of trustees, and is a subsidiary of American Public Education, Inc. Nuno Fernandes is president; Elizabeth Johnson is provost.

== Accreditation ==
APUS is accredited by the Higher Learning Commission. In 2018, the accreditation status was designated "under governmental investigation" as a result of an investigation by the Massachusetts state attorney general into deceptive and predatory recruiting practices. The investigation ended in a settlement in which APUS paid $270,000 to the state to provide relief to eligible AMU students, and has agreed to change its disclosures to prospective students, and the designation was removed.

From January 6, 1995, to April 30, 2012, the institution was accredited by the Distance Education Accrediting Commission. APUS resigned its accreditation through this organization as of April 30, 2012.

The university's School of Business is accredited by, and several business programs have specialized accreditation from, the Accreditation Council for Business Schools and Programs. The university's Bachelor of Science in nursing (RN to BSN) program is accredited by the Commission on Collegiate Nursing Education. APUS' Master of Public Health program was accredited in July 2017—retroactive to 22 July 2015—by the Council on Education for Public Health.

=== Professional recognition and affiliation ===
Select APUS programs are also affiliated with and/or recognized by such professional organizations as:

- Society for Human Resource Management
- American Sport Education Program
- Council on Education for Public Health
- National Academy of Sports Medicine
- NSA's Information Assurance Courseware Evaluation
- National Council on Family Relations
- Accreditation Council for Business Schools and Programs.

== Academics and finances ==
APUS is an open enrollment institution. The system employs approximately 410 full-time faculty members and 1,800 part-time faculty members. Full-time professors are salaried employees without tenure. APUS offers 200 degree and certificate programs across six academic schools through American Military University and American Public University, including the following:

- School of Arts and Humanities
- School of Business
- School of Education
- School of Health Sciences
- School of Science, Technology, Engineering, and Math
- School of Security and Global Studies

As well as professional certificates, associate degrees, bachelor's degrees, and master's degrees, the university now awards doctoral degrees. Beginning in May 2017, the university began awarding doctoral degrees in the following courses of study: Doctor of Global Security (DGS) and Doctor of Strategic Intelligence (DSI).

According to the National Center for Education Statistics, the 6-year graduation rate is 29%.

=== Servicemembers Opportunity Colleges ===
American Military University participated in the Servicemembers Opportunity Colleges program before it was disbanded in 2019, with eligible bachelor's degrees in Homeland Security, Intelligence Studies, Emergency and Disaster Management (Coast Guard only), Criminal Justice, Management, and Business Administration. AMU is also a Navy College Program Distance Learning Partner.

== Student outcomes ==
According to the College Scorecard, American Public University has an 8-year graduation rate of 22 percent, with a salary after completing ranging from $15,650 (AA in Human Development) to $76,460 (Bachelors in Fire Protection). Of those two years into student loan repayment, 27% were in forbearance, 21% were not making progress, 19% defaulted, 13% were in deferment, 8% were making progress, 6% were delinquent, 3% were paid in full, and 3% were discharged.

== Notable faculty ==
- Wendy B. Lawrence, retired Space Shuttle veteran and Navy aviator with 25 years of service; professor of Space Studies
- Dan Caine, 22nd Chairman of the Joint Chiefs of Staff

== Notable alumni ==
- Moses Ali Ugandan army officer and politician
- Ahmed Fouad Alkhatib, founder and executive director of Project Unified Assistance
- Nick Andersen, Acting Director of the Cybersecurity and Infrastructure Security Agency (CISA) and former Assistant Secretary of Office of Cybersecurity, Energy Security, and Emergency Response
- Anthony Angelozzi, schoolteacher, union activist and member-elect of the New Jersey Assembly
- April D. Beldo, retired U.S. Navy Fleet Master Chief, the first female Command Master Chief of an aircraft carrier and the first female Command Master Chief of Recruit Training Command
- Dan Caine, U.S. Air Force General, Chairman of the Joint Chiefs of Staff
- Eugenie Carys de Silva, known for being the youngest person to earn a Master's degree from Harvard University and youngest to win the Luce Leader Award.
- Monique Marie Chouraeshkenazi, scholar, chairwoman of the National Security Program
- Andrew Gawer, professional motorcycle road racer, former intelligence analyst and MotoAmerica Supersport competitor.
- Mike Giallombardo, Member of the Florida House of Representatives
- Yasser Harrak, Canadian writer, columnist, and human rights activist
- David Hodne, U.S. Army General and former commanding general of United States Army Transformation and Training Command
- Nicole Malachowski, U.S. Air Force Colonel and the first female pilot selected to fly as part of the USAF Air Demonstration Squadron, better known as the Thunderbirds
- Cory Mills, businessman, defense contractor, and member of the United States House of Representatives
- JoAnna Mendoza (D-AZ), member-elect of the U.S. House of Representatives
- Scott Swanson, military writer, novelist, and former intelligence advisor
- John Wills, Iowa State Representative
- Brandon Wolff, mixed martial artist, former Welterweight fighter of the Ultimate Fighting Championship and former Navy SEAL

== Educational institutions owned by American Public Education, Inc. ==
Each institution listed here is separately incorporated and accredited.

- American Public University System, which uses the brands American Military University and American Public University
- Graduate School USA
- Hondros College of Nursing
- Rasmussen University
