= Joe L. Hensley =

American novelist (1926–2007)

Personal details
- Born: March 19, 1926 Bloomington, Indiana, U.S.
- Died: August 27, 2007 (aged 81) Madison, Indiana, U.S
- Party: Republican
- Education: Indiana University Bloomington (BA, LL.B.)
- Awards: Sagamore of the Wabash

Military service
- Allegiance: United States of America
- Branch/service: United States Navy
- Rank: Journalist 3rd Class
- Battles/wars: Korean War

Joseph Louis "Joe L." Hensley (March 19, 1926 – August 27, 2007) was an American lawyer, prosecuting attorney, member of the Indiana General Assembly, circuit court judge, science fiction fan, and writer of science fiction and mysteries. He was a long-time resident of Madison, Indiana, and died there of complications of leukemia.

== Early life ==
Hensley was born in Bloomington, Indiana, and became involved in science fiction fandom by the time he was 13. He graduated from Bloomington's Indiana University High School in 1944, went into the United States Navy, serving as a Pharmacist's Mate in the Navy Hospital Corps. He served from June 1944 to July 1946. He received a Bachelor of Arts degree in 1950 from Indiana University Bloomington. On June 18, 1950, married Charlotte Ruth Bettinger in her home town of Tell City, Indiana; she died in 2000. He was again inducted into the Navy serving from March 1951 to July 1952 during the Korean War, becoming a Journalist 3rd Class. He received his L.L.B. degree from Indiana University School of Law in 1955, and moved to Madison to begin his legal practice.

== Legal career ==
He served one term in the Indiana General Assembly in 1961–1962, representing Jefferson and Scott counties. He was then elected prosecuting attorney for the Fifth Judicial Circuit, serving from 1963 to 1966. In 1975, he was appointed Judge pro tem of the Ripley Circuit Court by the Indiana Supreme Court and was subsequently elected and served two terms as Judge of the Fifth Judicial Circuit from 1977 through 1988. He served two years as president of the Indiana Judges Association. In 1998, he was named a Sagamore of the Wabash by then Indiana Governor Frank O'Bannon.

== Writing career ==
While working as a law student, lawyer, legislator and judge, Hensley wrote science fiction and crime fiction (and at least one auto-racing story for a pulp magazine) as Joe L. Hensley and Louis J. A. Adams. His first fiction sale was the short story "And Not Quite Human," published in the September 1953 issue of Beyond Fantasy Fiction. His first published novel was The Color of Hate in 1960. He had 20 more novels and collections published (over half of them in the series featuring Indiana circuit judge Donald Robak, which began with 1971's Deliver Us to Evil) and around 100 short stories. His collaborators in science fiction included Alexei Panshin and Harlan Ellison; he co-wrote one mystery novel (Loose Coins) with fellow Indiana prosecuting attorney Guy M. Townsend. His last novel, Snowbird's Blood, was published in February 2008. Many of his mystery novels were set in the fictitious Bington, a place which combined aspects of Madison and Bloomington.

== Science fiction fandom ==
Hensley remained active in science fiction fandom throughout his life; the Hensleys were familiar faces at science fiction conventions such as Rivercon and Midwestcon. Hensley was a First Fandom "Dinosaur" (which meant he had been active in fandom prior to July 4, 1939), and received the First Fandom Hall of Fame Award in 2006.

== Papers ==
Many of his papers dealing both with his career as a judge and attorney, and his activities as a writer and science fiction fan, are in the collection of the Lilly Library of Indiana University.
