= April D. Beldo =

Former US Navy Fleet Master Chief

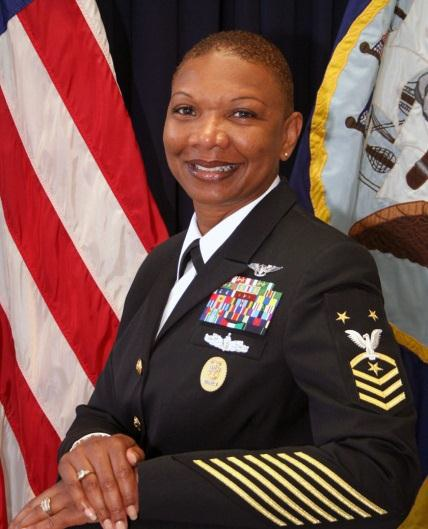
- Beldo in 2014
- Born: January 18, 1964 (age 62); Kern County, California, U.S.
- Education: Excelsior University (BS); American Military University (MA)
- Military career
- Allegiance: United States
- Branch: United States Navy
- Service years: 1983–2017
- Rank: Fleet Master Chief
- Awards: Meritorious Service Medal (4); Navy and Marine Corps Commendation Medal (3); Navy and Marine Corps Achievement Medal (3); Legion of Merit

April D. Beldo (born January 18, 1964) is a retired United States Navy sailor who served as the Fleet Master Chief for Manpower, Personnel, Training and Education (MPT&E). Over the course of her 34-year career, she served as the first woman and first African-American in multiple Navy positions, including the first female Command Master Chief of an aircraft carrier and the first female Command Master Chief for recruit training.

== Early life and education ==
Beldo was born in Kern County, California on January 18, 1964. She graduated from Desert High School, located on Edwards Air Force Base in 1982. Beldo graduated from Excelsior University with a Bachelor of Science degree and received her Master of Arts degree from American Military University in Management in August 2015.

== Naval career ==
Beldo received recruit training at the Recruit Training Center in Orlando, Florida in 1983. She completed Aviation maintenance Administrationman "A" school in Meridian, Mississippi. She served on board the aircraft carrier USS Abraham Lincoln (CVN-72) and the USS Kitty Hawk (CV-63). Beldo served with the Aviation Maintenance Management Teams (AMMT) at Commander, Naval Air Force Atlantic (CNAL), and also aboard the aircraft carrier USS George Washington (CVN-73).

In 2002, Beldo was chosen for the Command Master Chief program and graduated with honors. Her first assignment as Command Master Chief was with the destroyer USS Bulkeley (DDG-84), which lasted from May 2003 to December 2005. From April 2006 to June 2008 she served as the Command Master Chief for Recruit Training Command, the first African-American female to fill this role. In October 2009, she became the Command Master Chief for the aircraft carrier USS Carl Vinson (CVN-70), the first female Command Master Chief for an aircraft carrier.

From April 2012 to February 2013, Beldo was the Force Master Chief for Naval Education and Training Command. Starting in March 2013, Beldo became the Fleet Master Chief for Manpower, Personnel, Training and Education. Beldo served in this position until her retirement from the Navy in January 2017.

== Awards and decorations ==
Meritorious Service Medal
Navy and Marine Corps Commendation Medal
Navy and Marine Corps Achievement Medal
Legion of Merit
