= Eugenie Carys de Silva =

Youngest person to graduate from Harvard College

Dr. Eugenie Carys de Silva
- Born: June 16, 1998 (age 28); Manchester, England
- Citizenship: Dual UK and USA citizenship
- Education: American Military University (Bsc); Harvard University (Msc); University of Leicester (PhD); University of Cambridge (MPhil)
- Known for: Youngest Harvard University graduate
- Awards: 2015 Luce Leader Award
- Website: eugeniedesilva.com

Eugenie Carys de Silva is an academic known for being the youngest person to ever graduate from Harvard University. De Silva completed her master's degree in Intelligence Studies at age 16.

She previously served as Adjunct Faculty at Walters State Community College and now currently serves as senior consultant at Booz Allen Hamilton.

== Early life and education ==
De Silva was born in Manchester, England and was raised by her father, a Sri Lankan-born Physics and Chemistry Professor. She began high school at age 9 and graduated from the University of Missouri High School at the age of 11.

She graduated with a bachelor's degree in Intelligence Analysis (summa cum laude) from the American Military University at 14 years old and completed a master's degree in Intelligence Studies from the Harvard University at 16 years old, the youngest ever to do so. She also holds a master's degree in Intelligence Studies from the American Military University.

At the age of 15, de Silva enrolled at the University of Leicester seeking to become a Doctor of Philosophy, the youngest to do so.

She later earned Master of Philosophy in Education, Globalization, & International Development from Faculty of Education at University of Cambridge. She also served as a member of Churchill College, Cambridge where she has acted as the internal social secretary for the graduate students.

== Awards and recognition ==
At the age of 7, de Silva won the Virginia State Award from Johns Hopkins University.

In 2014, she was featured as one of the 30 Thinkers Under 30 by the Pacific Standard Magazine.

In 2015, she won the Luce Leader Award, the youngest ever to do so.
