= Spirit of Jefferson =

- Type: Weekly newspaper
- Format: Broadsheet
- Publisher: Craig See
- Founded: 1844
- Headquarters: 114 N Charles St. Charles Town, WV 25414
- Circulation: 4,200 (as of 2016)
- Sister newspapers: Hampshire Review
- OCLC number: 12889829
- Website: spiritofjefferson.com

Spirit of Jefferson is an independent, weekly newspaper covering Charles Town and Jefferson County, West Virginia. Originally two separate papers, The Spirit of Jefferson, first published in 1844, and The Farmer's Advocate, first published in 1890. were both sold to Ralph Dorsey in 1935. In 1948, the two papers were merged. It is the longest-running newspaper in West Virginia.
