= Monique Marie Chouraeshkenazi =

American professor

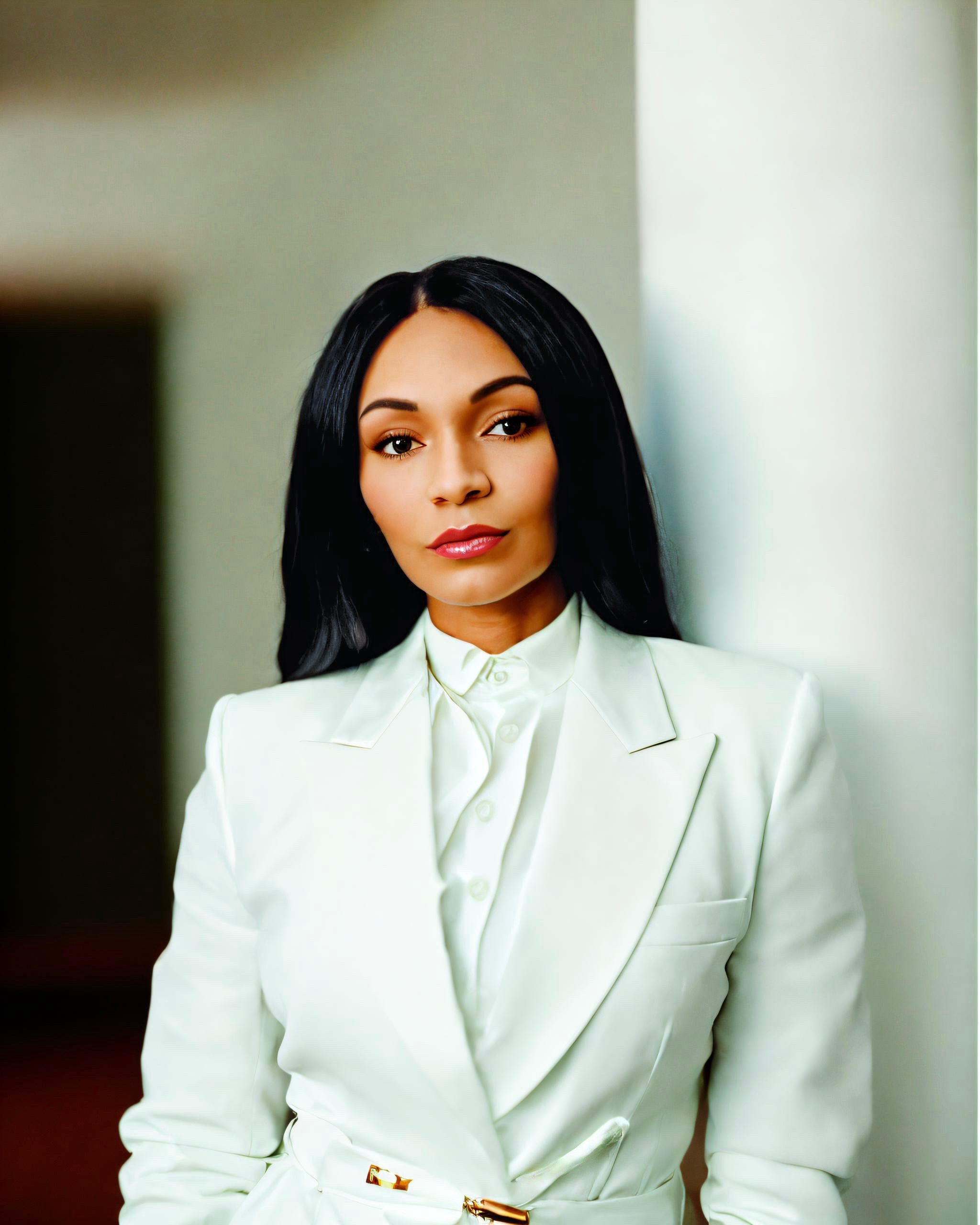
- Born: November 6, 1983 (age 42); Bridgeport, Connecticut, U.S.
- Allegiance: United States
- Branch: United States Air Force
- Service years: 2002–2015
- Rank: Technical Sergeant
- Conflicts: Operation Enduring Freedom
- Other work: Professor specializing in homeland and national security

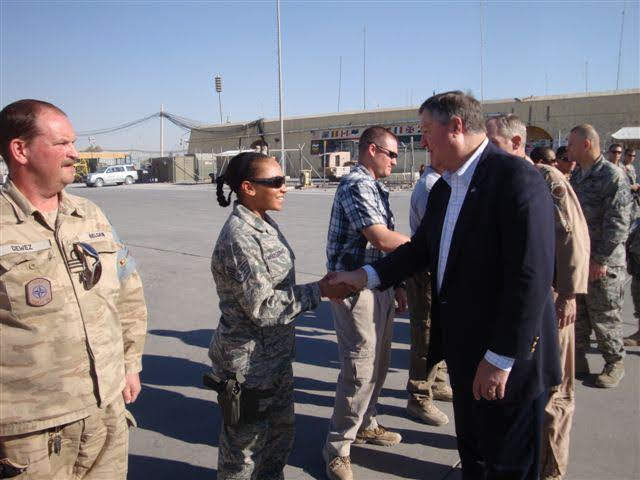
Chouraeshkenazi shaking hands with 22nd Secretary of the Air Force, Michael B. Donley at Kandahar Airfield, Afghanistan, November 27, 2010.

Monique Marie Chouraeshkenazi (born November 6, 1983) is an American clinical neuropsychometrician, scientist, author, and professor. She currently serves as a full-time professor at American Military University (AMU). Previously, she was an associate professor of psychology, biopsychology, and cognitive psychology at AMU. She has also held the position of full professor and chairwoman of national security at the Daniel Morgan School of National Security (DMGS) in Washington, DC. She is the founder and chief neuropsychometrician of the Chouraeshkenazi Group.

In 2019, Chouraeshkenazi developed the nation's first "Ensuring Data Security" course at the George Washington University's Graduate School of Political Management in response to the Russian interference in the 2016 United States elections. Prior to this, she was an associate professor for the School of Security and Global Studies at American Military University.

Knowledgeable in advanced scientific terrorism notations and homeland and national security methodologies, Chouraeshkenazi specializes in domestic extremism and global terrorism.

== Early life and education ==
Chouraeshkenazi received her early education at Pratt Elementary School in Pratt, West Virginia, and graduated with honors from Riverside High School in Belle, West Virginia, in 2002. She holds an Associate of Applied Science (A.A.S.) degree in Information Resource Management from the Community College of the Air Force and a Bachelor of Arts (B.A.) degree in Homeland Security from American Military University. Subsequently, she obtained a Master of Criminal Justice degree from Boston University and a career diploma in Private Investigation from Penn Foster College.

In 2015, Chouraeshkenazi completed her doctoral studies, earning a Ph.D. in Public Policy and Administration with high honors from Walden University, with a concentration in Terrorism, Mediation, and Peace. Her doctoral dissertation is titled Qualitative Case Study on F-35 Fighter Production Delays Affecting National Security Guidance. Additionally, she holds a Master of Arts (M.A.) degree in Psychology from American Military University and a Master of Science (M.S.) degree in Clinical Psychopharmacology from the Chicago School of Professional Psychology.

Further, Chouraeshkenazi accomplished her second doctorate in clinical psychology, specializing in Forensic Neuropsychopathology from California Southern University. Her clinical dissertation, Forensic Neuropsychopathological Analysis on Altered Brain Structures in Combat Veterans: A Systematic Review, was published by Taylor and Francis' F1000 Research.

== Career ==
=== Military service ===
Chouraeshkenazi is a 13-year combat veteran of the U.S. Air Force. She was Chief of the Special Security Office for the 18th Wing Intelligence Unit at Kadena Air Base, Japan; she served as the Enlisted Military Assistant and Assistant Noncommissioned Officer-in-Charge at The Pentagon, and the Military Executive Assistant for the Joint Improvised Explosive Device Defeat Organization.

Her military honors include two Joint Service Commendation Medals, a Joint Meritorious Medal, two Air Force Commendation Medals, and two Air Force Achievement Medals. Her service and campaign medals include a National Defense Service Medal, Afghanistan Campaign Medal with gold star, Global War on Terrorism Service Medal, Korean Defense Service Medal, Air Force Expeditionary Service Medal with gold border, NATO Service Medal, and Office of Secretary of Defense Badge. She was named Contributor of the Year in the Pacific Air Forces, 5th Air Force and 18th Wing Air Force Intelligence, Surveillance, and Reconnaissance, for her contributions to security and intelligence.

=== Academic positions ===
As of 2022, Chouraeshkenazi has served as the associate professor of psychology, biopsychology, and cognitive psychology at American Military University. She also works as an affiliate professor for the Graduate Criminal Justice and Social Sciences Programs at Tiffin University. American Military University and In Homeland Security News featured Chouraeshkenazi in From the Air Force to AMU: A Success Story, highlighting her transition from the military to the classroom.

She teaches over 25 courses at the undergraduate and graduate levels in criminal justice, diplomacy, homeland/national security, intelligence, international security, legal ethics, political geography, psychology, public policy, research, security management, and terrorism. Proficient in national and homeland security matters, Chouraeshkenazi provides programs for universities and professional military development centers.

In March 2019, she became Chair of the National Security Program and Professor of National Security at Daniel Morgan Graduate School of National Security. Chouraeshkenazi oversees the national security division, preparing graduates for positions in National Security agencies and departments, law enforcement organizations, civil governance bodies and corporations. She also oversees the department's budget, curriculum development programs, independent studies, school committees, and student academic advisory programs.

== Selected publications ==
In January 2018, Chouraeshkenazi published Homeland & National Security: Understanding America's Past to Protect the Future, which identifies overlapping and distinctive responsibilities of the American federal government and how the U.S. Armed Forces protects the homeland, its territories, and resources.

The 32nd United States Deputy Secretary of Defense, Robert O. Work wrote:

This book covers a lot of complex subjects in a digestible, understandable way. Dr. Chouraeshkenazi methodically reviews how the uniquely American concepts of national security and homeland security have evolved both before and after the birth of our Republic. She then develops and explains how the two concepts intersect and overlap, especially since the terrible tragedy of September 11, 2001. By so doing, she suggests ways by which we might better confront emerging 21st-century threats to American security.

— Robert Work

In June 2018, Chouraeshkenazi co-edited an anthology with Kyle Kattelman and Francis Boateng, Terrorism: Strategical & Methodological Approaches.
