= Scott Swanson (military) =

- Born: Chicago, United States
- Other name: J.T. Patten (fiction writer)
- Education: Illinois State University, American Public University System, American Military University, University of St. Andrews
- Occupation: Author
- Known for: Special Warfare intelligence and doctrine; Dark Fiction

Scott Swanson, pen name J.T. Patten, is an American military writer, novelist, lyric songwriter, and former intelligence advisor. He is notable for his work in military Special Warfare intelligence, and is featured in Montgomery McFate's book Military Anthropology: Soldiers, Scholars and Subjects at the Margins of Empire and Steve Coll's book, Directorate S: The C.I.A. and America’s Secret Wars in Afghanistan and Pakistan.

Professionally, Scott is Aon (company)'s Cyber Security Advisory Practice Leader. Prior, he worked as a financial crimes investigator for PwC's Financial Crimes Unit. Formerly, he has worked as a government intelligence operative. He specializes in socio-cultural intelligence and Irregular warfare and which covers operational considerations, focusing on Africa, the Middle East, and Southeast Asia regions.

== Biography ==
Scott grew up in Chicago and graduated with a degree in foreign languages from the Illinois State University. Later, he received a master’s degree from the American Military University.

== Bibliography ==
=== U.S. Army Publications ===
- Swanson, Scott; Lieutenant General Boykin, William. Operationalizing Intelligence Special Warfare Bulletin, U.S. Army John F. Kennedy Special Warfare Center and School (SWCS).
- Swanson, Scott (2006). "Asymmetrical Factors in Culture for SOF Conflicts: Gaining Understanding and Insights". Military Intelligence Professional Bulletin. 32 (2): 29–33. ProQuest 1016232480.
- Swanson, Scott (2007). "Know Your Enemy: Human Intelligence Key to SOF Missions". Special Warfare. 20 (1): 16–24. ProQuest 199436147.

=== Novels ===
- Patten, J.T. (2013). Safe Havens Series: Shadow Masters, A Sean Havens Black Ops Thriller (Book 1)
- Patten, J.T. (2016). Safe Havens Series: Primed Charge, A Sean Havens Black Ops Thriller (Book 2)
- Patten, J.T. (2018). Buried in Black: A Task Force Orange Novel (Book 1)
- Patten, J.T. (2019). The Presence of Evil: A Task Force Orange Novel Book 2)
- Patten, J.T. (2020). Safe Havens Series: Presidential Retreat, A Sean Havens Black Ops Thriller (Book 3)
- Patten, J.T. (2021). Safe Havens Series: Shadow Masters Reloaded: A Sean Havens Black Ops Thriller (Second Release, Book 1)
- Patten, J.T. (2022). Whispers of a Gypsy (Horror)
- Patten, J.T. (2023). Brothers of Blood: A New Orleans Haunts Novella (Vampire Horror)
- Patten, J.T. (2023). Lone Woolf Series: Buried in Black, A Drake Woolf Black Ops Thriller, (Second Release, Book 1)
- Patten, J.T. (2023). Lone Woolf Series: The Presence of Evil: A Drake Woolf Black Ops Thriller (Second Release, Book 2)
- Patten, J.T. (2023). Howl of the Hunted: A New Orleans Haunts Novella (Werewolf / Rougarou Horror) by Tantor Media

=== Military / Security Publications ===
- Grange, David; as "Patten, J.T." Assessing and Targeting Illicit Funding in Conflict Ecosystems
- Swanson, Scott. Cyber Threat Indications & Warning: Predict, Identify and Counter
- Swanson, Scott. Improving Asymmetrical Insights with Cultural Understanding
- Swanson, Scott. Indications and Warning Post 9/11: Analyzing Enemy Intent
- Swanson, Scott, Red Team Improvements
- Swanson, Scott. Terrorism and Third Party Combatants: Iran, Venezuela and Hezbollah
- Swanson, Scott. Viral Targeting of the IED Social Network System
- Swanson, Scott. The Role of Fraud Examinations in Cybercrime

=== Lifestyle and Gun Publications ===
- Patten, J.T. WHISKEY TANGO FOXTROT Ballistic Magazine, 2023
- Patten, J.T. SHOOT AND WRITE TO THRILL Tactical Life Magazine, 2023
- Patten, J.T. CONCEALED CARRY GUIDE Personal Defense Weapons, 2023
- Patten, J.T. COOL VS STRANGE Personal Defense Weapons, 2023
- Patten, J.T. HIGH STEAKS DEBATE Ballistic Magazine, 2023
- Patten, J.T. DEADPOOLISH WICK DWX Combat Handguns Magazine, 2023
- Patten, J.T. LONE WOOLF STORIES Parts 1-4, Tactical Life Magazine, 2023
- Patten, J.T. GRAVY SEALS Personal Defense World Magazine, 2023

=== Music Writing and Lyric Publishing Production ===
- Patten, J.T. (2023). TACKLEBOX (See You Again) Lone Woolf Lyrics, Lone Woolf Publishing (ASCAP)
- Patten, J.T. (2023). DARK RIDERS Lone Woolf Lyrics, Lone Woolf Publishing (ASCAP) with Gary Cubberley (BMI), Composer, Arranger, and Producer; Songbayteam Band; Songtrust Blvd Publisher
- Patten, J.T. (2023). PREACHERMAN Lone Woolf Lyrics, Lone Woolf Publishing (ASCAP)

=== Interviews ===
- Patten, J.T. (2021) J.T. Patten - Shadow Masters (Reloaded), House of Mystery Radio on NBC
- Patten, J.T. (2022) Intel Contractor Pens Story on America's Most Secretive Unit, Connecting Vets
- Patten, J.T. (2022) J.T. Patten - Whispers of a Gypsy, House of Mystery Radio on NBC
