= University of Missouri High School =

Distance learning school in Missouri, United States

Information
- Established: 1999; 26 years ago
- Grades: K-12
- Affiliation: University of Missouri

The University of Missouri High School (MU High School) is a distance-learning K-12 high school administered by the University of Missouri, a public state university located in Columbia, Missouri and the flagship of the University of Missouri System. The program was founded in 1999 as part of the university's Center for Distance and Independent Study (CDIS). Its mission is to provide learning opportunities in addition to traditional high schools. The school offers more than 150 courses by certified Missouri teachers, from the elementary through high school levels. Each year, thousands of students enroll in high school to succeed in their home high schools and other settings.

== History ==
MU High School was established and accredited by the NCA in 1999 as a program of the University of Missouri's Center for Distance and Independent Study (CDIS). The launch of MU High School was part of a broader trend of university-affiliated online high schools started by brick-and-mortar universities like Stanford University's Stanford University Online High School and Indiana University Bloomington's Indiana University High School. As of 2011, 85 students graduate from the high school annually according to The New York Times.

The Center for Distance and Independent Study ("the Center") began by offering university correspondence courses and belonged to the university's Extension Division—a logical fit in this land-grant university hierarchy. Historical records show that the Center offered high school courses as early as 1913.

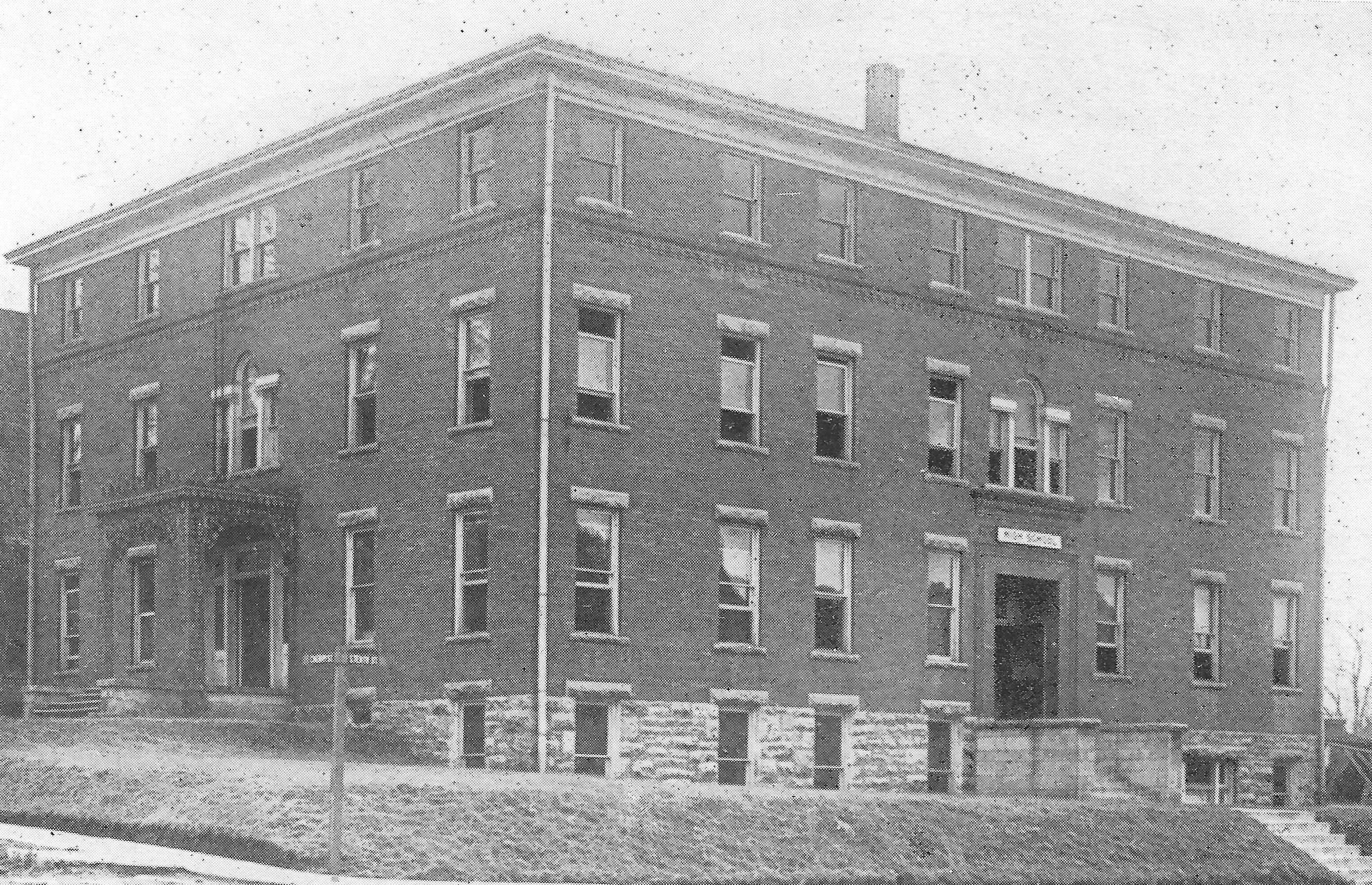
University High School in 1911

At one time, MU had a bricks-and-mortar school that combined high school and elementary school divisions in a single K-12 private school known as the Laboratory School. The elementary school division operated from 1857 until 1978, and until 1904 constituted the entire Laboratory School. The high school division, known as the Teachers College High School, was added in 1904 and operated until 1973.

The 1970s brought the use of technology and the telephone to submit lessons via the Computer Assisted Lesson Service (CALS). CALS, a precursor of today's online independent study courses, was a method of grading objectively scored lessons by having students submit answers via a phone line. The Center received the National University Continuing Education Association's (NUCEA) Significant Achievement Award in 1985 for its use of technology in independent study.

Although the University of Missouri had offered high school-level independent study courses since at least 1913, those courses were only used as transfer credit to another institution. Establishing MU High School in 1999 as an accredited diploma-granting high school enabled CDIS to provide students in Missouri and elsewhere with a complete program, as well as to fulfill the university's land-grant mission in new ways.

The MU High School recently merged with Mizzou K-12 Online in order to offer more courses to online students.

== Accreditation ==
MU High School is accredited by AdvancED and the North Central Association Commission on Accreditation and School Improvement (NCA CASI). Under accreditation guidelines, MUHS has an ongoing school improvement plan and submits an annual report to renew accreditation.

== Impact ==
University of Missouri High School has allowed non-traditional students, home schooled students, and others to achieve high school educations where they otherwise might not. Students with athletic or acting careers are often unable to participate in traditional schools. High school students at Mayatan Bilingual School in Copán Ruinas, Honduras were able to receive American diplomas through MU High School, completing some tests and coursework online.

== Notable alumni ==
- Gracie Gold, an American figure skater
- Lindsey Vonn, former American World Cup alpine ski racer on the US Ski Team
- Eugenie Carys de Silva, the youngest person to ever graduate from Harvard University

== See also ==
- University of Nebraska High School
