= New Opera House (Charles Town, West Virginia) =

- The Old Opera House
- U.S. National Register of Historic Places
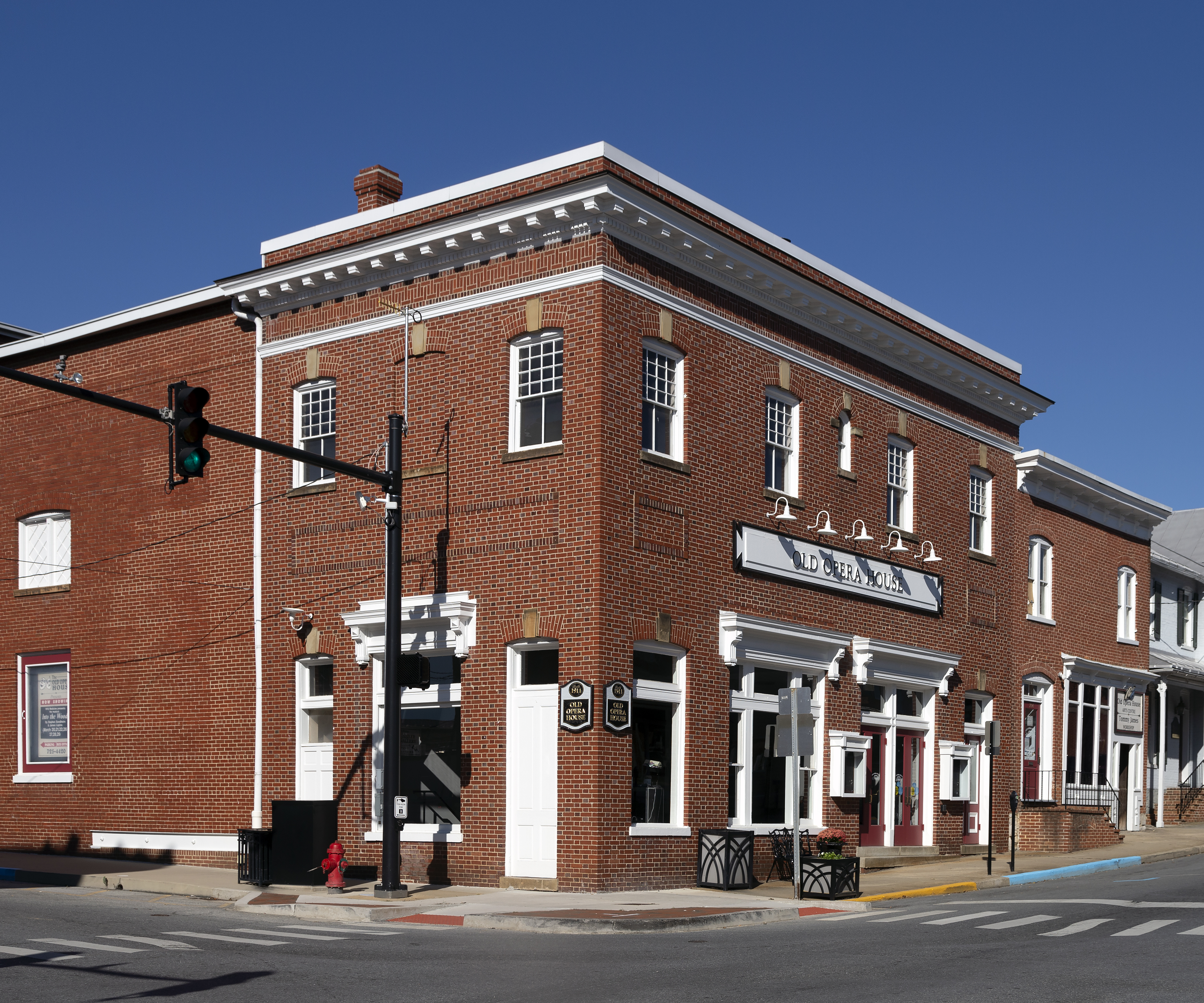
- Opera House in 2020

- Location within West Virginia Location within the United States
- Location: 200–204 N. George St., Charles Town, West Virginia
- Coordinates: 39°17′23″N 77°51′39″W
- Built: 1911
- Architect: T.A. Mullett
- NRHP reference No.: 78002798
- Added to NRHP: November 24, 1978

The Old Opera House is located in the Shenandoah Valley in Charles Town, West Virginia, once known as the New Opera House or simply The Opera House, is a restored theater, designed by T.A. Mullett of Washington, D.C., son of architect Alfred B. Mullett. The theater opened in 1911, bringing minstrel shows, vaudeville, touring theater groups, circuses and wild west shows to Charles Town. By the 1930s a projection machine was installed, but the theater closed in 1948. It has since re-opened as a community-supported performance space.

The building consists of a two-story street front with offices on the second floor in an old apartment building, pre-dating the theater portion by about twenty years. The house and stage occupy the interior of the lot.
