= Indiana University High School =

Location
- 408 N. Union Street; Bloomington, Indiana 47408; United States; 39°10′9.51″N 86°30′30.56″W

Information
- Type: Online university high school
- Motto: "Lux et Veritas" (Light and Truth)
- Established: 1925
- School district: MCCSC
- Director: Mike Beam
- Staff: 9
- Faculty: 29
- Grades: 7-12
- Colors: Cream and crimson
- Nickname: Hoosiers
- Accreditation: NCA CASI
- Website: https://iuhighschool.iu.edu/

Indiana University High School (IUHS) is a co-educational, non-denominational, distance education high school with its offices located on the campus of Indiana University Bloomington, in Bloomington, Indiana, United States. It serves students around the world and provides individual courses and diploma programs to students, online or through the mail. IUHS also offers student services, such as career counselling and "life experience credits" for non-academic achievement. Indiana University High School is the founding member of the Indiana Virtual Learning Consortium and was ranked as the "second best online high school" by The Best Schools. IUHS is a 21st Century Scholarship School.

== History ==
During 1925, Indiana University High School began offering distance education courses by paper-mail, to high school students throughout the United States. During 1999, Indiana University formally decided to establish a distance education high school, which provided the traditional paper-mail method and modernized online distance education. Today, IUHS has around 1,925 students and 29 faculty members. During 2011, IUHS moved to 408 N. Union Street, within the offices of the Student Academic Center and the Office of the Registrar. Indiana University High School maintains networking capability through the IU Communications Building, located at Kirkwood Avenue.

== Academics ==
Indiana University High School offers a general education diploma, college prep diploma and an academic honors diploma. To graduate with a diploma from IUHS, a student must complete at least 40 credits, 10 of which must be taken at IUHS. The 40 credit minimum does not apply to a college prep diploma, or academic honors diploma; it represents the minimum number of credits which students need to graduate.

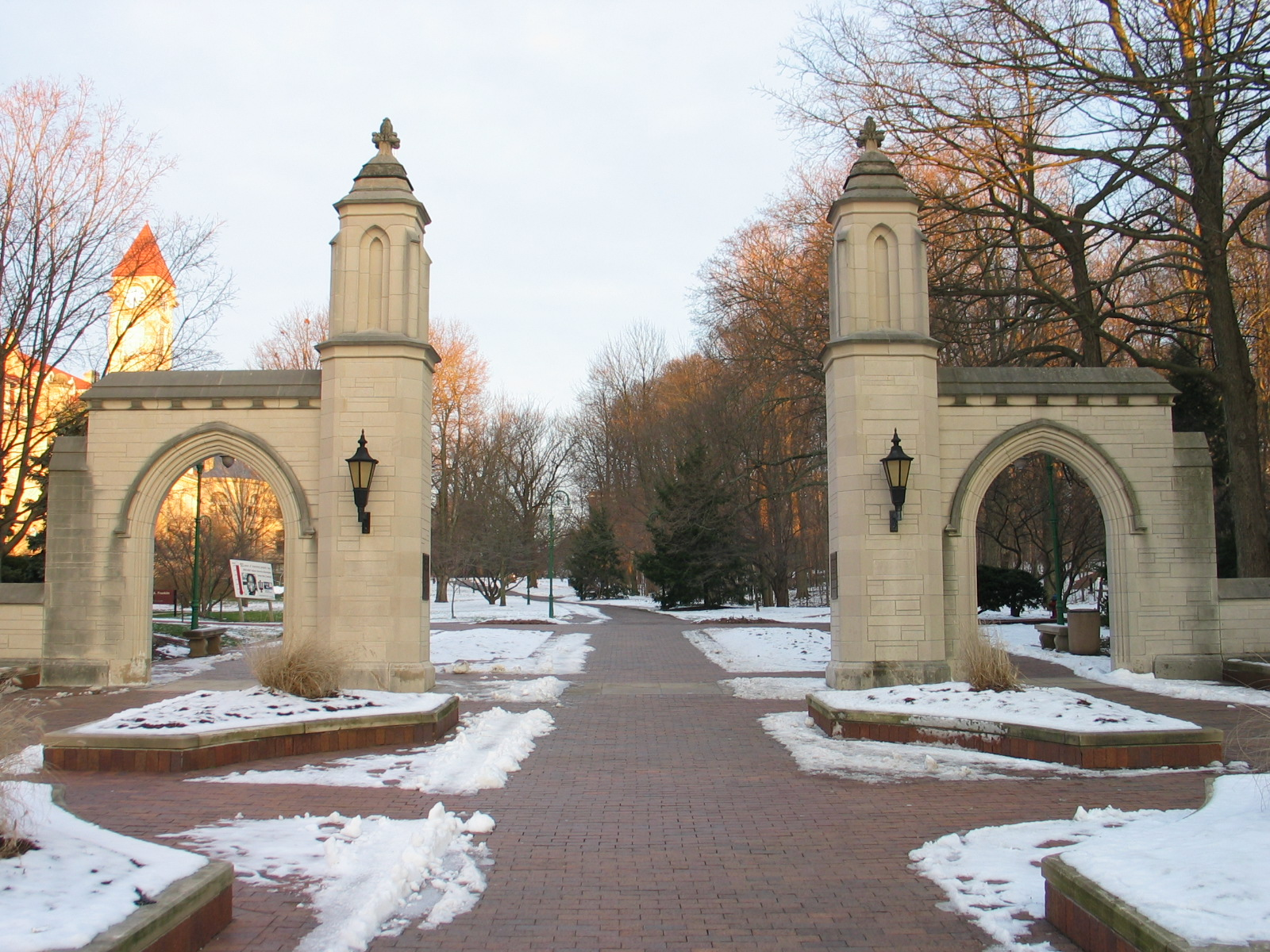
The Sample Gates at IU Bloomington, where IUHS is located

Indiana University offers more than 72 courses, spanning 13 different disciplines.

== Tuition ==
When applying to IUHS, students must pay a $40 application fee and (if eligible) a $10 transcript fee. Each course costs $231.00, but students will incur additional charges:

- $65 per course for service and technology
- $27 per course for study and access
- $30 per course for overseas airmail (if eligible)

Forty credits equate to approximately $11600.00 for the average American student; all prices are in USD.

Various financial aid options are available.

== Notable alumni ==
- David Boudia
- Joe L. Hensley, 1944, judge
- Conrad Tao, pianist, graduated in spring 2011

== See also ==
- Stanford University Online High School
- University of Missouri High School
- University of Nebraska – Lincoln Independent Study High School
