= University of Nebraska High School =

Coordinates: 40°49′13″N 96°41′57″W

Location
- 1500 U Street, Suite 200; Lincoln, Nebraska

Information
- Type: University-based online high school
- Established: 1929; 97 years ago
- Grades: 9–12
- Accreditation: Nebraska Department of Education, Cognia
- Website: https://highschool.nebraska.edu/

University of Nebraska High School (UNHS) is an accredited, university-based online high school institution operated by the University of Nebraska system. It offers distance education high school courses, allowing its students to earn high school credit or a diploma from anywhere in the world.

== History ==
University of Nebraska High School was established by the University of Nebraska in 1929. Initially courses were paper-based, correspondence study. With the arrival of the internet, the high school's curriculum evolved into an online learning environment. After several decades as the University of Nebraska–Lincoln Independent Study High School, UNHS was brought under the control of the University of Nebraska system as part of its online initiative in July 2013; the school's name was changed to University of Nebraska High School.

University of Nebraska High School now offers more than 100 core, elective and Advanced Placement courses in eight subject areas. Courses are provided online and in print, designed to be flexible and self-paced. With students in all fifty U. S. states and more than 100 countries, the University of Nebraska High School has delivered hundreds of thousands of courses.

== Accreditation ==
University of Nebraska High School has been accredited by the Nebraska Department of Education since 1967 and Cognia (formerly AdvancEd) since 1978, and is approved by the National Collegiate Athletic Association for students seeking athletic eligibility. Advanced Placement courses are approved by the College Board.

Under Nebraska law, UNHS is classified as a school district.

== Notable alumni ==
- Shane Gersich
- Andy Roddick
- Britney Spears
- Justin Timberlake

== See also ==
- Indiana University High School
- Stanford Online High School
- University of Missouri High School
