= Wallace E. Boston Jr. =

American businessman

Wallace Boston

President Emeritus of the American Public University System
- Incumbent
- Assumed office September 2017 (interim)
- In office June 2004 – July 2016
- Succeeded by: Karan Powell

Personal details
- Education: Duke University (AB); Tulane University (MBA); University of Pennsylvania (EdD)

Wallace E. Boston Jr. is an American academic administrator and businessman, who is president emeritus of the American Public University System, having been president from 2004 to 2016, and from September 2017 through August 2020.

Boston was CEO of American Public Education, Inc. (APEI), the parent company of American Public University System (APUS), from 2004 through September 2019.

Boston led APEI when it went public with its initial public offering on Nasdaq in 2007, on two secondary stock offerings in 2007 and 2008, and during its 2013 acquisition of Hondros College of Nursing. He led the company at a time when it was ranked repeatedly in the top ten “America's Best Small Public Companies” by Forbes (#9 in 2009; #3 in 2010; #2 in 2011; #3 in 2012).

== Education ==
Boston earned an AB in History from Duke University with minors in English and German, an MBA in marketing and accounting from Tulane University, and a Doctorate in higher education management from the University of Pennsylvania., where he submitted a dissertation entitled, “Measuring Student Retention at an Online Institution of Higher Education.”

== Career ==
Prior to Joining APUS, Boston was CFO of Sun Healthcare Group from August 2001 to February 2002, and Principal Financial Officer in March 2002. He was hired to restructure the company, implementing cost reductions, an exit financing package and a reorganization plan three months after joining the company. He was previously president and CEO of NeighborCare Pharmacies from November 1999 to May 2001, where he led a Chapter 11 bankruptcy filing of the parent company. As executive VP and COO from July 1998 to November 1999, he led a team that integrated the acquisition of Vitalink Pharmacy Services, Inc.

From April 1996 to May 1998, Boston was senior VP for acquisitions and development of Manor Care, Inc. In addition, he managed a team of six acquisition specialists purchasing standalone skilled nursing and assisted living facilities. As VP of Finance from March 1993 to April 1996, he initiated a company-wide reengineering of major financial and operating processes. He also created and managed an internal contract therapy (PT, OT, and ST) company. As VP of Finance and CFO for Meridian Healthcare, Inc. from November 1985 to November 1992, he was responsible for obtaining debt and equity financing for all acquisition and development projects. He managed a public LLC spin-off of part of the company, and was given operating responsibility for its laboratory, shared services, and pharmacy companies.

Boston was previously senior VP of real estate acquisitions and syndications for National Realty Services, Inc., from November 1984 to November 1985, where he obtained SEC registration for offerings and conducted road shows for investors. As senior VP of finance and CFO from November 1983 to November 1984, he oversaw all financial operations of the startup company, including implementing financial reporting and accounting systems, investor reporting packages and structuring financial projections for tax strategies and related offerings.

From November 1978 to November 1983, Boston was manager of management advisory services for PricewaterhouseCoopers, where he provided financial and tax analysis of mergers and acquisitions for a diversified clientele, and was a founding member of its national personal computer management consulting advisory committee.

=== American Public University System ===
He joined APUS as executive VP and CFO in September 2002, and was promoted to president and CEO in June 2004. In that role, and as a member of the APUS Board of Trustees, he led efforts to achieve Title IV participation and regional accreditation with the Higher Learning Commission of the North Central Association in 2006, and also to achieve specialty accreditation for certain degree programs such as business administration. Boston guided APUS through its accreditation with the Higher Learning Commission of the North Central Association in 2006, and in 2007, he led APEI to a successful initial public offering on the NASDAQ Exchange. In 2010, Boston was interviewed by the New York Times for striking a strategic agreement for APUS to provide distance education services for Walmart Associates.

During his tenure, the university grew from 10,000 students to approximately 100,000 alumni worldwide, and 250 degree and certificate programs. His leadership has been instrumental in APUS's receiving multiple recognitions for academic quality and effective practices in online education by U.S. News & World Report and the Online Learning Consortium, among many other respected national organizations. In addition, he was a charter signer of the American College and University Presidents’ Climate Commitment initiative which has driven APUS's ongoing green building construction and energy conservation practices in the greater Charles Town and Ranson, WV communities.

In July 2016, Boston was succeeded as APUS president by former executive vice president and provost, Karan Powell, while continuing his leadership role as CEO of APEI to provide strategic and leadership support to APUS, Hondros College of Nursing, and other APEI ventures. In April 2017, he was named APUS President Emeritus. In September 2017, Dr. Boston was reappointed APUS president after the resignation of Dr. Karan Powell. In September 2019, Angela Selden was named CEO of APEI, succeeding Boston, who remained APUS president until his planned retirement in August 2020.

== Affiliations, licenses and outside activities ==
Boston is a member of the National Advisory Panel for the National Institute for Learning Outcomes Assessment (NILOA). He was a member of the advisory council of the University Professional and Continuing Education Association (UPCEA) Center for Online Leadership and Strategy and Arizona State University's Education Innovation Conference, as well as a member of the WV Governor's Advisory Council on Technology in Education. In addition, he also was a board member of Avalere Healthcare LLC, Education Design Studio Inc. (EDSI), Overseers of University of Pennsylvania Graduate School of Education (Penn GSE) and the Presidents’ Forum of Excelsior College.
