= Hondros College of Nursing =

American private nursing college

Hondros College of Nursing is a private, for-profit college that focuses on nursing education with locations in Indiana, Michigan and Ohio. It has one campus in Indianapolis, Indiana, and Bingham Farms, Michigan (a suburb of Detroit) as well as six campuses in Ohio: Akron, Cincinnati (West Chester), Cleveland (Independence), Columbus (Westerville), Dayton and Toledo (Maumee).

== History ==
Hondros College of Nursing was founded in 1981 as a real estate preparatory school. The school began offering Practical Nursing diplomas and associate degrees in Nursing in 2006 beginning at the West Chester campus. The programs were subsequently expanded to the Westerville, Fairborn, and Independence campuses.

In 2011, Hondros College of Nursing received authority from the Ohio Board of Regents to confer bachelor's degrees. The online RN-BSN completion program welcomed its first inaugural class in October 2011. In May 2013, the baccalaureate of science in nursing (BSN) degree at Hondros College of Nursing became accredited by the Commission on Collegiate Nursing Education. After its acquisition by APEI, HCN discontinued its RN-BSN completion program.

On November 1, 2013, Hondros College of Nursing was acquired by American Public Education, Inc. (APEI) providing additional resources to advance the mission of the College. The real estate and other business programs remain through Hondros College of Business, which is a separate, unrelated organization.

In 2016, Hondros College introduced a concept-based curriculum and realistic, innovative lab simulation experiences to enhance the education and preparedness of nursing students at all campuses.

HCN opened a new campus in Maumee, a suburb of Toledo, in 2017, before expanding to Indianapolis in 2020 and Akron in 2021. The college opened its Bingham Farms campus in 2022 and moved its Dayton-area campus from Fairborn into Dayton city limits in 2023.

== Academics ==
Hondros College of Nursing offers an associate degree in Nursing program that prepares students to become a Registered Nurse. It's Practical Nursing Diploma prepares students to become a Licensed Practical Nurse, while the Medical Assisting Diploma leads students towards a career as a Medical Assistant.

The college is institutionally accredited by the Accrediting Bureau of Health Education Schools (ABHES) to award diplomas and academic associate degrees. In 2024, ABHES approved HCN's medical assisting diploma program.

State approvals for Hondros College of Nursing include the Ohio Board of Nursing for the Practical Nursing and associate degree in Nursing programs. Hondros College of Nursing is registered with State Board of Career Colleges and Schools.

In 2018, Hondros College of Nursing's Practical Nursing program was awarded programmatic accreditation from the National League for Nursing Commission for Nursing Education Accreditation (CNEA).

== Locations ==
Hondros College of Nursing's main campus is located in Westerville, Ohio (40°05′03.6″N 82°54′04.4″W) with five additional campuses in Ohio (Akron, Dayton, Independence, Maumee and West Chester) and additional campuses in Detroit, Michigan and Indianapolis, Indiana.
