= Charles Town, West Virginia =

City in West Virginia, US

- City
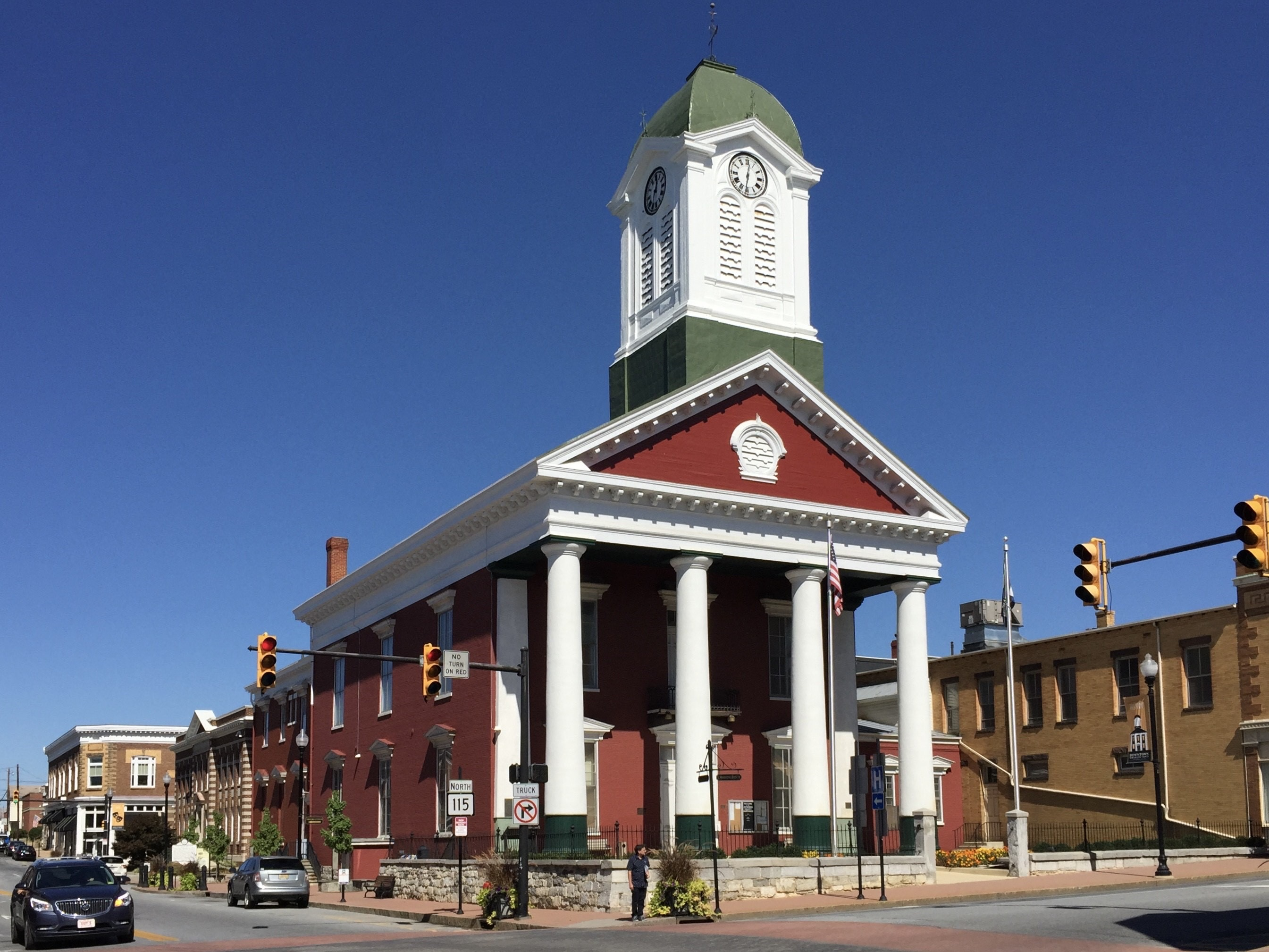
- Jefferson County Courthouse

- Flag Seal
- Interactive map of Charles Town, West Virginia
- Location within West Virginia Location within the United States
- Coordinates: 39.26401°N 77.881276°W
- Country: United States
- State: West Virginia
- County: Jefferson
- Founded: 1786
- Named for: Charles Washington

Government
  - Type: Council–manager
  - Mayor: Micheal George

Area
  - City: 5.866 sq mi (15.192 km^{2})
  - Land: 5.866 sq mi (15.192 km^{2})
  - Water: 0 sq mi (0.000 km^{2}) 0.0%
- Elevation: 460 ft (140 m)

Population (2020)
  - City: 6,534
  - Estimate (2024): 8,869
  - Density: 1,512.1/sq mi (583.81/km^{2})
  - Urban: 21,569
  - Metro: 6,436,489
- Time zone: UTC–5 (Eastern (EST))
  - Summer (DST): UTC–4 (EDT)
- ZIP Code: 25414
- Area codes: 304 and 681
- FIPS code: 54-14610
- GNIS feature ID: 2390574
- Website: charlestownwv.us

Charles Town is a city in Jefferson County, West Virginia, United States, and its county seat. The population was 6,534 at the 2020 census, and was estimated to be 8,869 in 2024. The city is named for its founder Charles Washington, youngest brother of President George Washington. It is part of the northwestern fringes of the Washington metropolitan area.

== History ==
=== 18th century ===
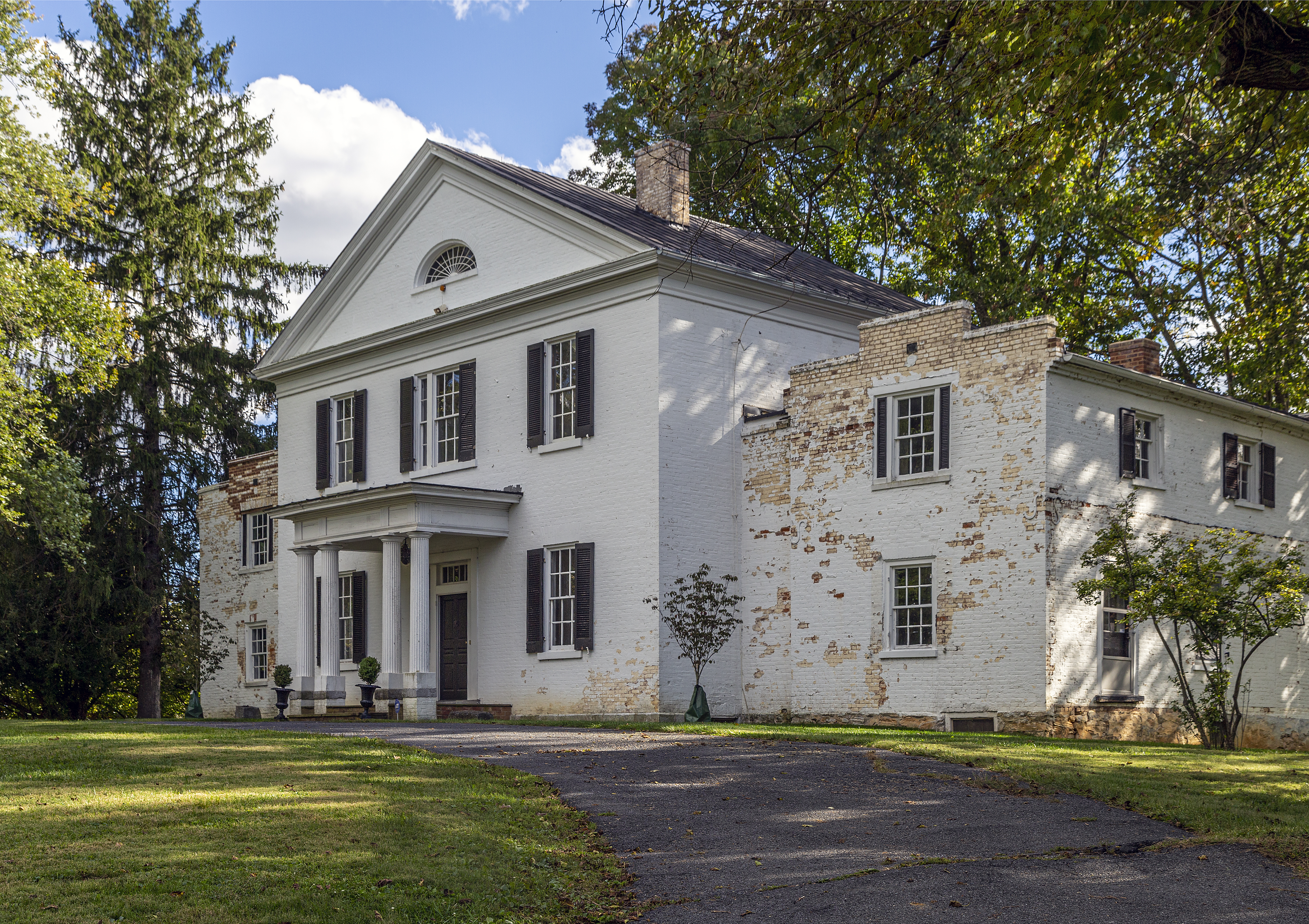
The Happy Retreat estate was owned and developed by Charles Washington.

"Charlestown" was established by an act of the Virginia General Assembly in January 1787. However, for about two decades, confusion arose because the same name was also used for a town established in Ohio County at the mouth of Buffalo Creek and authorized in the 1791 term of that local court. That area in 1797 became known as Brooke County, with that "Charlestown" as its county seat until a December 27, 1816 act of the Virginia General Assembly changed its name to Wellsburg, to honor a trader and his son.

Charles Washington, the founder of Charles Town, was born in Hunting Creek, now Fairfax County, Virginia, on May 2, 1738. He was the youngest full brother of George Washington. He came to what is today Jefferson County between April and October 1780. The estate of Charles Washington, Happy Retreat, was erected in 1780. In 1786, on 80 acres (320,000 m^{2}) of his adjoining land, Charles laid out the streets of Charles Town, naming many of them after his brothers and one after his wife, Mildred. He donated the four corner lots at the intersection of George and Washington Streets for public buildings of the town and county, provided the town become the seat of the county separated from Berkeley County, which it did in 1801. The four corner lots are occupied by the courthouse, city hall, post office (formerly the jail), and Charles Washington Hall, an event space and food hall.

In 1794, James Madison married Dolley Todd Payne at Harewood, the home of George Steptoe Washington, son of George Washington's brother Colonel Samuel Washington, just outside Charles Town.

=== 19th century ===
Jefferson County was formed in 1801 as Charles Washington had anticipated. The county courthouse stands on one of the lots he donated, as did the jail until 1919, when it was demolished and replaced by the Post Office. Charles Washington died sometime between July and September, 1799, only a short while before the death of his brother George. Charles' and his wife Mildred's grave sites near Evitts Run have recently been located and surrounded by a stone wall.

In 1844, the first issue of the Spirit of Jefferson newspaper was published in Charles Town by James W. Beller. It is the oldest newspaper in the state still (2020) being published.

On October 16, 1859, abolitionist John Brown and his followers raided the Federal arsenal at nearby Harpers Ferry, 7 miles (11 km) east of Charles Town. The insurrection was quickly put down and John Brown and his six captured associates were tried in the Jefferson County Courthouse for treason, murder, and fomenting a slave insurrection; all were found guilty and were hanged at the location occupied today by the Gibson-Todd House. Brown's trial and execution brought the national press and many other visitors to Charles Town. During the six weeks between Brown's arrest (October 19) and his execution (December 2) Charles Town was an armed military camp; hundreds of soldiers were stationed there to prevent a rescue of Brown, and a cannon was placed in front of the courthouse. See Virginia v. John Brown.

During the first two years of the Civil War, the front lines of the Union and Confederate armies in the area fluctuated and the town frequently changed hands during the military engagements in the surrounding areas, with the town first occupied by Confederate troops, then Union troops, then back to Confederate until 1863 when Union troops occupied the town for the remainder of the war.

In 1883, the Valley Telephone Company was incorporated in West Virginia and began installing telephone lines throughout Jefferson County. The company's main office was in Charles Town. A writer in 1898 commented as follows:

Charles Town, which thirty-eight years ago had about fifteen hundred inhabitants, is now a thriving town of thirty-five hundred. The Court-House, in which John Brown and his followers (seven in number) were tried, has been remodeled, the jail in which they were incarcerated torn down and rebuilt; and on the site of the "execution" is erected a fine mansion, the residence of Colonel John Thomas Gibson, who was Colonel of the 55th Regiment Virginia Militia at that time (1859), and who was an active participant in the capture of John Brown and his followers.

=== 20th century to present ===
Charles Town City Hall, part of the Downtown Charles Town Historic District

In 1922, Bill Blizzard, a leader of striking coal miners during the Battle of Blair Mountain, was charged with treason and murder for engaging in warfare against state and federal troops in Mingo and Logan Counties. He was tried in the Jefferson County courthouse in Charles Town and was found not guilty.

The Charles Town Race Track first opened in 1933. It was built on land purchased from the Charles Town Horse Show Association. In 1999, the Charles Town Race Track underwent major renovation which included a large addition to house video slot machines. It was renamed Charles Town Races & Slots. It became the Hollywood Casino at Charles Town Races on July 2, 2010.

In 1975, the Jefferson Memorial Hospital in neighboring Ranson opened, replacing Charles Town General Hospital. It became part of the West Virginia University Health System and was renamed Jefferson Medical Center in 2013.

Charles Town's population has more than doubled since 2000, due in part to annexation of housing subdivisions that have been developed on land around the original city.

== Geography ==
Charles Town is located in the lower Shenandoah Valley. According to the United States Census Bureau, the city has a total area of 5.866 square miles (15.19 km^{2}), all land. Charles Town is located 63 miles (101 km) northwest of Washington, D.C. and 76 miles (122 km) west of Baltimore.

=== Climate ===
Due to its low elevation for West Virginia, Charles Town is on the northern extent of the Humid Subtropical climate zone, having cool to mildly cold winters and hot and humid summers. Precipitation is evenly distributed throughout the year, providing lush, abundant plant growth.

== Demographics ==
Historical population
Census	Pop.	Note	%±
1850	1,507		—
1860	1,376		−8.7%
1870	1,593		15.8%
1880	2,016		26.6%
1890	2,287		13.4%
1900	2,392		4.6%
1910	2,662		11.3%
1920	2,527		−5.1%
1930	2,434		−3.7%
1940	2,926		20.2%
1950	3,035		3.7%
1960	3,329		9.7%
1970	3,023		−9.2%
1980	2,857		−5.5%
1990	3,122		9.3%
2000	2,907		−6.9%
2010	5,259		80.9%
2020	6,534		24.2%
2024 (est.)	8,869		35.7%
U.S. Decennial Census; 2020 Census

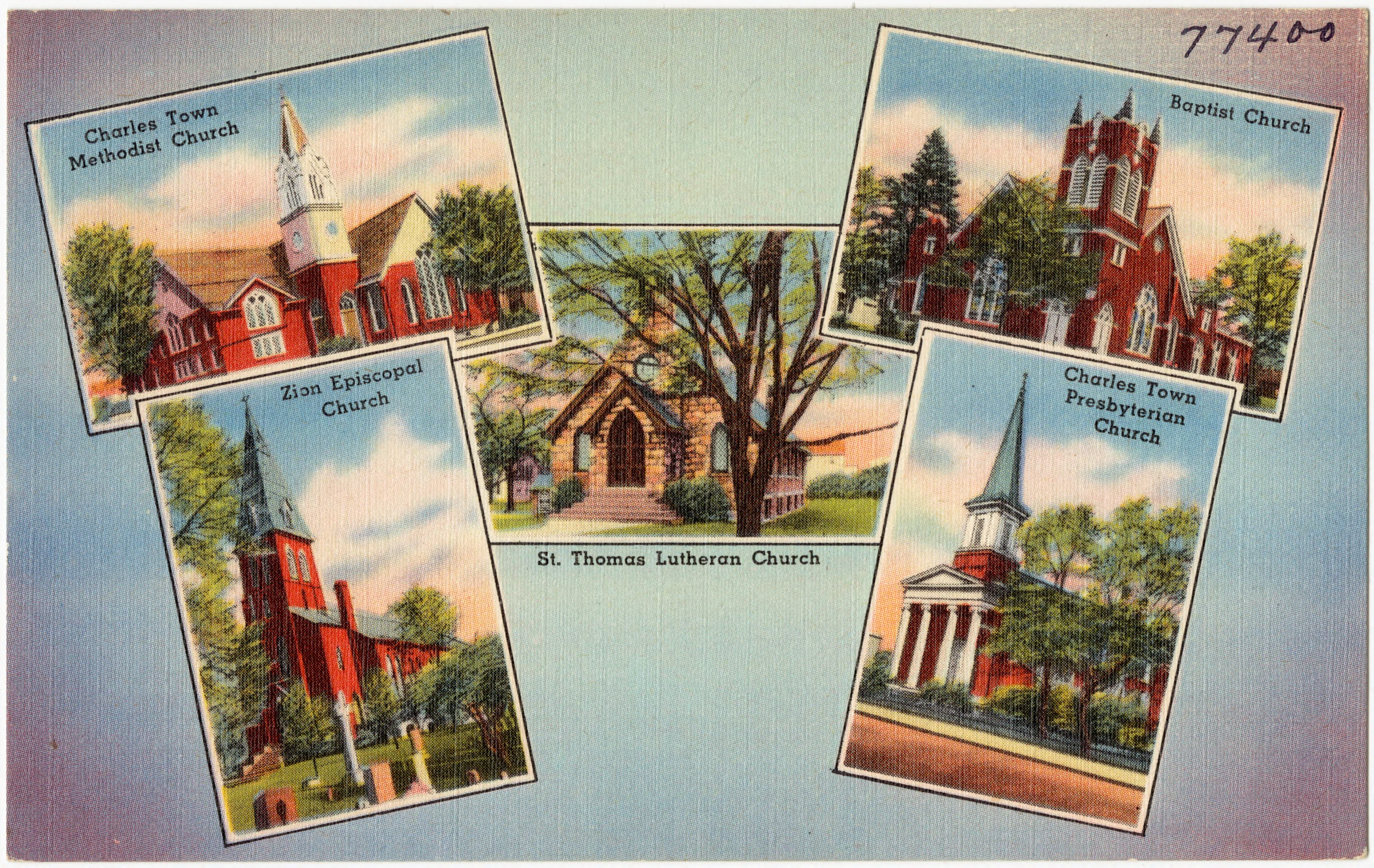
Five churches in Charles Town

=== Racial and ethnic composition ===
Charles Town, West Virginia – racial and ethnic composition Note: the US Census treats Hispanic/Latino as an ethnic category. This table excludes Latinos from the racial categories and assigns them to a separate category. Hispanics/Latinos may be of any race.
Race / ethnicity (NH = non-Hispanic)	Pop. 1990	Pop. 2000	Pop. 2010	Pop. 2020	% 1990	% 2000	% 2010	% 2020
White alone (NH)	2,455	2,242	3,802	4,385	78.64%	77.12%	72.30%	67.11%
Black or African American alone (NH)	15	506	672	750	0.48%	17.41%	12.78%	11.48%
Native American or Alaska Native alone (NH)	0	3	14	11	0.00%	0.10%	0.27%	0.17%
Asian alone (NH)	13	30	113	158	0.42%	1.03%	2.15%	2.42%
Pacific Islander alone (NH)	—	1	3	0	—	0.03%	0.06%	0.00%
Other race alone (NH)	2	5	24	18	0.06%	0.17%	0.46%	0.27%
Two or more races (NH)	—	—	88	435	—	—	1.67%	6.66%
Hispanic or Latino (any race)	55	74	473	777	1.76%	2.55%	8.99%	11.89%
Total	3,122	2,907	5,259	6,534	100.00%	100.00%	100.00%	100.00%

=== 2020 census ===
As of the 2020 census, there were 6,534 people, 2,462 households, and 1,587 families in the city. The median age was 38.9 years. 25.5% of residents were under the age of 18 and 14.5% were 65 years of age or older. For every 100 females there were 95.1 males, and for every 100 females age 18 and over there were 94.4 males age 18 and over.

97.0% of residents lived in urban areas, while 3.0% lived in rural areas.

Of the 2,462 households, 35.9% had children under the age of 18. Overall, 47.7% were married-couple households, 19.3% were households with a male householder and no spouse or partner present, and 25.5% were households with a female householder and no spouse or partner present. About 28.9% of all households were made up of individuals and 11.4% had someone living alone who was 65 years of age or older.

There were 2,625 housing units, of which 6.2% were vacant. The homeowner vacancy rate was 1.7% and the rental vacancy rate was 6.9%. The population density was 1,119.79 inhabitants per square mile (432.4/km^{2}), and housing unit density averaged 449.87 per square mile (173.7/km^{2}).

Racial composition as of the 2020 census
Race	Number	Percent
White	4,568	69.9%
Black or African American	764	11.7%
American Indian and Alaska Native	14	0.2%
Asian	165	2.5%
Native Hawaiian and Other Pacific Islander	0	0.0%
Some other race	286	4.4%
Two or more races	737	11.3%
Hispanic or Latino (of any race)	777	11.9%

=== 2010 census ===
As of the 2010 census, there were 5,259 people, 2,011 households, and 1,289 families living in the city. The population density was 905.2 inhabitants per square mile (349.5/km^{2}). There were 2,270 housing units at an average density of 390.7 per square mile (150.9/km^{2}). The racial makeup of the city was 76.88% White, 13.27% African American, 0.29% Native American, 2.15% Asian, 0.06% Pacific Islander, 3.75% from some other races and 3.61% from two or more races. Hispanic or Latino people of any race were 8.99% of the population.

There were 2,011 households, of which 37.2% had children under the age of 18 living with them, 47.3% were married couples living together, 11.1% had a female householder with no husband present, 5.7% had a male householder with no wife present, and 35.9% were non-families. 28.7% of all households were made up of individuals, and 10.1% had someone living alone who was 65 years of age or older. The average household size was 2.57 and the average family size was 3.19.

The median age in the city was 35.5 years. 26.9% of residents were under the age of 18; 6.9% were between the ages of 18 and 24; 31.4% were from 25 to 44; 22.5% were from 45 to 64; and 12.4% were 65 years of age or older. The gender makeup of the city was 48.9% male and 51.1% female.

=== 2000 census ===
As of the 2000 census, there were 2,907 people, 1,285 households, and 732 families living in the city. The population density was 2,082.3 inhabitants per square mile (804.0/km^{2}). There were 1,396 housing units at an average density of 999.9 per square mile (386.1/km^{2}). The racial makeup of the city was 78.91% White, 17.54% African American, 0.10% Native American, 1.03% Asian, 0.03% Pacific Islander, 0.62% from some other races and 1.75% from two or more races. Hispanic or Latino people of any race were 2.55% of the population.

There were 1,285 households, out of which 25.8% had children under the age of 18 living with them, 39.5% were married couples living together, 13.5% had a female householder with no husband present, and 43.0% were non-families. 36.0% of all households were made up of individuals, and 19.4% had someone living alone who was 65 years of age or older. The average household size was 2.26 and the average family size was 2.95.

In the city, the population was spread out, with 22.9% under the age of 18, 8.6% from 18 to 24, 27.4% from 25 to 44, 22.5% from 45 to 64, and 18.5% who were 65 years of age or older. The median age was 39 years. For every 100 females, there were 89.0 males. For every 100 females age 18 and over, there were 85.2 males.

The median income for a household in the city was $32,538, and the median income for a family was $43,547. Males had a median income of $30,917 versus $22,241 for females. The per capita income for the city was $18,104. About 13.2% of families and 15.8% of the population were below the poverty line, including 20.3% of those under age 18 and 13.4% of those age 65 or over.

=== Housing, income, and other estimates ===
According to realtor website Zillow, the average price of a home as of May 31, 2025, in Charles Town is $402,198.

As of the 2023 American Community Survey, there are 2,531 estimated households in Charles Town with an average of 2.67 persons per household. The city has a median household income of $94,830. Approximately 7.4% of the city's population lives at or below the poverty line. Charles Town has an estimated 69.4% employment rate, with 38.1% of the population holding a bachelor's degree or higher and 94.0% holding a high school diploma.

The top five reported ancestries (people were allowed to report up to two ancestries, thus the figures will generally add to more than 100%) were English (89.5%), Spanish (7.3%), Indo-European (2.1%), Asian and Pacific Islander (1.1%), and Other (0.0%).

According to QuickFacts, the median age in the city was 38.5 years.

== Education ==
- Jefferson High School
- Washington High School
- Charles Town Middle School
- Harpers Ferry Middle School
- Shepherdstown Middle School
- Wildwood Middle School
- Blue Ridge Elementary School
- Blue Ridge Primary School
- C.W. Shipley Elementary School
- Driswood Elementary School
- North Jefferson Elementary School
- Page-Jackson Elementary School
- Ranson Elementary School
- Shepherdstown Elementary School
- T.A. Lowery Elementary School
- Wright Denny Elementary School
- American Public University/American Military University
- Catholic International University

== Transportation ==
=== Highways ===
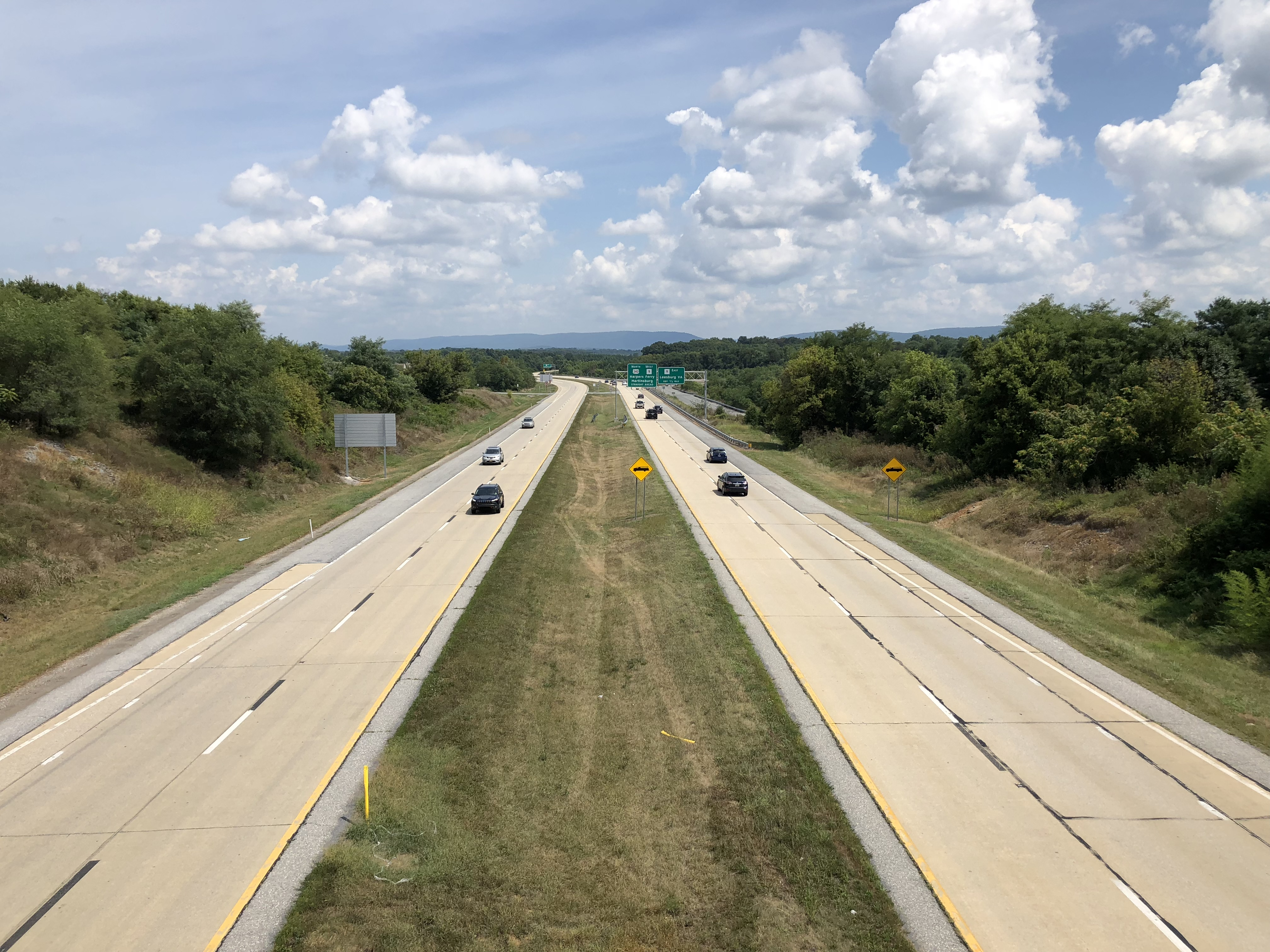
US Route 340 approaching West Virginia Route 9 in Charles Town

Charles Town is served primarily by two main highways, U.S. Route 340 and West Virginia Route 9, which run concurrently for a short stretch in the vicinity of Charles Town. US 340 travels in a general southwest to northeast direction, connecting Charles Town to locations in the eastern Shenandoah Valley of Virginia to the southwest. To the northeast, US 340 provides direct access to Harpers Ferry and Frederick. WV 9 traverses the region with a northwest-to-southeast orientation, connecting Charles Town to Martinsburg and Leesburg. Additional highways serving Charles Town include West Virginia Route 51 and West Virginia Route 115.

In January 2024, U.S. 340 broke ground on a widening project which expands the highway from two lanes to four lanes. As of April 3, 2026, the northbound lane is completed.

=== Public transportation ===
Charles Town and surrounding Jefferson County is served by the Eastern Panhandle Transit Authority.

== See also ==
- Charles Town Cave
- Charles Town Cannons
- Journey Through Hallowed Ground National Heritage Area
- Virginia v. John Brown
