= Dandridge =

Dandridge is a surname. Notable people with the surname include:

- Bartholomew Dandridge (1737–1785), American lawyer, jurist, and planter
- Bartholomew Dandridge (1691–c.1754), English portrait painter
- Bob Dandridge (born 1947), American basketball player
- Craig Dandridge (born 2007), American football player
- Danske Dandridge (1854–1914), American poet, historian and garden writer
- Dorothy Jean Dandridge (1922–1965), American film and theatre actress, singer and dancer
- Ed Dandridge, corporate executive
- Edmund P. Dandridge (1881–1961), American Episcopal bishop
- Edmund P. Dandridge (politician) (died 1884), American politician from Virginia
- John Dandridge (1700–1756), Virginian colonel, planter, and clerk
- Joseph Dandridge (1665–1747), English silk-pattern designer
- Martha Dandridge (1731–1802), (later Martha Washington) first First Lady of the United States
- Merle Dandridge (born 1975), American actress
- Nicola Dandridge, English Lawyer
- Putney Dandridge (1902–1946), American bandleader, jazz pianist and vocalist
- Ray Dandridge (1913–1994), American baseball player
- Raymond Garfield Dandridge (1882/83-1930), American poet
- Ruby Dandridge (1900–1987), American actress
- Violet Dandridge (1878–1956), American scientific illustrator, painter, naturalist, and suffragist
- Vivian Dandridge (1921–1991), American singer, actress and dancer

== See also ==
- Dandridge (comics), a fictional character in the British comic anthology 2000 AD
- Battle of Dandridge
- Dandridge Sisters
- Dandridge, Tennessee
- Dandridge v. Williams
