= Bower =

Bower may refer to:

== Arts and entertainment ==
- Catherine, or The Bower, an unfinished Jane Austen novel
- A high-ranking card (usually a Jack) in certain card games:
  - The Right and Left Bower (or Bauer), the two highest-ranking cards in the game of Euchre
  - The Best and Under Bower in the game of Bester Bauer
  - The Right and Left Bower in the game of Réunion
- Bower Studios, a design studio based in NYC.

== Places ==
- Bower, South Australia, a town
- Bower, Highland, Scotland, a village and civil parish
- Bower, Nebraska, a ghost town in the United States
- Bower, West Virginia, a ghost town in the United States
- Havering-atte-Bower, a village within the London Borough of Havering
- Mount Bower, Victoria Land, Antarctica

== People ==
- Bower (surname)
- Bower Featherstone, Canadian civil servant convicted of espionage in 1966
- E. Bower Carty (1916–2001), Canadian public servant and Chairman of the World Scout Committee
- Roger Squires (1932–2023), British retired crossword compiler/setter, one of whose pseudonyms was Bower

== Other uses ==
- 1639 Bower, an asteroid
- Bower (architecture), a dwelling or lean-to shelter, also known as a variation of pergola
- Bower Award
- Bower railway station, Highland, Scotland
- The Bower, a building in Jefferson County, West Virginia, on the National Register of Historic Places
- A sculpture built by a bowerbird to attract a mate
- An anchor carried at the bow of a ship
- A woman's bedroom or private apartments, especially in a medieval castle – cf. boudoir

== See also ==
- Pandorea jasminoides, a vine species also known as the bower of beauty, bower vine or bower plant
- Bower House, a grade I listed Palladian mansion in Havering-atte-Bower, England
- Bower Fold, Stalybridge, Greater Manchester, England, the home ground of Stalybridge Celtic football club
- Bower Place, a shopping centre in Red Deer, Alberta, Canada
- Bower Manuscript, a Sanskrit manuscript
- Bauer (disambiguation)
- Bowers (disambiguation)
- Bowery (disambiguation)
