= Bower (surname) =

Bower is a Scottish and English surname or multiple possible origins. It can be an occupational surname, meaning "bow maker", an equivalent of Bowyer or a house servant, an equivlent of Bowerman. It can be a toponymic surname, after any of locations named Bower or Bowers. It may also be a topographic surname for a person who lived in a small cottage (Middle English bur, bour for 'bower'). Notable people with the surname include:

- Adrian Bower (born 1970), English actor
- Archibald Bower (1686–1766), Scottish historian
- B. M. Bower (1871–1940), American novelist
- Billy Bower (1887–1954), English footballer
- Caroline Bower, Australian medical researcher and professor of medicine
- David Bower (born 1969), Welsh actor
- David Bower (politician) (1819–1898), of Port Adelaide, South Australia
- Edward Bower (1635–1667), English portrait painter
- Emma Eliza Bower (1852–1937), American physician, club-woman, and newspaper owner, publisher, editor
- Frederick Orpen Bower (1855–1948), English botanist
- Graham John Bower (1848–1933), Irish diplomat
- Gordon H. Bower (1932–2020), American cognitive psychologist
- Hetty Bower (1905–2013), English activist
- Iris Bower (1915–2005), Royal Air Force nurse
- James Campbell Bower (born 1988), English actor, singer, and model
- Jeff Bower (American football) (born 1953), American football coach
- Jeff Bower (basketball) (born 1961), American basketball executive
- Johnny Bower (1924–2017), Canadian hockey goaltender
- John Nott-Bower (1892–1972), British policeman
- Lester Bower (1947–2015), American mass murderer
- Louisa Nott-Bower (née Yorke, 1861–1925), Welsh archer
- Mark Bower (born 1980), English footballer
- Marvin Bower (1903–2003), American lawyer
- Matthew Bower (born 1962), British musician
- Michael Bower (born 1975), American actor
- Norman Adolph Henry Bower (1907–1990), British politician
- Paul Bower (born 1988), Australian rules footballer
- Robert Bower (disambiguation), multiple people
- Scott Bower (born 1978), American soccer player
- Shane Bower (wrestler) (1965–2007), Canadian wrestler
- Steve Bower, English radio presenter
- Thomas Bower (1838–1919), English architect
- Tom Bower (born 1946), British writer
- Tom Bower (actor) (1938–2024), American actor
- Walter Bower (c.1385–1449), Scottish chronicler

== See also ==
- Bauer (surname)
- Bowers (surname)
- Bowyer (surname)
