= Bowers House =

Bowers House may refer to:

in the United States

(by state then city)

- Bowers House, an intentional community in the form of a student co-op in Hyde Park, Chicago, Illinois
- John S. Bowers House, Decatur, Indiana
- Bowers House (Wichita, Kansas), listed on the NRHP in Sedwick County
- Jerathmell Bowers House, Lowell, Massachusetts
- Jonathan Bowers House, Lowell, Massachusetts
- Joseph Bowers House, Amasa, Michigan
- Bowers Mansion, Reno, Nevada
- Bowers–Livingston–Osborn House, Parsippany, New Jersey
- Dr. Wesley Bowers House, Southampton, New York
- Bowers-Tripp House, Washington, North Carolina
- Hoffman-Bowers-Josey-Riddick House, Scotland Neck, North Carolina
- Dovel-Bowers House, Pickerington, Ohio, listed on the NRHP in Fairfield County
- George W. and Hetty A. Bowers House, Portland, Oregon, listed on the National Register of Historic Places
- Bowers-Kirkpatrick Farmstead, Gray, Tennessee, listed on the NRHP in Washington County
- Bowers-Felts House, Lufkin, Texas
- Bowers House (Sugar Grove, West Virginia)
