= Bowerman =

Bowerman is an English surname. Notable people with the surname include:

- Alfred Bowerman (1873–1959), English cricket player
- Andy Bowerman (born 1967), British Anglican priest
- Bill Bowerman (1911–1999), American track and field coach and co-founder of Nike
- C. W. Bowerman (1851–1947), British trade unionist and politician
- Cristina Bowerman, Italian chef
- Edward LeRoy Bowerman (1892–1977), Canadian politician
- Elsie Bowerman (1889–1973), British lawyer, suffragette and Titanic survivor
- Frank Bowerman (1868–1948), American baseball player
- Fred William Bowerman (1893–1953), American bank robber
- Jay Bowerman (1876–1957), American politician
- Karen Bowerman, British journalist
- Lisa Bowerman (born 1962), British actress
- Mary Bowerman (1908–2005), American botanist
- Melissa Bowerman (1942–2011), linguist
- Ralph Lee Bowerman (1934–2015), American musician
- William Bowerman (died 1590), English politician

== See also ==
- Bowerman's Nose
- Bower
