= Bowery (disambiguation) =

Bowery most prominently refers to a street and neighborhood in Lower Manhattan, New York City. It is an anglicization of Bouwerie, the archaic form of the Dutch for "farm", that was used in numerous New Netherland placenames.

Bowery may also refer to:

== Locations ==
- Bowery Bay, a bay in New York City
- Bowery station, a New York City Subway station on the J and Z services of the New York City Subway
- Bowery Creek
- Oak Bowery, Alabama

== People ==
- Jordan Bowery (born 1991), footballer who plays for Championship club Rotherham United
- Leigh Bowery (1961–1994), performance artist, club creature, and clothing designer
- Norman Bowery (1944–2016), British pharmacologist
- Bert Bowery (born 1954), British footballer
- William Bowery, a pseudonym for the English actor and producer Joe Alwyn

== Arts and entertainment ==
=== Film ===
- The Bowery Boys, fictional New York City characters who were featured in a number of films
- The Bowery (film), a 1933 historical film about the Lower East Side of Manhattan at the turn of the century
- On the Bowery, a 1956 documentary film directed by Lionel Rogosin
- Bowery Bugs, a 1949 cartoon featuring Bugs Bunny
- Bowery Daze, a 1934 animated film featuring Krazy Kat
- Rose of the Bowery, a 1927 silent film directed by Bertram Bracken
- Bowery at Midnight, a 1942 horror movie starring Bela Lugosi and John Archer
- Bowery to Broadway, a 1944 film starring Maria Montez, Jack Oakie, and Susanna Foster
- Bowery Boy, a 1940 comedy film directed by William Morgan

=== Music ===
- Bowery Electric, an American post-rock band

==== Songs ====
- "Bowery" (song), by Zach Bryan featuring Kings of Leon
- "The Bowery" (song), from the musical A Trip to Chinatown with music by Percy Gaunt and lyrics by Charles H. Hoyt
- "The Bowery Electric", a song by Jed Davis

==== Albums ====
- Bowery Songs, an album recorded by Joan Baez at the Bowery Ballroom
- Live from the Bowery Ballroom, a live album by Kathleen Edwards

==== Other ====
- The Bowery Boys: New York City History, a podcast focused on the history of people, places, and events of New York City

== Groups and organizations ==
- Bowery Boys (gang), an anti-immigrant and anti-Catholic gang based north of the Five Points district in Manhattan, New York City
- The Bowery Boys, fictional New York City characters, portrayed by a company of New York actors
- Bowery Mission, a rescue mission on Bowery in Manhattan, New York City
- Bowery Savings Bank, a New York City bank chartered in 1834
- The Bowery Presents, a New York City based entertainment company
- Bowery Farming, a New York based farming company

== Buildings ==
- Bowery Amphitheatre, a building on Bowery in New York City
- Bowery Ballroom, a music venue on Delancey Street in New York City
- The Bowery House, a historic hotel on Bowery in New York City
- The Bowery Hotel, a hotel on Bowery in New York City
- Bowery Theatre, a playhouse formerly located on Lafayette Street in New York City
- Bowery Poetry Club, a poetry club located on Bowery in New York City
- Bowery Savings Bank Building (130 Bowery), a former bank building on Bowery in New York City
- 110 East 42nd Street, a bank building on Bowery in New York City adjacent to the building at 130 Bowery
- 97 Bowery, an iconic building located on Bowery in New York City
- Miner's Bowery Theatre, a historic theatre in the Bowery in New York City which was destroyed in 1929
- Bowery Street Grocery Store, a historic grocery store building in Iowa City, Iowa
- The Bowery at This Is The Place Heritage Park. In Utah, bowery is a synonym for pavilion (see, e.g. Clinton City Park Bowery Reservations), perhaps as a variant of 'bower' in the sense of a pergola.

== Other uses ==
- The Houston Bowery Wall, a famous mural wall located on Bowery in New York City
- Operation Bowery, an Anglo-American naval operation of World War II
