= Violet Dandridge =

American illustrator

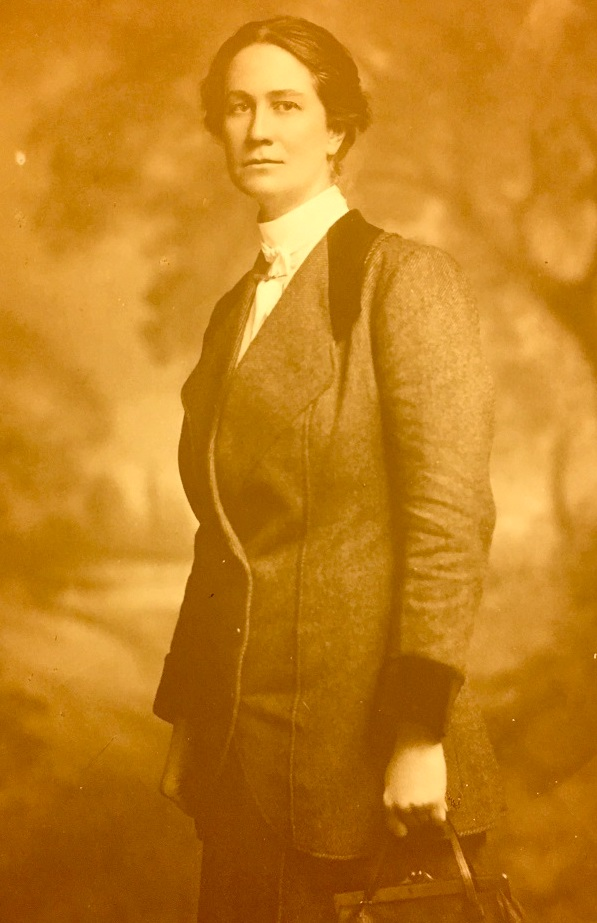
- Born: Serena Katherine Dandridge; March 15, 1878; Shepherdstown, West Virginia, U.S.
- Died: November 7, 1956 (aged 78); Towson, Baltimore County, Maryland, U.S.
- Other names: Serena–Katherine Dandridge
- Occupations: Scientific illustrator, naturalist, suffragist
- Mother: Caroline Dane "Danske" Bedinger Dandridge

Violet Dandridge was the pseudonym for Serena Katherine Dandridge (1878–1956), an American scientific illustrator, painter, naturalist, and suffragist. She was the Smithsonian Institution’s first female scientific illustrator.

== Early life ==
Serena Katherine Dandridge was born March 15, 1878, in her family home of Rose Brake in Shepherdstown, West Virginia, and was raised there. Some sources state she was born at The Bower, the Dandridge family home on the Opequon River near Bower, West Virginia. Her parents were Adam Stephen Dandridge and poet Caroline Dane "Danske" Bedinger Dandridge; she was the eldest of three siblings which included Stephen Hawks and Dorothea Spotswood. Her father had served as a soldier under Stonewall Jackson. She was a descendant of Martha Washington (née Martha Dandridge).

In 1896, at the age of 18, she moved to Washington, D.C., to study fine art. The following year she moved back to Shepherdstown after her younger brother unexpectedly died while he was attending university. Her younger sister died in 1907.

== Career and mid-life ==
Dandridge moved back to Washington, D.C., in 1903 and worked as a scientific illustrator for the National Museum of Natural History in the Smithsonian Institution. She had worked under zoologists Mary Jane Rathbun and Austin Hobart Clark, in order to create images for their publications. In August 1911, Dandridge and Rathbun were conducting research on marine biology and travelled to South Harpswell, Maine, and Woods Hole, Massachusetts. On this trip they were documenting the east coast invertebrates for an exhibition, and Dandridge made color sketches of littoral invertebrates, so Rathbun could later transfer the observed colors to the preserved specimens.

In 1914, she was committed by her parents to Sheppard and Enoch Pratt Hospital, a psychiatric hospital for “nervousness”. She spent the rest of her life having periods of hospitalization. During one of her hospital stays in June 1914, her mother Danske Dandridge had committed suicide; however, this was concealed by the family in concerns for Dandridge's health.

Dandridge attended the 1915 Annual Convention of the National American Woman Suffrage Association; she had subscribed to The Suffragist, a weekly newspaper; she donated to the West Virginia Equal Suffrage Association; and she had arranged for a speaker from the National American Woman Suffrage Association to visit Shepherdstown. In 1916, she led a suffragist parade in her hometown.

In 1930, Dandridge protested the cutting of cedar trees in Shepherdstown by acts of physical resistance; she clung to one of the trees blocking their removal.

Dandridge was a winter member of the Art League of Manatee in Bradenton, Florida. In 1939, she exhibited her painting, "Le Chene Seigneurial", of an oak tree at the Salon des Artistes Français in Paris. The Paris magazine Les Artistes d'Aujourd' Hui published an article in 1939 featuring Dandridge.

== Late life, death and legacy ==
She eventually moved back to her family home of Rose Brake and lived with her cousin Nina Mitchell; neither woman had married, and they operated a dairy farm and raised sheep and cows. Dandridge died on November 7, 1956, after one of her many trips returning to Sheppard and Enoch Pratt Hospital for treatment. She is buried in Elmwood Cemetery in Shepherdstown.

Duke University Libraries and Shepherd University have her archive and papers. In 2016, Shepherd University's Scarborough Library had an exhibition of her sketches and drawings.
