= Bauer =

Bauer is a German surname meaning "peasant" or "farmer". For notable people sharing the surname Bauer, see Bauer (surname).

Bauer may also refer to:

== Education and literature ==
- Bauer's Lexicon, a dictionary of Biblical Greek
- Bauer College of Business, the business school of the University of Houston
- Bauer Elementary, a school in Miamisburg, Ohio
- Bauer Hall, a residence hall at Cornell University

== Entertainment ==
- Bauer (band), a Dutch band
- Bauer Media Group, a German publishing company
  - Bauer Radio, its UK-based radio division
- Bauer (play), a 2014 play by Lauren Gunderson about the artist Rudolf Bauer

== Industry ==
- Bauer AG, a German construction and machinery manufacturing concern
- Bauer Pottery, an American pottery
- Bauer Type Foundry, a German type foundry
- Bauer Kompressoren, Germany, high pressure Gas compressor systems
- Bauer Automatic, an American semi-automatic pistol

== Military ==
- USS Bauer (DE-1025), a Dealey-class destroyer escort in the United States Navy
- German submarine Wilhelm Bauer, a type XX1 U-boat

== People ==
- Bauer (surname)

== Games and sport ==
- Bauer (playing card) or Bower, another name for the Jack in certain card games
- Bauer Hockey, a manufacturer of bandy, field hockey and ice hockey equipment
- Estádio Augusto Bauer, a football stadium in Brusque, Brazil

== See also ==
- Bauer & Cie. v. O'Donnell, a 1913 U.S. Supreme Court case
- Boer (surname), Dutch equivalent of the surname
- Baauer (born 1989), music producer known for his song "Harlem Shake"
- Bower (disambiguation)
- Bowers (disambiguation)
