= Robert Powers =

Robert Powers may refer to:

- Robert B. Powers (1900–1976), American police officer
- Robert T. Powers, American mathematician
- John Robert Powers (1892–1977), American actor and talent agent

== See also ==
- Robert Power (disambiguation)
- Robert Bowers (disambiguation)
