= Robert Power =

Robert Power may refer to:

- Robert Power (cricketer) (1833–1914), Australian cricketer
- Robert Power (Australian cyclist) (born 1995), Australian cyclist
- Robert Power (Irish cyclist) (born 1971), Irish cyclist
- Robert Power (surveyor) (1794–1869), Surveyor General of Tasmania
- Robbie Power, Irish jockey

== See also ==
- Robert Powers (disambiguation)
- Bob Power, record producer and audio engineer
- Robert Bower (disambiguation)
