= Wannalancit Street Historic District =

Historic district in Massachusetts, United States

- U.S. National Register of Historic Places
- U.S. Historic district
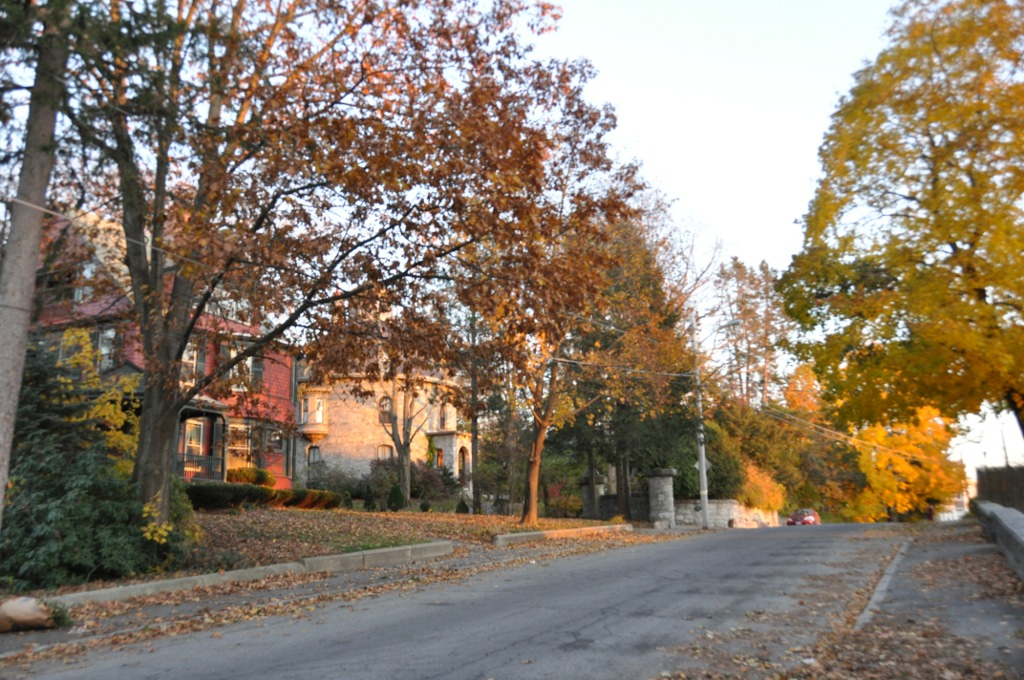
- Street scene near the top of the hill; the Jonathan Bowers House is visible to the rear left.

- Location within Massachusetts Location within the United States
- Location: Lowell, Massachusetts
- Coordinates: 42°38′48″N 71°19′46″W
- Architect: Stickney, Frederick W.
- Architectural style: Late Victorian, Colonial Revival, Greek Revival
- NRHP reference No.: 98000541
- Added to NRHP: May 20, 1998

The Wannalancit Street Historic District is a historic district at 14-71 Wannalancit St., and 390, 406 Pawtucket Street in Lowell, Massachusetts. This section of Wannalancit Street includes a remarkably well preserved and distinctive 19th century houses, representing a cross section of popular architectural styles of the period. The most unusual house in the district is the round Jonathan Bowers House (built 1872); the oldest building is a c. 1853 vernacular Greek Revival cottage at 22 Wannalancit Street.

The district was listed on the National Register of Historic Places in 1998.

== See also ==
- National Register of Historic Places listings in Lowell, Massachusetts
