= The Bower =

Historic house in West Virginia, United States

- U.S. National Register of Historic Places
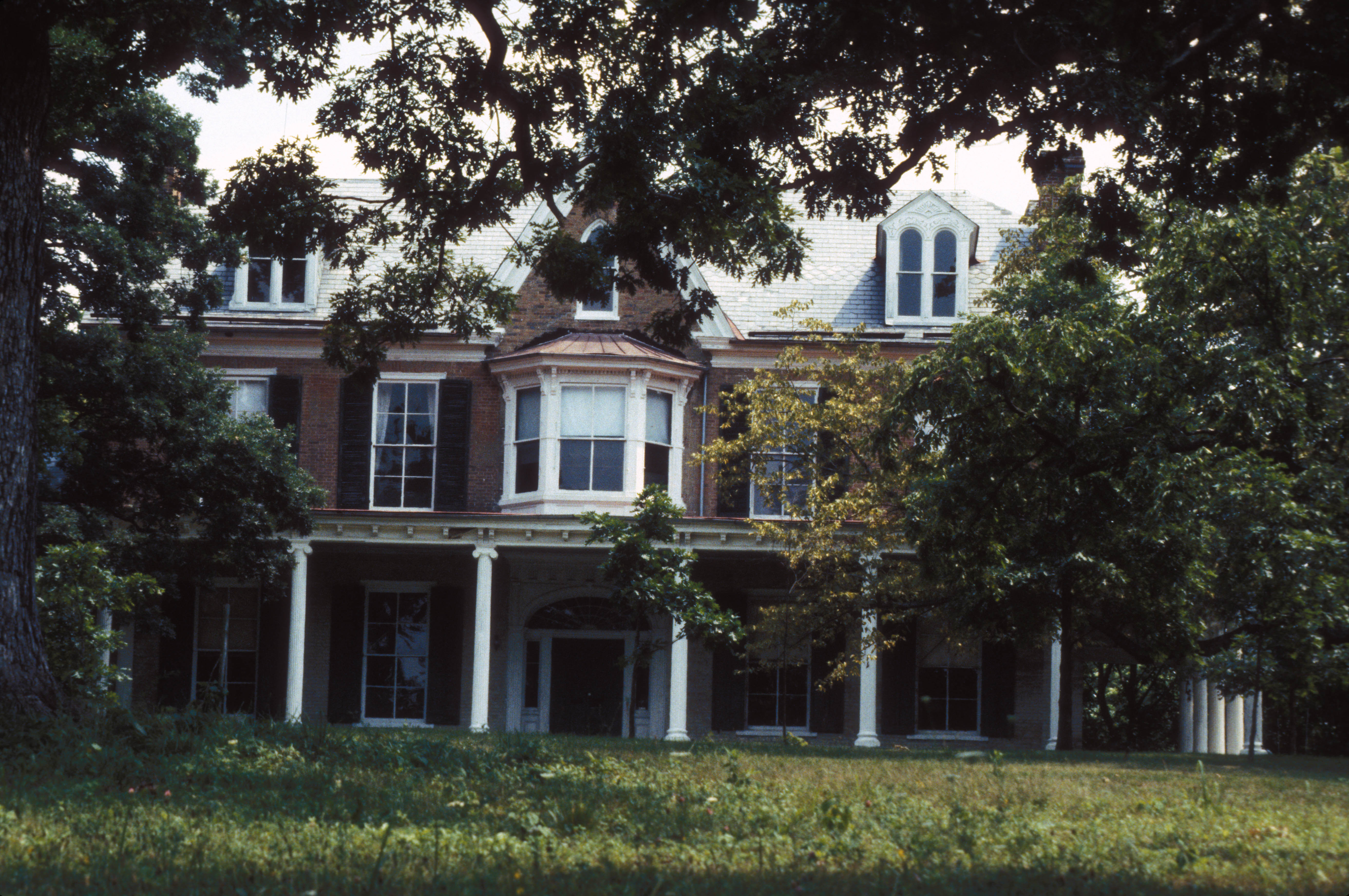

- Location within West Virginia Location within the United States
- Nearest city: Leetown, West Virginia
- Coordinates: 39°21′54″N 77°57′27″W
- Built: 1806
- Architectural style: Gothic Revival, Federal
- NRHP reference No.: 82004321
- Added to NRHP: April 15, 1982

The Bower is an 1806 residence, originally built in the Federal style in Jefferson County, West Virginia, United States. It was later remodeled with Gothic Revival features after a fire in 1892. The name appeared as early as 1753 when Major General Adam Stephen had a hunting lodge at this location.

== History ==
A land grant from Lord Fairfax, General Stephen lived at "Bower Lodge" from 1753 to 1772, when he moved to his residence in Martinsburg, Virginia, a town he founded. The Bower was given to his daughter Ann Stephen and her husband Alexander Spottswood Dandridge, whose first cousin was Martha Dandridge Custis Washington. The property passed to Stephen's only grandchild, Adam Stephen Dandridge I, in 1791. Dandridge built the main house in 1806. In 1833, The Bower passed to Adam Stephen Dandridge II.

Novelist John Pendleton Kennedy visited The Bower in 1832, and based his novel Swallow Barn on his views of the estate.

During the American Civil War, J. E. B. Stuart set up a headquarters at The Bower at Adam Stephen Dandridge II's invitation. His staff included Generals Wade Hampton and Fitzhugh Lee, as well as staff officer Heros von Borcke from September 28, 1862, to October 10, 1862. A horse bred at The Bower was given as a gift to General Robert E. Lee to use when his primary mount, "Traveller", needed a rest. That horse was the well known "Lucy Long".

Danske Bedinger Dandridge, the wife of Adam Stephen Dandridge III, lived at The Bower for a time before moving to Rose Brake. Her poetry appeared in The Century and Harpers. Some sources state their daughter, artist Violet Dandridge was born at The Bower.

In the early 20th century, the house became a summer home for Bishop Edmund Pendleton Dandridge, Episcopal Bishop of Tennessee. The property remains in the same family today.

== Description ==
The Bower was built in brick with a center hall plan. An unusually large house for its time and place, it featured 12-foot (3.7 m) ceilings. A fire in the late 19th century destroyed the interior, and the house was rebuilt with Gothic Revival features and expanded.
