= Robert Bowers =

Robert Bowers may refer to:

- Robert Bruce Bowers (1897–1956), Irish cricket player
- Robert Hood Bowers (1877–1941), American musician
- Barney Bowers (born 1959, as Robert Bowers), British football player
- Robert Gregory Bowers (born 1972), American mass murderer; perpetrator of the Pittsburgh synagogue shooting in 2018

== See also ==
- Robert Bower (disambiguation)
- Bowers (disambiguation)
