= Bowers =

Bowers may refer to:

== Persons ==
- Bowers (surname)

== Places ==
Antarctica

- Bowers Mountains
- Bowers Piedmont Glacier

United Kingdom

- Bowers, Staffordshire, England
- Bowers Gifford, Essex, England

United States

- Bowers, Delaware
- Bowers, Indiana
- Bowers, Pennsylvania
- Bowers, Wisconsin
- Bowers House (disambiguation), several structures
- Bowers Museum, Santa Ana, California
- Bowers Stadium, Sam Houston University, Texas

== Other uses ==
- Brock Bowers, tight end for the Las Vegas Raiders
- Bowers & Wilkins, a loudspeaker company in the United Kingdom
- USS Bowers (DE-637)
- Bowers v. Hardwick, a 1986 U.S. Supreme Court decision
- Bowers v. Kerbaugh-Empire Co., a 1926 U.S. Supreme Court decision
- Bowers Coaches, a bus company based in the High Peak area of Derbyshire in England
- Bowers' operators, a way to write large numbers
- Betty Bowers, a fictional character

== See also ==
- Bauer (disambiguation)
- Bower (disambiguation)
