= New Pioneer Food Co-op =

Coordinates: 41°39′37.15″N 91°31′42.82″W

- Type: Consumers' cooperative
- Founded: 1971
- Headquarters: Iowa City, Iowa, United States
- Products: Grocery
- Website: newpi.coop

New Pioneer Food Co-op, commonly shortened to New Pi, is a locally owned food cooperative based in Iowa City, Iowa. New Pioneer has stores in Iowa City, Coralville, and Cedar Rapids as well as a production hub in North Liberty, Iowa.

New Pioneer was founded in 1971 as a natural foods buying club modeled after the Rochdale Principles, and is now a full-service bakery, deli, and grocery store. It specializes in local food, organic produce, cage-free antibiotic and hormone-free meat, milk, and poultry. The co-op's seafood program is certified sustainable by the Seafood Watch program from the Monterey Bay Aquarium. The handmade pastry selection uses local cage-free eggs, local butter, and organic flour, and also offers a selection of wheat-free dessert options. All foods sold are restricted to natural additives. The co-op offers eco-friendly home and healthcare products.

New Pioneer takes its name from the organization that created the cooperative model, the Rochdale Pioneers.

== History ==
New Pioneer Food Co-op began as a bulk food buying club in 1969 in an Iowa City community center. In 1971, New Pioneer filed legal papers and opened a storefront at 518 Bowery Street in Iowa City, a building known as the Bowery Street Grocery Store after several groceries stores that have occupied the space.

The co-op moved to the second floor of Vine Building, at Prentiss and Gilbert Streets, in 1973. In 1977, the co-op moved again into a portion of a building at 22 S. Van Buren Street. The co-op expanded to occupy the full building in 1987. In 1988 New Pioneer opened a store in Cedar Rapids, Iowa. It was unsuccessful and closed in 1991.

New Pioneer Food Co-op opened the hearth bread bakery Bakehouse in 1994 at First Avenue and Fifth Street in Coralville. In 2001, the Coralville store opened and soon faced financial struggles. By 2004, the Coralville store nearly matched the Iowa City location in sales and by the 2005, the co-op was free of debt.

The Iowa City store was remodeled and had its equipment upgraded in 2007.

New Pioneer Food Co-op opened its Cedar Rapids store in 2014.

== Organizational structure ==
New Pioneer Food Co-op's three grocery locations, bakehouse and administrative offices are managed by hired staff, and all are overseen by a member-elected Board of Directors.

== Membership ==
The current member–owner plan, calling for a one-time $60 investment for membership, was created in July 1982. There is no yearly fee associated with membership. Members receive extra discounts on special days. The stores are open to all shoppers, one does not need to be a member to buy.

In profitable years, New Pioneer’s Board of Directors has the discretion to authorize investment in improvements, distribution of dividends to members proportionate to their purchases, payment of staff bonuses, or donations to non-profit organizations in its community.

== Publications ==
New Pioneer is the publisher of Catalyst, a quarterly food magazine that spotlights Iowa farmers and chefs.

== See also ==
- Co-operative economics
- List of food cooperatives
