= Bower Studios =

Design studio based in Brooklyn, New York

Bower studios
- Logo of Bower Studios
- Company type: Design studio
- Founder: Danny Giannella; Tammer Hijazi
- Headquarters: 810 Humboldt St., 2A, Brooklyn, NY, USA
- Key people: Danny Giannella (creative director); Tammer Hijazi (design director); Jeffrey Renz (development and sales director)
- Website: bower-studios.com

Bower Studios (or simply Bower) is a furniture and design studio based in Brooklyn. They specialise in making mirrors, but they also offer furniture, lighting, and accessories. They also collaborate with other artists on special projects.

The studio's partners are Danny Giannella, co-founder and creative director, Tammer Hijazi, co-founder and design director, and Jeffrey Renz, development and sales director.

== Collaborations ==
In 2020, they partnered with Stærk&Christensen (designer Camilla Stærk and model/photographer Helena Christensen) on a mirror for their BOWERx collaboration series.

== See also ==
- Culture of New York City
