= Raymond Garfield Dandridge =

American poet

Raymond Garfield Dandridge (1882/1883–1930) was an American poet who was born and lived in Cincinnati, Ohio. In 1911, he was affected by hemiplegia, leaving him bedridden for the rest of his life. He subsequently taught himself to write with his left hand. He published three volumes of poetry: Penciled Poems (Powell & White, 1917), The Poet and Other Poems (Powell & White, 1920), and Zalka Peetruza and Other Poems (McDonald, 1928). Influenced by Paul Laurence Dunbar, he wrote many of his poems in African-American dialect. He made his living primarily by selling coal by telephone, and was also literary editor of the Cincinnati Journal.
