= Jonathan Bowers House =

Historic house in Massachusetts, United States

- U.S. National Register of Historic Places
- U.S. Historic district – Contributing property
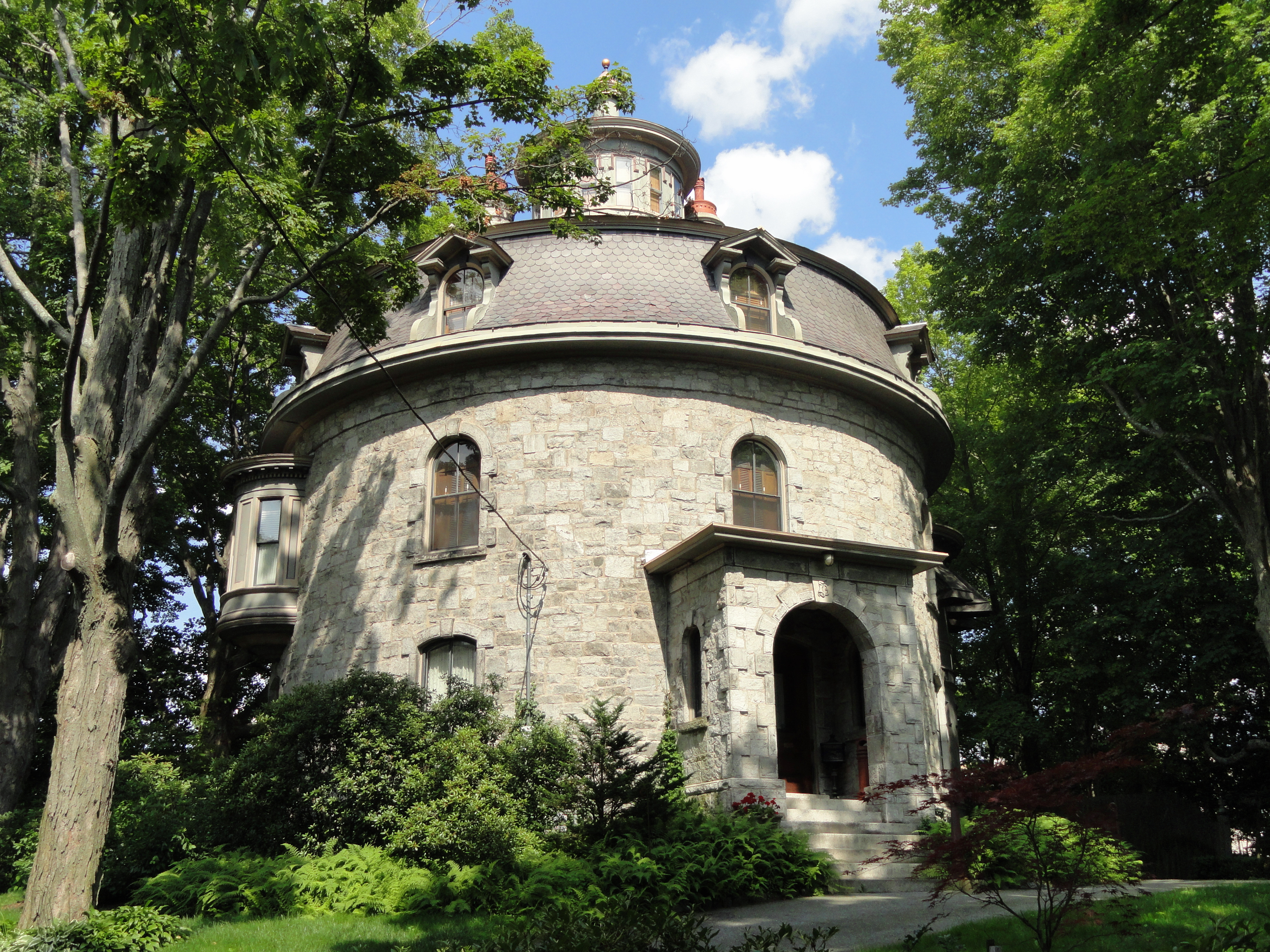

- Location within Massachusetts Location within the United States
- Location: 58 Wannalancit St., Lowell, Massachusetts
- Coordinates: 42°38′46″N 71°19′42″W
- Built: 1872
- Architectural style: Second Empire
- Part of: Wannalancit Street Historic District (ID98000541)
- NRHP reference No.: 76000253

Significant dates
- Added to NRHP: June 18, 1976
- Designated CP: May 20, 1998

The Jonathan Bowers House is an historic house in Lowell, Massachusetts. Built in 1872 for a local businessman, it is one of the most unusual houses in Massachusetts, being a circular masonry building with Second Empire styling. It was listed on the National Register of Historic Places in 1976.

== Description and history ==
The Jonathan Bowers House stands on the east side of Wannalancit Street, a residential street just east of the Pawtucket Canal west of downtown Lowell. It is set at the top of a low rise traversed by the north–south road. It is 2 1/2 stories in height, and is built out of locally quarried granite. It is circular in shape, and is topped by a mansard roof with fish-scale slate shingles. At the center of the roof is a circular cupola with belvedere. The roof is pierced by pedimented gable dormers in a classic Second Empire style, and by a circular chimney.

The house was built on land long owned by the Bowers family, but was subdivided for development around 1850. It was built in 1872 by Jonathan Bowers, a local industrialist who owned a sawmill and a granite quarry, as well as an amusement park in nearby Tyngsborough. The materials to build the house (its exterior stonework and interior woodwork) came from Bowers' businesses. Bowers occupied the house until 1879, after which it was owned by a dealer in plumbing and metals. From 1919 to 1924 it was owned by a French-American social club, the Club Lafayette. Returned to private ownership, it has since served mainly as a residence, also housing a small law office for a time. It is one of Lowell's most unusual architectural landmarks.

== See also ==
- National Register of Historic Places listings in Lowell, Massachusetts
