= Bauer Kompressoren =

German compressor company

Bauer Kompressoren Gruppe
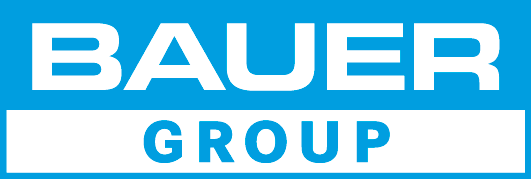
- Logo since 2015

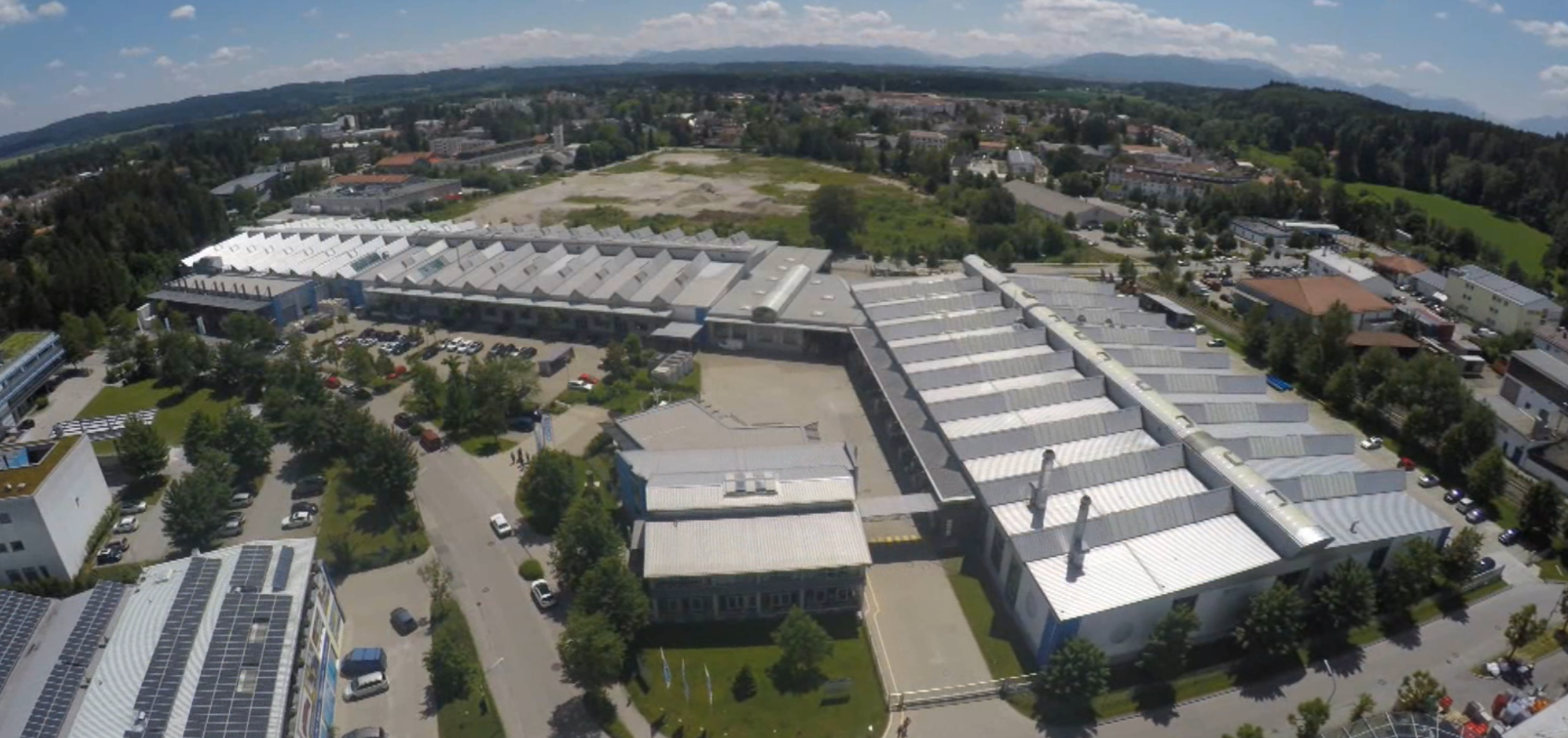
- The Uniccomp and Bauer Kompressoren plants in Geretsried, Bavaria
- Type: Ltd. (GmbH)
- Industry: Machine engineering
- Founded: 1946
- Headquarters: Munich, Germany
- Key people: Monika Bayat, Philipp Bayat
- Revenue: € 435 million
- Number of employees: 1350
- Website: bauer-kompressoren.de

Bauer Kompressoren is a company that produces compressors for air and other gasses. The company was formed in 1946 in Munich and exports 90% of their products.

Its products include compressors which fill breathing air cylinders and are used by fire fighters and divers, air/gas processing and measurement products, natural gas and biogas filling stations and internal gas pressure injection moulding (GIT). Subsidiary company Rotorcomp produces low-pressure compressors.

The company headquarters is in Munich. The company and other subsidiaries were merged in 2004 under the umbrella of Bauer Comp Holding GmbH.

== Corporate Structure ==
The family business is owner-managed by the third generation and is represented worldwide by 22 subsidiaries and 15 independent branches. Bauer Kompressoren GmbH in Munich and Geretsried, Bavaria develops and produces the compression and gas measurement systems together with the other subsidiaries. Additional main development and production sites are located at the U.S. subsidiary Bauer Compressors Inc. in Norfolk, Virginia, Bauer Kompressoren Shanghai Ltd. in China, Bauer Compressors UK Ltd. in England and Bauer Compressors India Pvt. Ltd. In these subsidies, as well as the subsidies in Russia, Japan, South Korea, Australia, Italy, Spain, Austria and France, the continuous increase in added value in the local markets is part of the Group's core strategy.

The business focus for the subsidiaries in Egypt, Singapore and the United Arab Emirates lie within the area of sales and service.

In addition to the subsidies and independent branches, the Bauer Group claims to have a global network of around 350 sales partners and 600 service points.

The purpose of the Bauer Comp Holding GmbH is to regulate the companies within the Group and focus on strategy, management, controlling and finance within these.

== Product Areas ==
=== Breathing Air ===
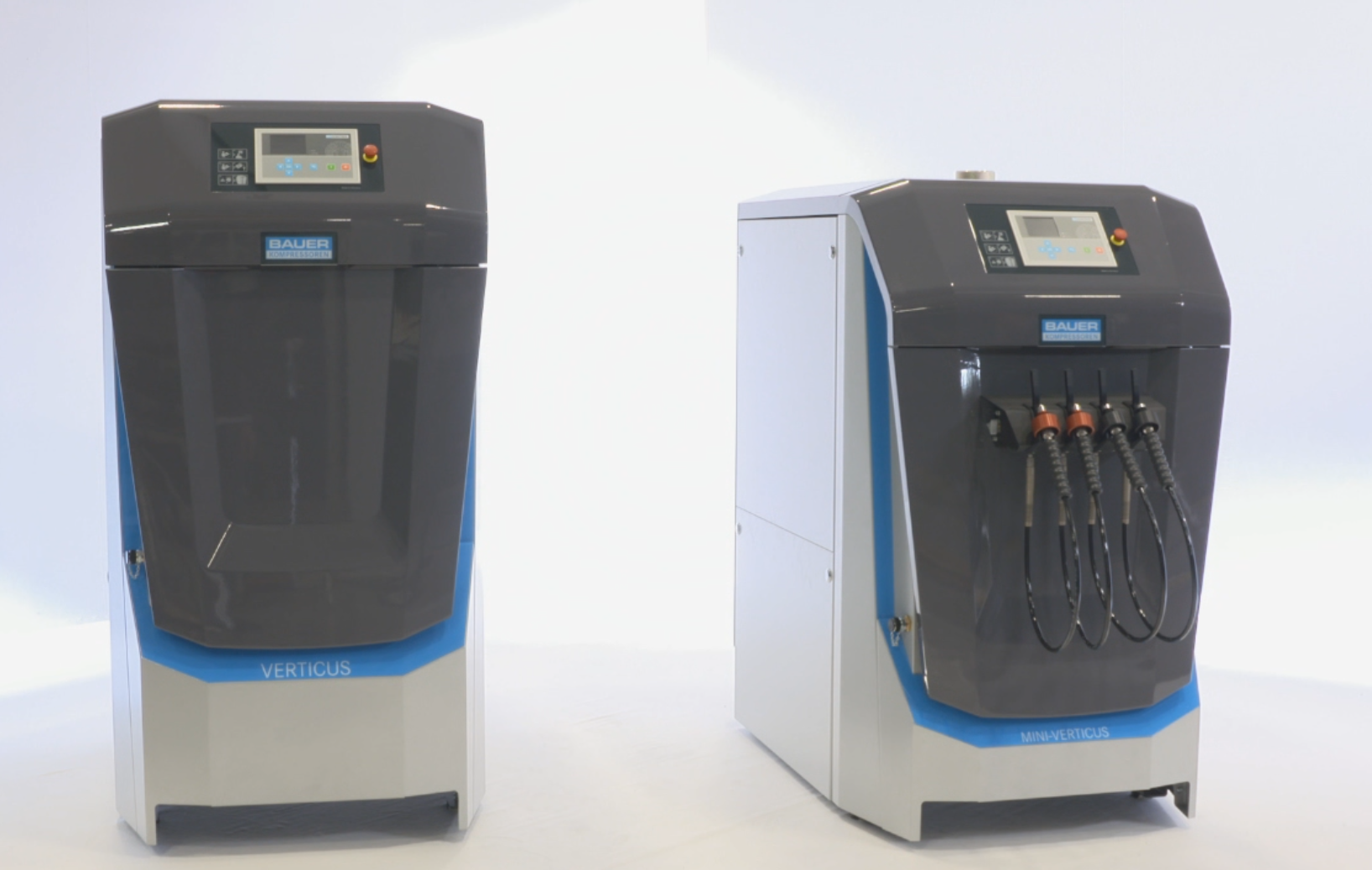
Compressor systems for compressing breathing air: "Verticus" and "Mini-Verticus"

Bauer Kompressoren develops and markets mobile and stationary breathing air compressors and air treatment systems. These are used for and in a variety of different field, such as but not limited to diving, fire departments, civil defence as well as medical technology and breathing air protection rooms for onshore and offshore industry. The breathing air compressors are suitable for use in pressure ranges between 220 and 500 bar, with delivery capacities between a hundred and several thousand liters per minute. Bauer Kompressoren also manufactures compression systems for Nitrox, an oxygen mixture popular in diving.

Furthermore, the Bauer Group develops and produces gas measurement systems which, when used, ensure that pollutant-free breathing air is filled into the breathing air cylinders.

The Bauer Group is the world market leader in breathing air applications for diving.

=== Industry ===
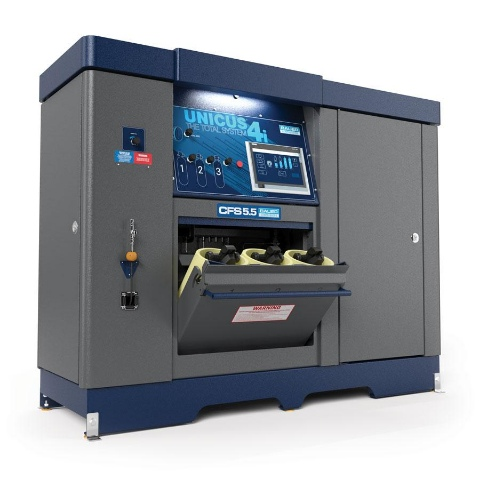
Breathing air compressor "Unicus 4i" with RFID technology.

The industrial compressors from Bauer Kompressoren, for air compression in the medium and high-pressure ranges, are suitable for pressure ranges from 25 to 500 bar (for gases, 90 to 500 bar), and for hydrogen applications, up to 900 bar. The company also builds compressors for compressing noble gases (argon, helium), protective gas (nitrogen) and hydrocarbons such as methane, nitrous oxide and mixed gases. The company also builds nitrogen generators for the extraction of N_{2} from the air and compression for various applications. such as laser cutting, deactivating flammable media, preserving food and operating environmentally friendly "dual fuel" marine engines.

The compressors from Bauer are used in various other areas from: laboratories in research institutions and universities and in clinics (medical breathing air supply systems) through to applications in the oil and gas industry, in the energy sector (e.g. in hydropower plants), in vehicles, aerospace and shipbuilding, in petrochemical and food industries and mining. In addition, there are special projects such as the "waterlifting systems" for irrigation of higher agricultural areas in the India in Telangana.

Bauer Compressors UK Ltd. in Great Britain specialises in the manufacturing of special systems in large projects. For example, the compressed air-powered control system for the world's largest work-ship, the Pioneering Spirit, was built by them.

=== Natural Gas and Biogas Systems ===
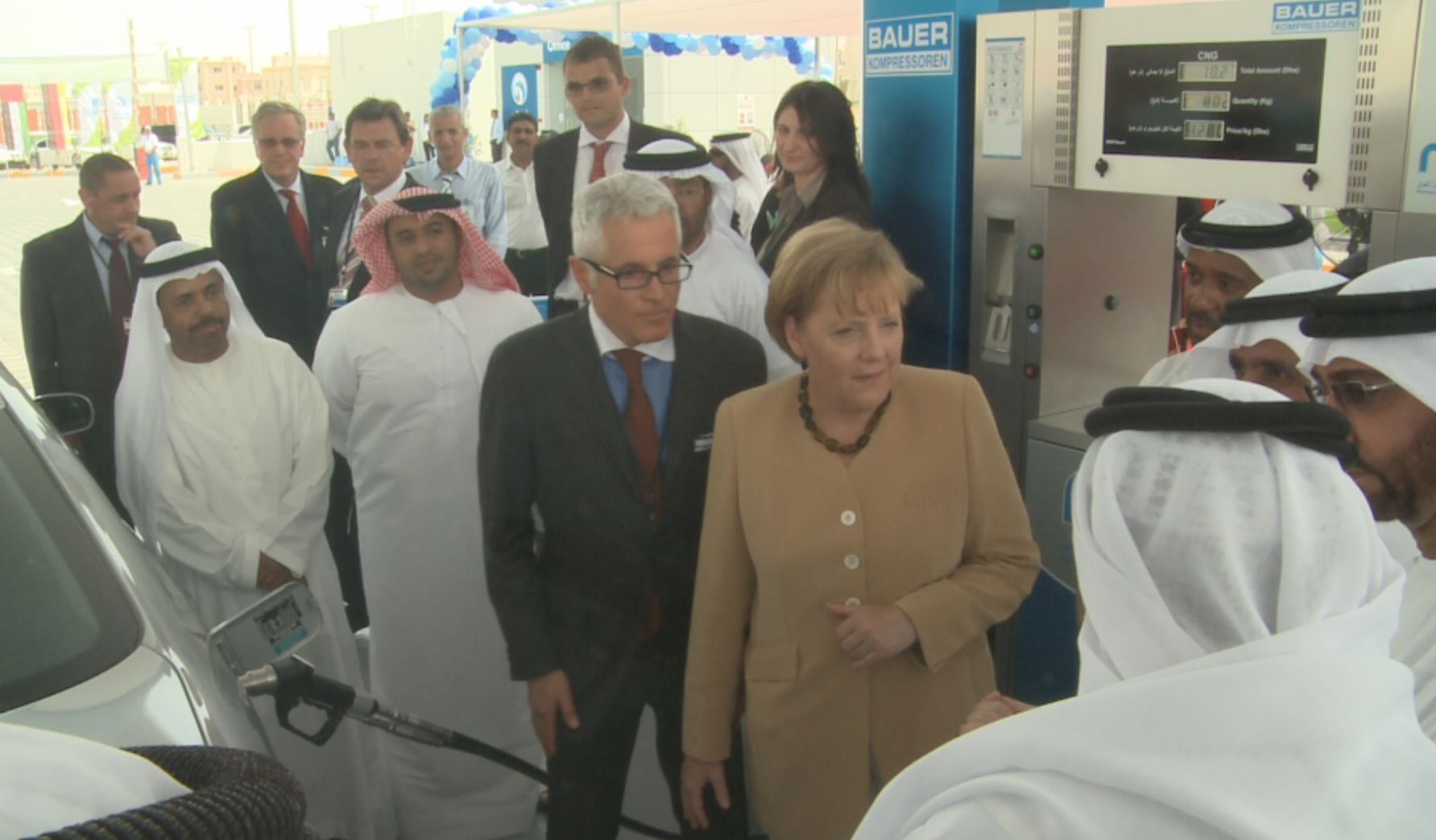
Angela Merkel at the inauguration of a natural gas filling station from Bauer Kompressoren in Abu Dhabi in 2010. Next to her is Philipp Bayat from the Bauer Group.

Bauer produces filling stations for compressed natural gas (CNG) and biogas. Since the mid-1990s, the company has built more than 1,650 CNG filling stations for natural gas vehicles for the private and public sectors worldwide. In Europe, Bauer Kompressoren is one of the market leaders in this segment. Custom-made products are designed for extreme temperatures of up to ± 50 degrees Celsius.

Since 2010 in Abu Dhabi, the Group and their cooperation partner ADNOC, the state oil and gas company, have been working on the developing and maintaining the Emirate's network for natural gas filling stations. A total of 37 natural gas filling stations were built by 2020. Further partnerships include the Air Liquide company in the biogas sector, their current project focuses on converting logistics from the company Carrefour to run on biogas by working together with Southern California Gas Company and the biogas segment from E.On.

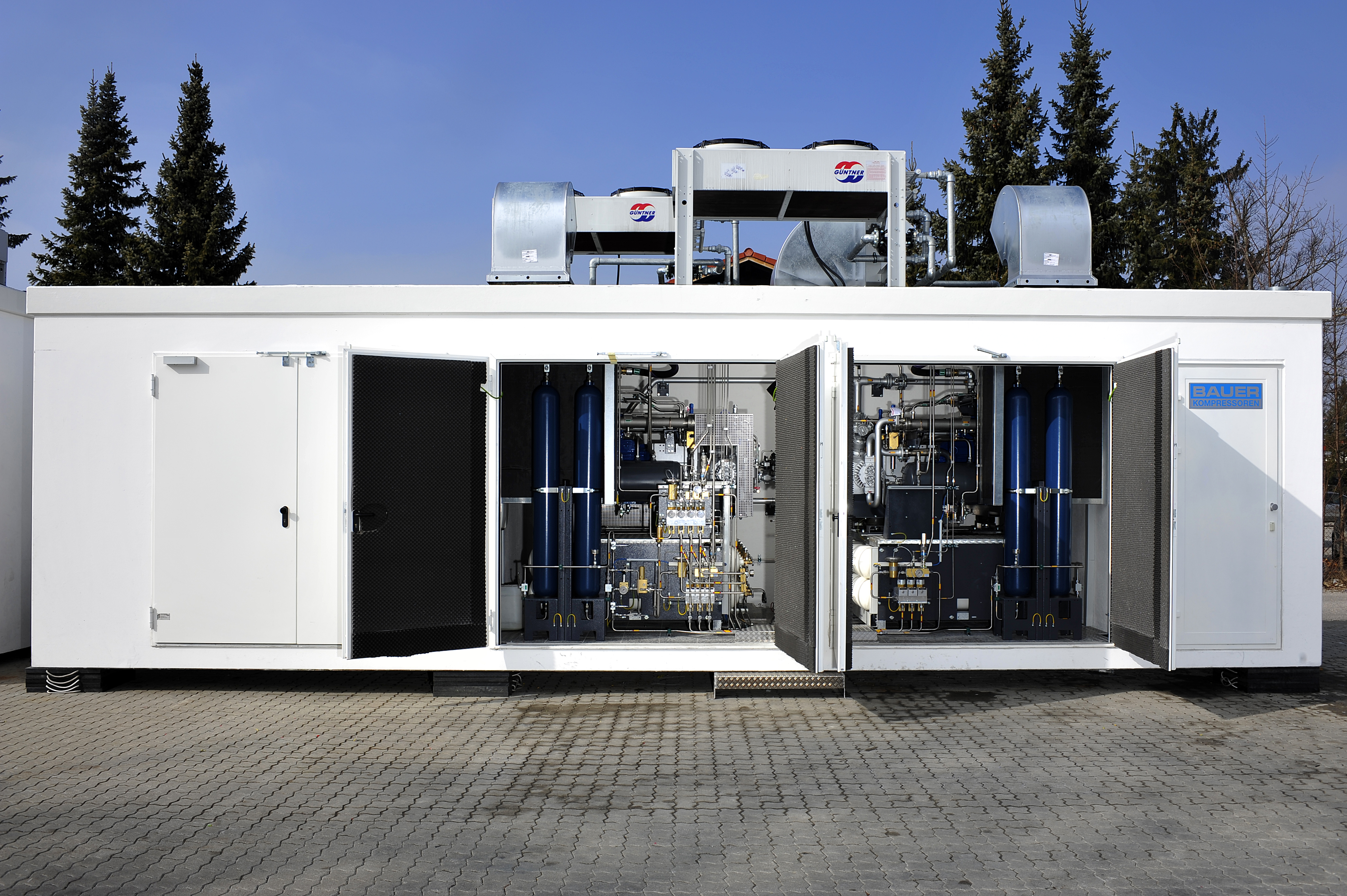
Bauer Kompressoren natural gas filling station.

The Bauer Group is a member of the "Wasserstoffbündnis Bayern” (Bavarian Hydrogen Alliance).

=== Gas Injection Moulding ===
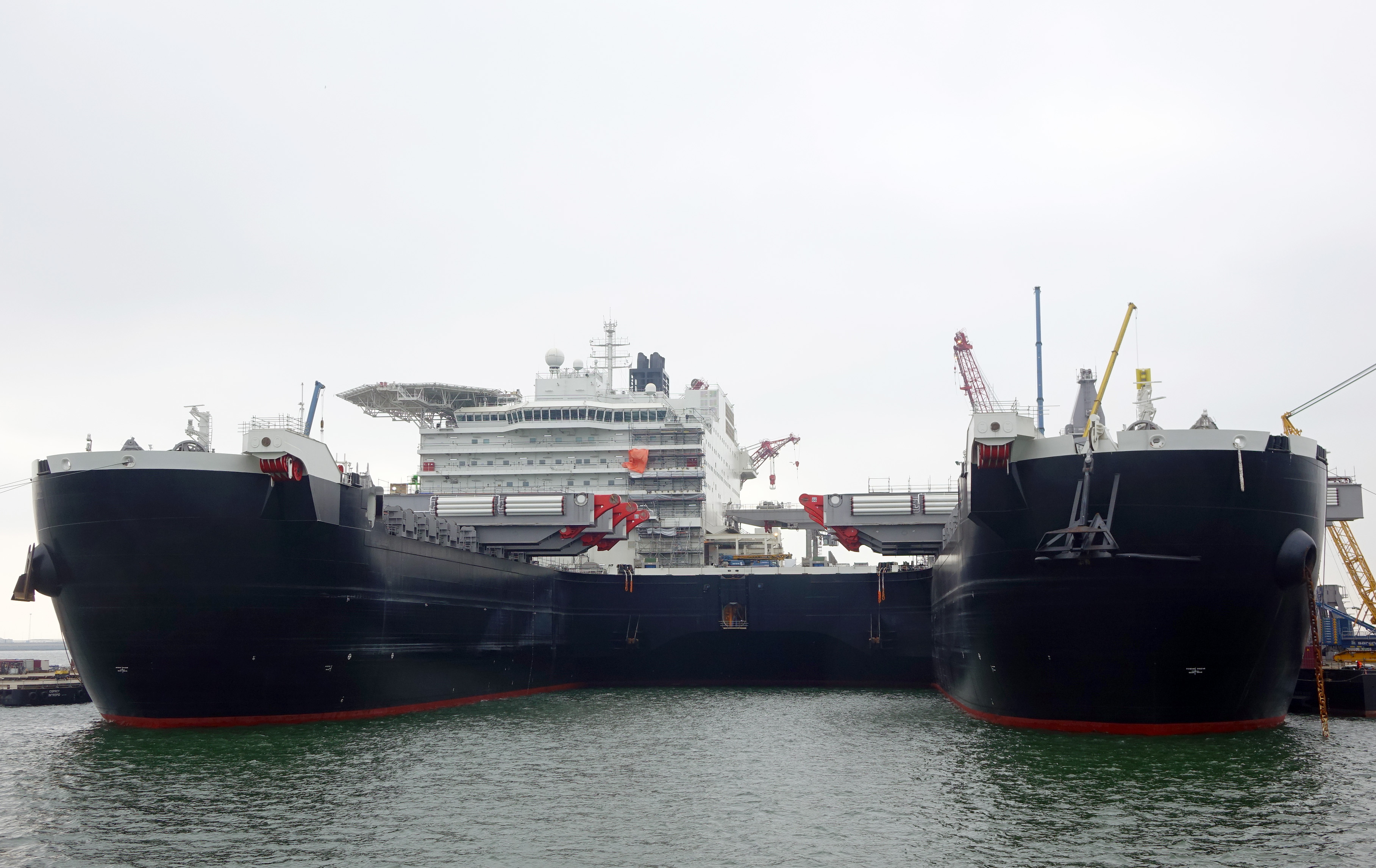
The double hull of the Pioneering Spirit.

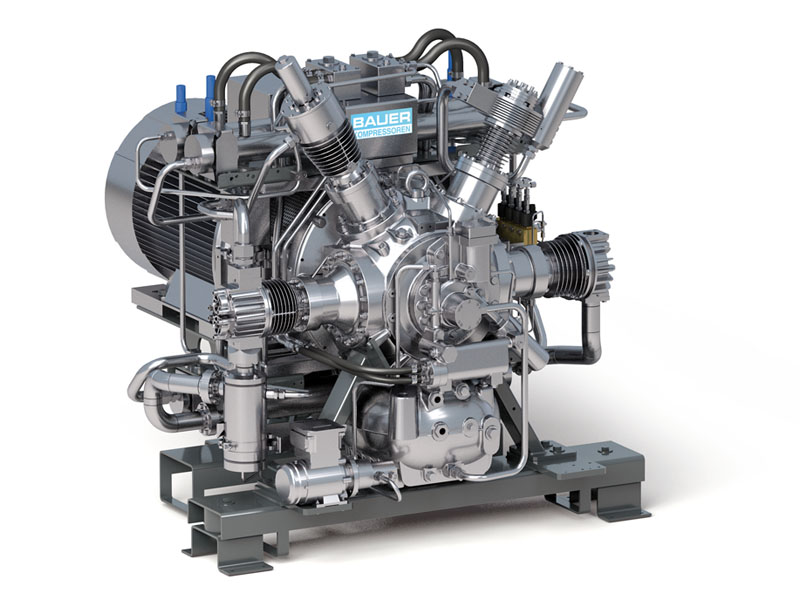
Bauer "GIB 26" compressor with water cooling.

Bauer is one of the manufacturers of internal gas pressure injection moulding, a specialised injection moulding technique that is used, among other things, in the manufacturing of plastic parts for the automotive industry, smartphones, white label products and in various other industries, such as medical technology. In cooperation with injection moulding machine manufacturers such as Engel Austria, Bauer develops control and management systems, low-pressure and high-pressure booster systems and systems for the local production of nitrogen which is used as an inert gas.

== History ==
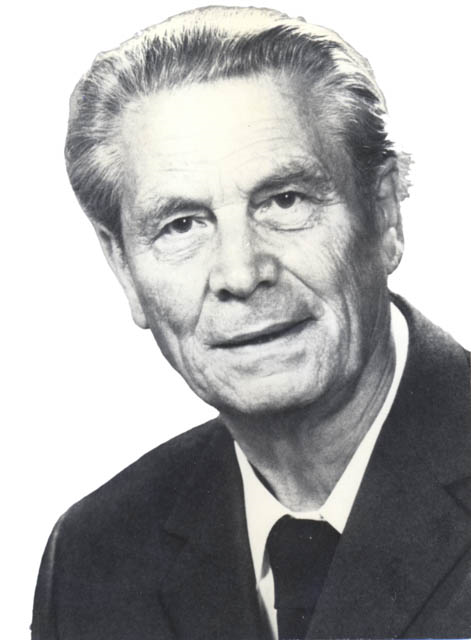
Hans Bauer, the founder of Bauer Kompressoren.

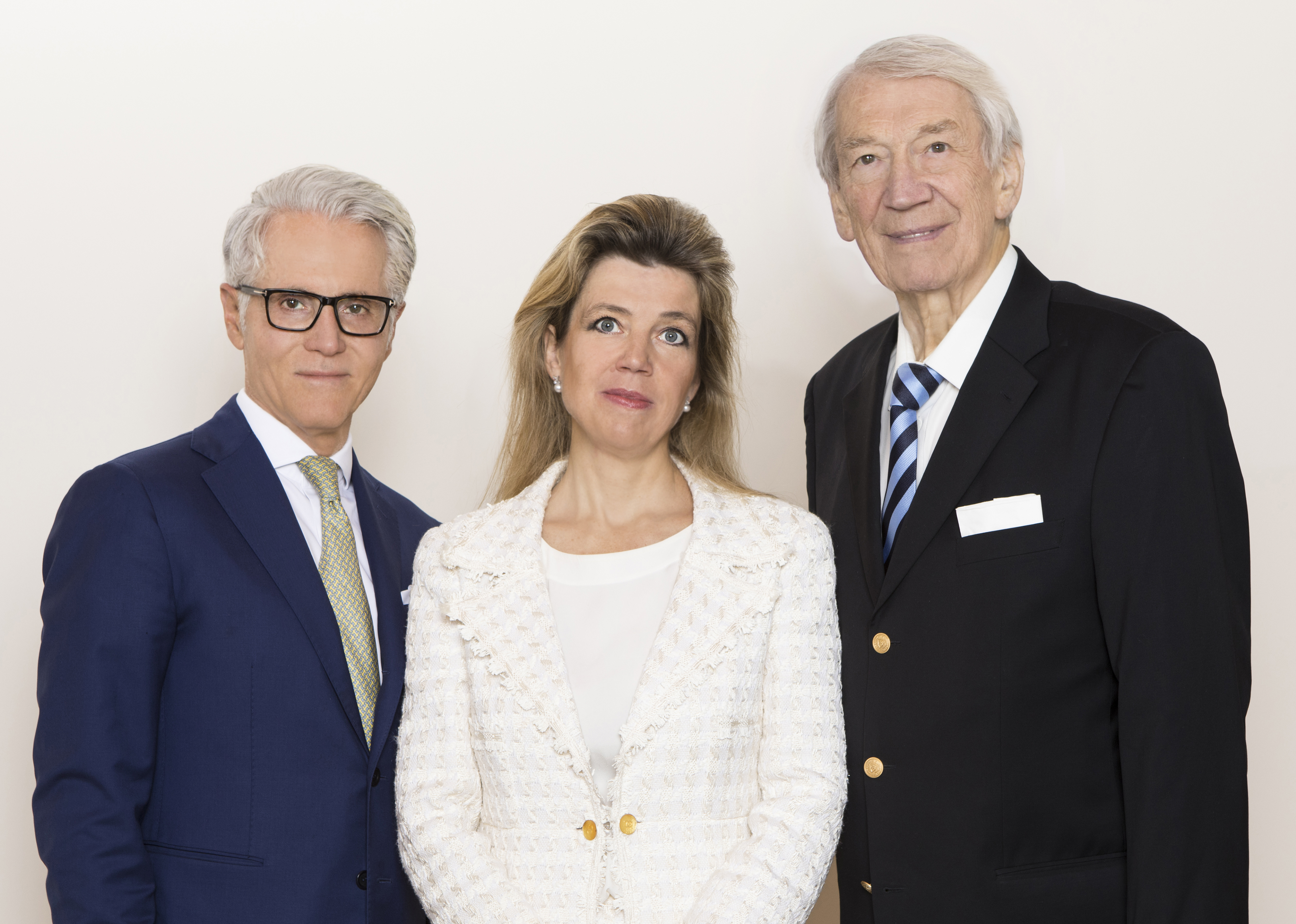
From right to left: Heinz Bauer, Dr. Monika Bayat, daughter of Heinz Bauer, owner and managing partner, Philipp Bayat, chairman of the management.

In 1946, Hans Bauer founded Bauer Kompressoren in his private home in Munich.

In 1952, Bauer developed the company's first breathing air compressor. The company was advised by Jacques Yves Cousteau.

In 1976, Heinz Bauer, Hans Bauer's son, took over the management of the company. The company then established its first U.S. subsidiary, Bauer Compressors Inc. in Norfolk, Virginia.

In 1980, Bauer Kompressoren opened the first natural gas filling stations in the USA. In the same year, Bauer founded the independent subsidiary Rotorcomp Verdichter GmbH in Germany for the manufacture of screw compressors and their components.

In 2012, the company was passed on to Dr. Monika Bayat, the daughter of Heinz Bauer. Since then, she has been running the company with her husband, Philipp Bayat.

== Digitalisation ==
In 2014, the Group received the "SAP Quality Award" in the "Cloud Innovation" category for the implementation of digitisation in all the branches worldwide. The company's customers can use the in-house cloud to monitor and control the entire compression and gas measurement systems using applications such as "Bauer Connect IOT". This data can in turn be further integrated in the production process.

== Environmental Management ==
Since 2020, the company has been integrating its production and management processes into an existing quality management system as part of an ISO 14001 environmental management system.

== Research Project Support ==
Bauer Kompressoren supports research institutions, especially in the area of marine research, by providing free compressor systems and compressor maintenance. Research institutions and projects include the University of Rostock, marine biology research as the part of the Polarstern mission, the research and media ship Aldebaran and the Australian NGO "Great Barrier Reef Legacy", which researches coral death on the Great Barrier Reef.

== Trivia ==
With the air supply from Bauer Kompressoren, the Australian marine biologist Lloyd Godson was able to stay under water for 14 days and thus set a new world record.

When a youth soccer team was rescued from a cave in Thailand, which attracted international attention in 2018, the breathing air supply was ensured with Bauer Kompressoren.

== Literature ==
- Avery, Jack: Gas Assist Molding. Munich 2001
- Lexikon der deutschen Familienunternehmen. Hrsgg. von Florian Langenscheidt und Peter May. Köln 2020, 3. Auflage.
- Lexikon der deutschen Weltmarktführer. Hrsg. von Florian Langenscheidt und Bernd Venohr. Köln 2014.
- The Best of German Engineering. Hrsgg. von Olaf Salié u. a. Frankfurt/Main 2013.
- Tradition und Innovation. Bayerische Familienunternehmen und ihre Erfolgsgeschichten. Hrsgg. von Andreas E. Mach und Luitpold Prinz von Bayern. München 2015.
