= Ralph Lee Bowerman =

American songwriter

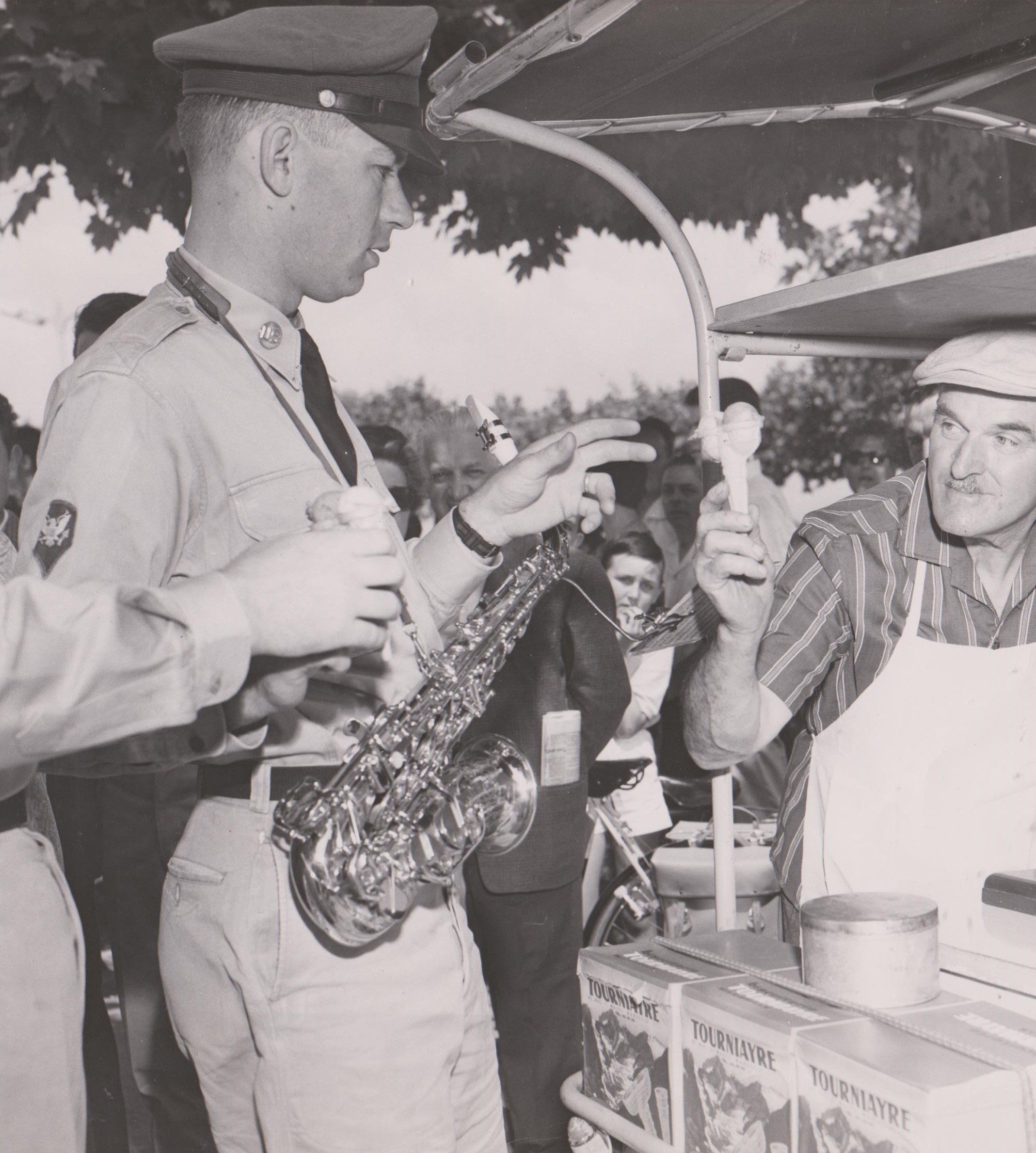
- Bowerman taking a break while performing with the US Army band in France, 1961

Background information
- Born: August 14, 1934
- Died: October 19, 2015 (aged 81)
- Occupations: Composer, songwriter, musician, soldier
- Instrument: Saxophone
- Formerly of: Dual State Band

Master Sergeant Ralph Lee Bowerman (US Army, retired; August 14, 1934 in Red Deer, Alberta, Canada – October 19, 2015), was a composer, songwriter, musician and entertainer. A saxophone player since childhood, Ralph Bowerman is best known for winning the US Army Bicentennial Army hymn competition on June 14, 1975, and for the memorial service at Arlington National Cemetery, during which SFC Ralph Lee Bowerman's composition "Mighty Is Our Army," the winning selection from over 1,200 entries in the Army Chaplains' Bicentennial Army Hymn Composers Competition, was presented. Ralph has also performed in a honky tonk band with country singer Loretta Lynn during the early 60's.

A prolific composer, Ralph Bowerman was credited with numerous marches and songs, including the "TDY Blues", the US Army V Corps March "It Will Be Done" , and the US 3rd Armored Division's "Spearhead March". Ralph had also written poetry, which he shared with his family and close friends. On October 19, 2015, Ralph died at home, following a period of declining health. He was buried with full military honors, including a U.S. Army flag and honor guard detail, at the Albert E. Horton Memorial Veterans Cemetery in Suffolk, Virginia.

== Education ==
He received a bachelor's degree in music from St Leo College under the US Army College Program and a master's in Music from Norfolk State University, Norfolk, Virginia.

== Childhood and Early Adulthood ==
Ralph grew up in Alberta, Canada. The son of John and Thelma Bowerman (née Weaver), Ralph helped raise his younger brother John during the Second World War, while his father fought with the Canadian Army's decorated Calgary Highlanders and Black Watch regiments in Europe. Ralph served briefly with the Royal Canadian Navy at Cornwallis, Nova Scotia. After working as a telegraph operator with the Canadian Pacific Railway in British Columbia, Ralph immigrated to the United States.

== US Army career ==
In 1957, Ralph was drafted into the US Army, where he decided to make his career. While assigned to the 2nd Armored Division Band at Fort Hood, Texas, he was a member of a jazz quartet that won 1st place in an Army-wide competition. His quartet then performed on The Ed Sullivan Show, Episode #580 on August 30, 1959. Later, while assigned to the US Army in West Germany, Ralph met and married his wife, Rosemarie Schwenk. Ralph Bowerman also served with the US Army Transportation Corps in Vietnam during the 1969 Tet Offensive, and briefly worked as a personal assistant to US Army General William Westmoreland. After returning from Vietnam, Ralph was assigned to a series of posts in CONUS and Europe, including 3 years in West Germany (1972–74), where SFC Bowerman's responsibilities included establishing emergency deployment march tables for the US Army V Corps in event of a Warsaw Pact offensive.

Ralph's final deployment back to the US took him to the US Armed Forces School of Music, at the US Naval Amphibious Base (Little Creek), Norfolk, VA. Promoted to Master Sergeant, MSG Bowerman was assigned to the joint services school as Senior Enlisted Director, Training Development, US Army Element. Ralph retired in 1980 after 23-year's service, a decorated veteran and recipient of the Meritorious Service Medal and Bronze Star Medal.

Following a period of declining health, Ralph died at home in Norfolk, VA on October 19, 2015.
