= Cristina Bowerman =

Italian chef

- Born: Cerignola, Apulia, Italy
- Education: University of Texas at Austin/Le Cordon Bleu
- Culinary career
- Cooking style: Molecular gastronomy
- Rating(s): Michelin stars
- Current restaurant(s): Glass Hostaria; Romeo Chef & Baker; Giulietta Pizzeria
- Website: www.cristinabowerman.com

Cristina Bowerman is an Italian chef, who holds a Michelin star at Glass Hostaria in Rome. She originally studied foreign languages and law, and worked as a graphic designer. However, she trained at Le Cordon Bleu and began working as a chef when she returned to Italy.

== Biography ==
Cristina Bowerman was born in Apulia, in southern Italy. She first trained in foreign languages and studied law, and then went on to work as a graphic designer in Austin, Texas. Bowerman then studied culinary arts for two years at the University of Texas at Austin and Le Cordon Bleu. She later said that the chef Egil Valentin had been her most significant teacher and praised the experience she gained at David Bull's restaurant, 5 Diamonds.

When she returned to Italy in 2006, Bowerman began working at the Glass Hostaria restaurant in Rome. For the first three years, the restaurant struggled, as although Bowerman would bring in new dishes, the locals wouldn't visit during the week and then only order traditional dishes when they did on the weekend. In 2010, the restaurant was awarded a Michelin star, with Bowerman being the only woman to win one that year. After winning a Michelin star, she opened Romeo Chef & Baker in a former warehouse in Testaccio, and then opened Giulietta Pizzeria next door to it.

She continues to split her time between Rome and Austin. In 2017, she was one of 20 chefs to cook at the 32nd Chef's Tribute to Citymeals. Bowerman was one of the judges for the final of the 2018 S.Pellegrino Young Italian Chef competition.
