= John S. Bowers House =

Historic house in Indiana, United States

- U.S. National Register of Historic Places
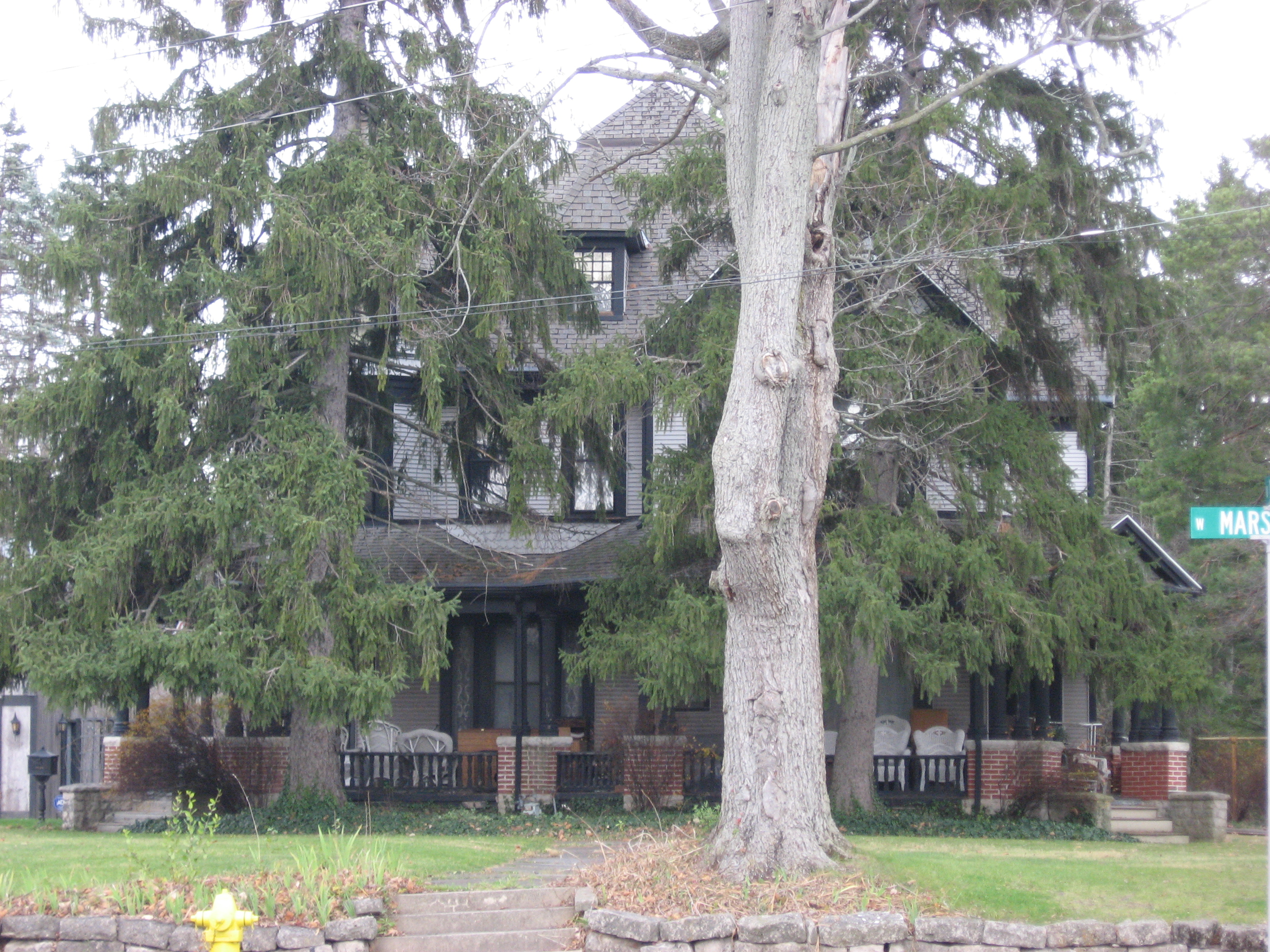
- John S. Bowers House, November 2011

- Location within Adams County, Indiana Location within Indiana Location within the United States
- Location: 104 Marshall St., Decatur, Indiana
- Coordinates: 40°50′4″N 84°55′26″W
- Area: 6.3 acres (2.5 ha)
- Built: c. 1900-1905
- Architectural style: Queen Anne, Tuscan Order
- NRHP reference No.: 82000055
- Added to NRHP: March 5, 1982

John S. Bowers House is a historic home located at Decatur, Indiana. It was built between 1900 and 1905, and is a three-story, Queen Anne style frame dwelling with 14 rooms. It sits on a stone foundation. It features stained glass and lead crystal windows and wraparound porch with Tuscan order columns. It was built by John S. Bowers, who owned a local quarry.

It was listed on the National Register of Historic Places in 1979.
