= Morgan-Bedinger-Dandridge House =

Historic house in West Virginia, United States

- Morgan--Bedinger--Dandridge House
- U.S. National Register of Historic Places
- U.S. Historic district – Contributing property
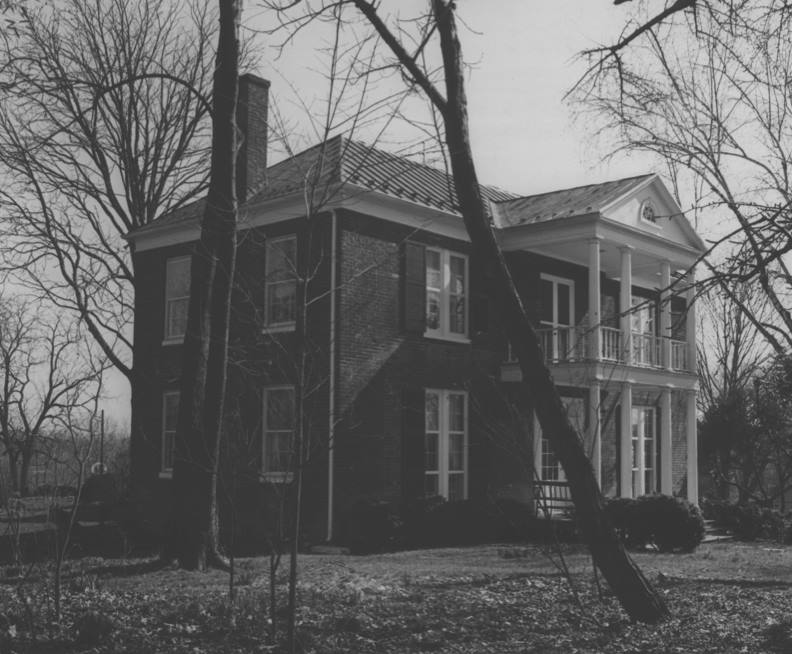

- Location within West Virginia Location within the United States
- Nearest city: Shepherdstown, West Virginia
- Coordinates: 39°25′31.2″N 77°48′46.2″W
- Architectural style: Classical Revival, Georgian
- NRHP reference No.: 83003239
- Added to NRHP: May 13, 1983

The Morgan-Bedinger-Dandridge House — first known as Poplar Grove, then Rosebrake or Rose Brake — is part of a group of structures affiliated with the Morgan's Grove rural historic district near Shepherdstown, West Virginia. The property was known as "Poplar Grove" until 1877.

== History ==
The original building on the site was built around 1745 by settler Richard Morgan (ca. 1700–1763) and became known as the "Back Building". In 1803 the house was expanded by Daniel Morgan with a two-story brick structure, known as the "Great House". Formal gardens were added at this time.

In 1859 the present main portion of the house was built by Caroline Bedinger, widow of Henry Bedinger. During her ownership the house was occupied by Colonel Alexander R. Boteler, a former U.S. Representative who, at the outbreak of the American Civil War became a Confederate officer. After the war, while Boteler was living at Poplar Grove, President U.S. Grant appointed Boteler to the U. S. Centennial Commission.

Caroline's daughter, Danske Bedinger Dandridge, a noted poet, changed the name of the house to "Rosebrake" (sometimes spelled "Rose Brake") in 1877.

A portico was added to the house in 1950, removed from a house on Long Island and shipped to West Virginia.

== See also ==
- The Bower
- Chestnut Grove (plantation)
