= Jed Davis =

Jed Davis may refer to:

- Jed Davis (musician)
- Jed Davis (politician)

== See also ==
- Jed Davies, Welsh football coach
