= Dr. Wesley Bowers House =

Historic house in New York, United States

- U.S. National Register of Historic Places
- Location within New York Location within the United States
- Location: Beach Road, Southampton, New York
- Coordinates: 40°51′19″N 72°26′1″W
- Area: 7.1 acres (2.9 ha)
- Built: 1930
- Architect: Ward, LeRoy P.
- Architectural style: Spanish Colonial Revival, & Late 19th And 20th Century Revivals
- MPS: Southampton Village MRA
- NRHP reference No.: 86002699
- Added to NRHP: October 2, 1986

The Dr. Wesley Bowers House is a historic house located at Southampton in Suffolk County, New York.

== Description and history ==
It is a large, rambling oceanside mansion built in 1930 in the Spanish Colonial Revival style.

It was added to the National Register of Historic Places on October 2, 1986.
