= Bowery Street Grocery Store =

- U.S. National Register of Historic Places
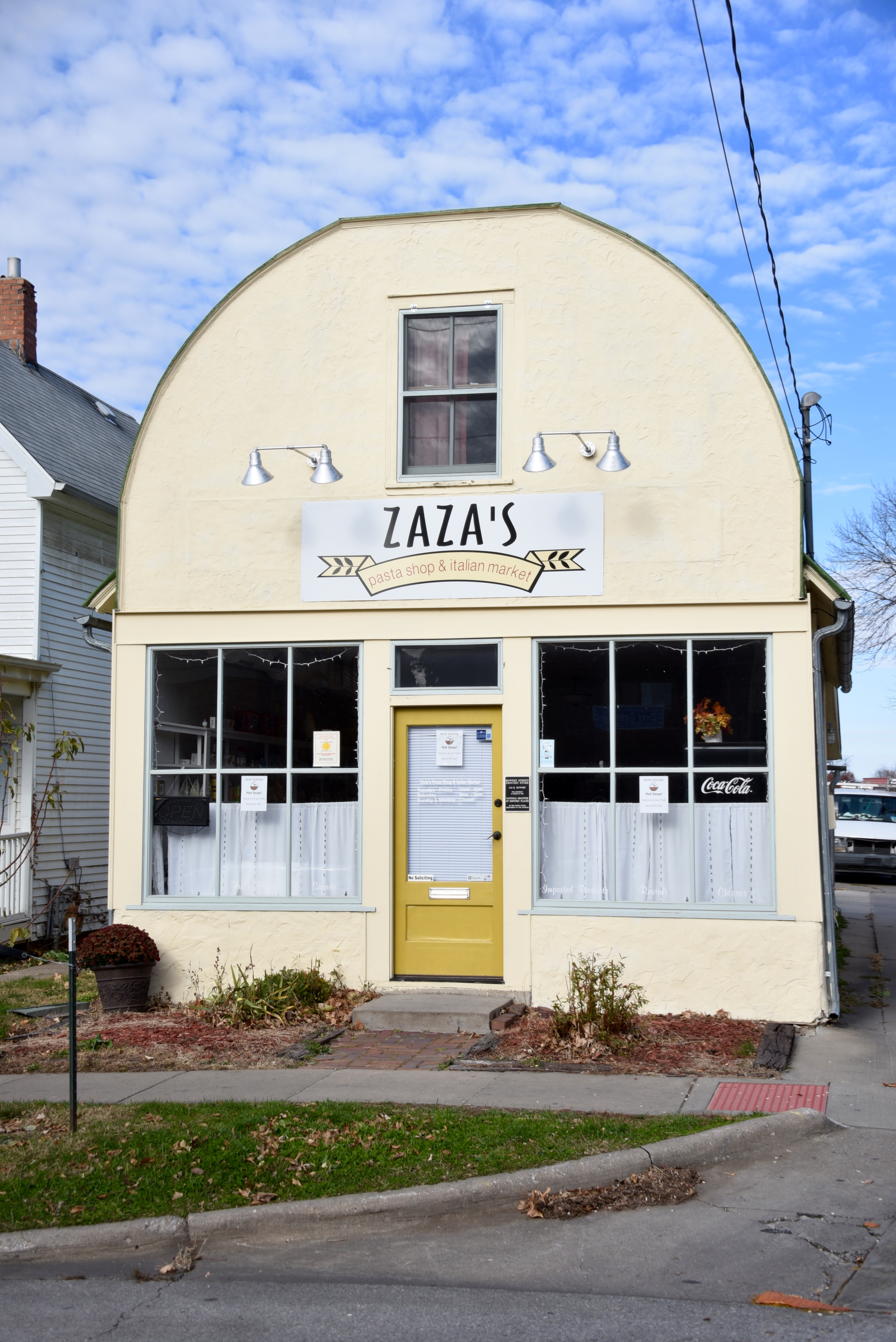

- Location within Iowa Location within the United States
- Location: 518 E. Bowery St. Iowa City, Iowa
- Coordinates: 41°39′22.6″N 91°36′19.4″W
- Area: less than one acre
- NRHP reference No.: 14000112
- Added to NRHP: April 7, 2014

The Bowery Street Grocery Store, also known as Helmer's Grocery and as the New Pioneer Food Cooperative, is a historic building located on the east side of Iowa City, Iowa, United States. The building's construction is consistent with those built in the mid-19th century. The single-story wood-frame structure with the false front was a popular commercial style building that was built in Iowa from that time period. Although the exterior structure has not changed significantly since it was first built, the interior has been renovated heavily. The only original interior feature that remains is the shelving against the building's west wall.

Beginning about 1897 the city directory lists this location as a meat market and grocery store. It would continue to house that type of business, under a variety of owners or renters until 1975. The New Pioneer Food Co-op was the last grocery to occupy the space, beginning in 1971, until it relocated to a larger facility. At some point it was illegally converted into student housing, which was not permitted due to the building's small square footage. The building was listed on the National Register of Historic Places in 2014. As of August, 2023, a coffee shop operates out of the Bowery Street Grocery Store.
