= Ed Dandridge =

American lawyer

Ed Dandridge is a corporate executive who is currently an executive vice president and chief marketing & communications officer at AIG.

== Early life and education ==
Dandridge graduated from Tufts University, cum laude, in 1986 and the University of Pennsylvania School of Law in 1989. The son of a Foreign Service Officer and an educator, Ed grew up in Asia, Europe and the United States.

== Career ==
In 1989, Dandridge took and passed the New York State bar exam and began practicing law at the law firm of Loeb & Loeb in Manhattan. In 1993, he joined the Democratic political consulting firm, Sawyer Miller Group. He worked on public campaigns including the first World Trade Center bombing, NYNEX brand launch, product launch of DirecTV, Showtime’s pay-per-view events and dozens of local and state candidates. In 1996, he became a principal at Sawyer Miller, which had been bought by Interpublic (IPG.)

The next year, he left Sawyer Miller to become Vice President of Communications and Policy Planning for ABC Television Network. Ed was ABC’s senior communications executive with responsibility for programming, talent relations, public affairs, affiliates and sales.[8]

In 2000, he founded BrandSphere Partners, a strategy consulting firm to political candidates, corporations and non-profits. BrandSphere advised political clients including DNC, DCCC, Newark Mayor Cory Booker[6], Kerry/Edwards ’04 and Hillary Clinton for President ’08. BrandSphere’s corporate clients included Accenture, EcoMedia and Merrill Lynch. BrandSphere also worked for non-profits including Pew, Columbia University, NYC Dept of Education and New Leaders for New Schools.

At the end of the Clinton campaign in 2008, he joined the Nielsen Company as Chief Communications Officer.[7] For three years, he led Nielsen's Global Communications organization which managed the company's brand, corporate reputation and thought leadership in more than 100 countries. During that time, Nielsen successfully navigated the global economic crisis in 2008, the digital transition in 2009, filed its S1 in 2010 and went public in 2011. Dandridge is credited with centralizing marketing communications into a global corporate organization accountable to the Office of the CEO, which produced significant cost savings and an enhanced corporate reputation.

In December 2011, he was appointed President and CEO of the National Association of Investment Companies, the industry association representing emerging investment managers and global emerging markets.

From February 2013 to February 2014, he served as Chief Marketing Officer of Collective, a data-driven digital technology company.

In March 2014, Dandridge joined Marsh & McLennan Companies (NYSE: MMC), where he served as Chief Marketing & Communications Officer. In addition to this corporate role, Ed also served as Chief Marketing & Communications Officer for MMC's Risk & Insurance Services businesses, which are Marsh and Guy Carpenter.

In 2018, Dandridge joined American International Group (AIG) to lead marketing and communications for the company's newly-formed General Insurance division, which includes AIG’s commercial, personal insurance, and international field operations. He served as Global Head of Marketing and Communications for AIG's General Insurance business.

In September 2020, Boeing hired Dandridge as the company's chief communications officer, reporting to president and CEO David Calhoun. Dandridge leads all of Boeing's communications strategy, and also serves on the company's executive council leadership committee. In June 2022, Dandridge tendered his resignation from Boeing due to personal issues requiring his full attention.

In October 2023, Dandridge re-joined AIG to lead the global teams responsible for shaping the firm’s corporate reputation, overseeing brand, marketing, external and internal communications. His focus is on supporting AIG’s global businesses to enhance the company’s brand presence in the marketplace and strategically position it for sustained growth and profitability.
