= Design director =

Designation in various creative industries

A design director (also called Director of Design) is a position found within the software development, web development, product design, advertising, media, automotive or movie industries. It may be useful in other product focused organizations as well. The duties are similar to those of a creative director but with greater emphasis on technical design and production along with creative and ideas. The design director oversees the design of branding, product, UI, UX, Print, Advertising for a client, ensuring that the design elements fits in with the client's requirements and the product fits the design brief the client wish to promote for their company or product. However, unlike a creative director, the design director is also responsible for the overall quality of the final creative work and the quality of the project's design elements.

The distinction between the two positions is that advertising creative directors are usually promoted from copyrighting or art directing positions. Design directors, are promoted from senior designer positions. Design directors also require a much greater technical understanding of design process and techniques with cross platform and multi-disciplinary team application of their work also common place. As a role design directors are not only concerned with the creative elements, but also business, production and user facing experiences.

== See also ==
- Design
- Creativity
- Artistic inspiration
- Communication
