= Bowers, Staffordshire =

Coordinates: 52.917°N 2.272°W

Bowers
- Location within Staffordshire
- OS grid reference: SJ8135
- Shire county: Staffordshire
- Region: West Midlands
- Country: England
- Sovereign state: United Kingdom
- Post town: Stafford
- Postcode district: ST21
- Police: Staffordshire
- Fire: Staffordshire
- Ambulance: West Midlands

Bowers is a village in Staffordshire, England. For population details as taken in the 2011 census see Standon.
