= Hetty Bower =

British political activist and suffragette (1905–2013)

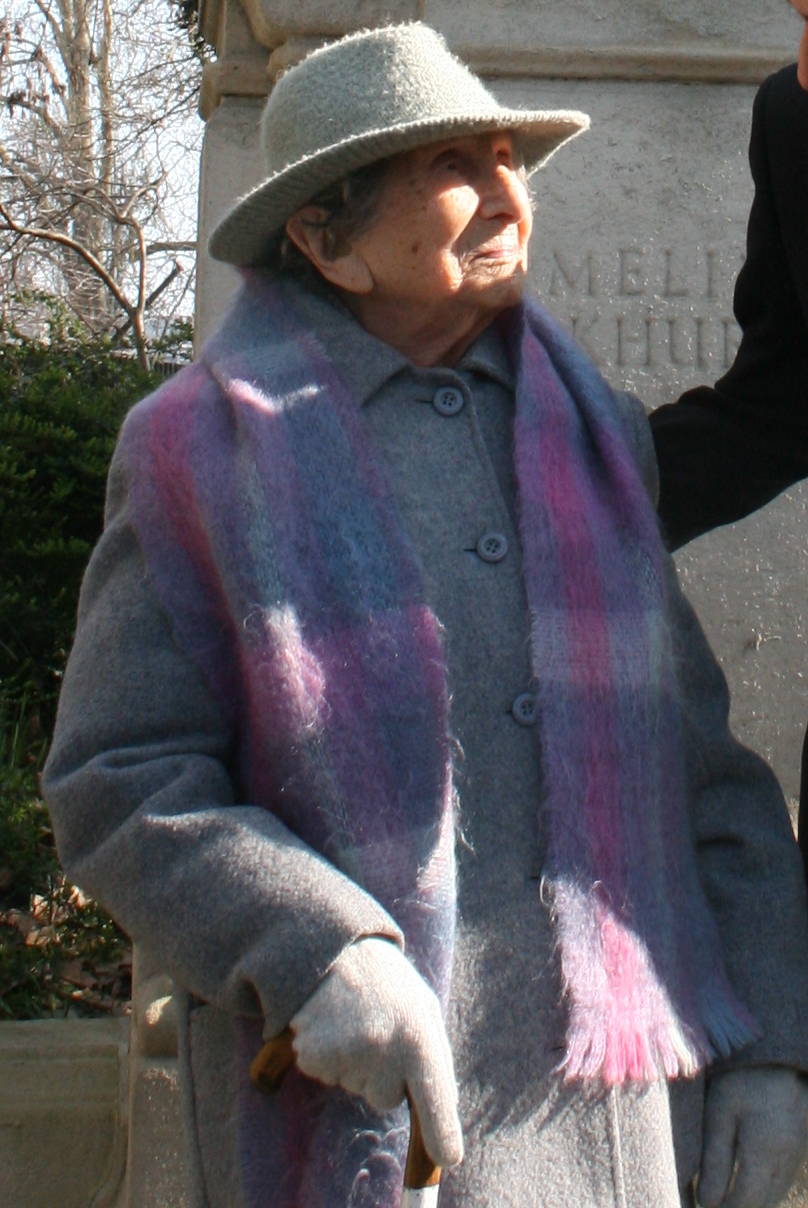
- Bower in 2011
- Born: Esther Rimel; 3 October 1905; Dalston, London, England
- Died: 12 November 2013 (aged 108); Hampstead, London, England
- Occupations: Political activist and suffragette
- Spouse: Reginald Bower (m. 1932; died 2001)

Hetty Bower (née Rimel; 3 October 1905 – 12 November 2013) was a British political activist and suffragette, known for devoting her life to political campaigning since the early 1920s. Before the founding of the UK NHS, she said, "Families were forced to choose between buying medicine for their children or a loaf of bread... We must never ever go back to those days. She marched against welfare cuts, austerity and the closure of Whittington Hospital in North London.

== Biography ==
Bower was born in 1905 in Dalston, East London, when King Edward VII was the monarch and women were not given the right to vote in general elections. She was the seventh of ten children, and worked in schools, fashion, business and cinema. She founded the first women's association. As she grew older, she was inspired to campaign by her sister, Cissie Rimel. In 1923, aged 17, Bower joined the Labour Party. As a Labour party member, Bower participated in the 1926 General Strike and the Battle of Cable Street in 1936. Her husband was Reginald Bower.

During World War II, Bower ran a refugee hostel for people departing Czechoslovakia. She was also a founding member of the Campaign For Nuclear Disarmament, better known as CND, in 1957. In her remaining years, she was invited to several political campaigning events. She enjoyed opera and liked listening to Caruso.

She was 108 when she died, two months after giving a speech at the 2013 Labour Party Conference campaigning for peace and equal rights. Her last words were "Ban the bomb for ever". Upon her death, tributes were paid by Labour leader Ed Miliband, Shadow Home Secretary Yvette Cooper and Green Party leader Natalie Bennett. She had met Miliband and Cooper at the 100th International Women's Day in 2011. The same year, The Guardian named her woman of the year.

Bower lived in a Highgate residential home and died at the Royal Free Hospital in Hampstead.
