= Robert Bower =

Robert Bower may refer to:

- Robert Bower (died 1606), MP for Salisbury
- Sir Robert Lister Bower (1860–1929), British Army, colonial and police officer
- Robert W. Bower (1936–2024), American applied physicist
- Robert Bower (Conservative politician) (1894–1975), British Conservative politician, MP for Cleveland, 1931–1945

== See also ==
- Bower (disambiguation)
- Robert (disambiguation)
- Robert Bowers (disambiguation)
