= Bower, West Virginia =

Coordinates: 38°51′30″N 80°43′11″W

Bower is an extinct town in Braxton County, in the U.S. state of West Virginia. The GNIS classifies it as a populated place.

== History ==
A post office called Bower was established in 1906, and remained in operation until 1941. The community had the name of Henry Bower, a railroad official.
