= Danske Dandridge =

American poet

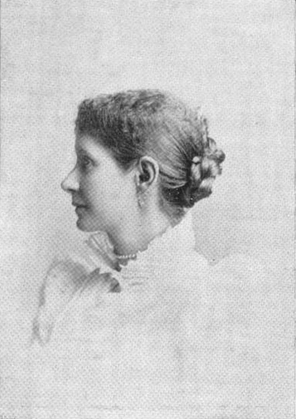
- Born: Caroline "Danske" Bedinger; November 19, 1854; Copenhagen, Denmark
- Died: June 4, 1914 (aged 59); Shepherdstown, West Virginia, U.S.
- Occupations: poet, historian, garden writer
- Spouse(s): Adam Stephen Dandridge, Jr. (m. 1877)
- Children: 3, including Violet Dandridge
- Writing career
- Language: English

Danske Dandridge (November 19, 1854 – June 3, 1914) was a Danish-born American poet, historian, and garden writer. Along with her contemporaries, Waitman T. Barbe and Thomas Dunn English, Dandridge was considered a major poet of late 19th-century West Virginia.

By marriage, Dandridge secured not only the sympathy, encouragement and criticism she needed, but alliteration of name. She had scribbled verses since she was a child of eight. But the morbid, sensitive child had not attempted ambitious verse, nor did she as a grown woman till she had been married some years. Her works were Joy and Other Poems, Twilight in the Woods, The Lover in the Woods, Rose Brake, and miscellaneous contributions to the periodicals.

== Early years and education ==
Caroline "Danske" Bedinger was born on November 19, 1854, in Copenhagen, Denmark. Her father, Hon. Henry Bedinger, was the first United States ambassador to Denmark, having been appointed by President Buchanan. He wrote poems for The Southern Literary Messenger. Her mother, Caroline Lawrence Bedinger (from Rhode Island), was a granddaughter of Eliza Southgate Bowne (1797–1802), whose “Letters of a Young Girl Eighty Years Ago” gave a picture of New England society in the early years of the 19th century.

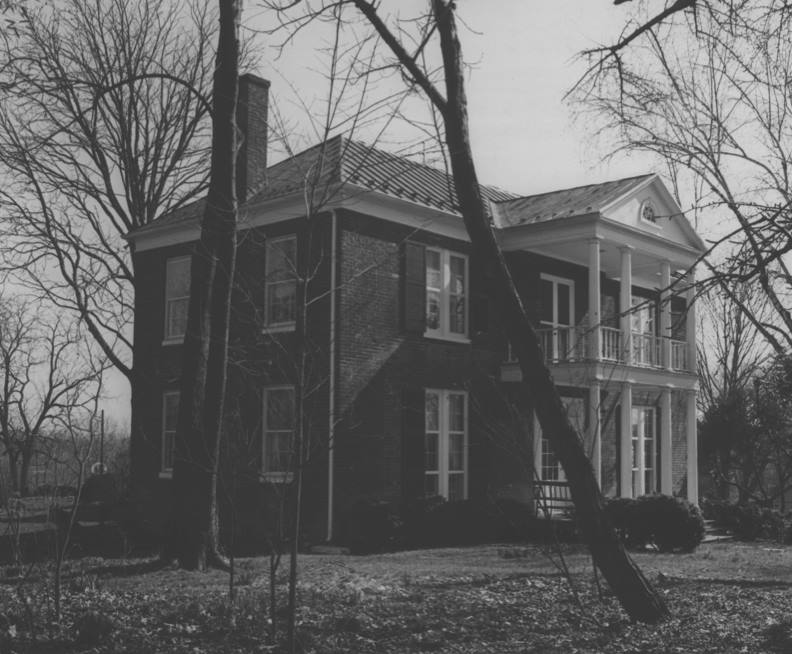
Rose Brake

She was brought to the United States in 1857, living in Flushing, New York. Mr. Bedinger's death took place shortly before the beginning of the American Civil War, and his widow returned with her three children – of whom Danske was the youngest — to the homestead at Shepherdstown, Virginia. In Shepherdstown, her mother purchased an estate called "Poplar Grove", renaming it "Rose Brake" and here the family cared for wounded soldiers during the Battle of Antietam. She did not survive her husband many years; and the orphans were taken into the care of their grandfather, Hon. J. W. Lawrence, at Flushing, Long Island.

Dandridge was frail in health and nervous in temperament. Early in life, she developed the practice of singing, and, later, the study of the composition of verse. She wrote in rhyme from childhood, but refrained from publishing until her work was no longer immature.

== Career ==
Danske married Adam Stephen Dandridge, Jr. on May 3, 1877, and they moved back to Shepherdstown. He owned an agricultural implements and machinery shop, and like his wife, was a member of a prominent Virginia family. The Dandridges went on to have three children. Her husband was not rich, and they lived upon a farm. Thus, Dandridge did not have access to books or opportunities for literary culture. At times, she did not have a dictionary, and she was burdened with ill health.

She began writing poetry again in 1883 and had her first poem, "Chrysanthemum", published in Godey's Lady's Book in 1885. She renamed her husband's Shepherdstown family home "Rose Brake" at about the same time. In the following summer, she wrote “The Lover in the Woods” for Lippincott's Monthly Magazine; and “Twilight in the Woods” for the New York Independent. To the latter journal, she was a constant and favorite contributor, writing also for various magazines and other periodicals. Her first volume, entitled Joy, and Other Poems (G.P. Putnam's Sons, 1888), a collection of fugitive verses, made a distinct impression. The critics united in praise of the delicate, aerial music, the sensitive sympathy with nature, the luminous and capricious fancy, and the bright and healthful tone of these poems. Dandridge never overstrained the clear light voice that is hers; not even when she touches tragic notes, as in the finely imaginative ode, “The Dead Moon,” or in the more directly human theme of the terse and significant lyric, “Fate.” Her comprehension and utterance of the realities of life appeared delicately remote. The volume was also recalled as a sweet, simple first venture. None of the poems were profound or great; but many were striking for thought and expression, and they all had a delicate freshness.

The second volume of poems by Dandridge was published in 1890. It took its title, “Rose Brake,” from the name of her estate in Shepherdstown. One reviewer stated that the volume fully confirmed the favorable impression already made by her first publication. In the poem "Fancy", she was said to have excelled; while in the expression of sentiment less imaginative, her work was good, but not surpassing. Yet another reviewer stated that Dandridge's first volume, Joy and Other Poems, raised hopes which her second volume, Rose Brake, did not satisfy. There was no lack of metrical skill, or appreciation of nature and subtle moods, but there was lacking the deeper interpretation of life which poetry demands.

During the period of 1891 till 1904, she turned to writing garden articles, more than 200 of them, for Forest and Stream, Garden and Forest, Gardening, among other publications. After that, she devoted her time to writing works of early American history.

== Personal life ==
Dandridge created a "remarkable" garden at Rose Brake, assisted by African-American gardeners Tom and Charity Devonshire. Here, she spent time in her hammock. She had three children, but the death of two of them led her to be withdrawn. There was speculation that Dandridge's death at home in Shepherdstown, on June 3, 1914, was a suicide, though it was refuted by the family.

== Selected works ==
- Joy and Other Poems, 1888
- Rose Brake, 1890
- George Michael Bedinger: Kentucky Pioneer, 1909
- Historic Shepherdstown, 1910
- American prisoners of the Revolution, 1910
