= Morgan Grove Park =

- Morgan's Grove
- U.S. National Register of Historic Places
- U.S. Historic district
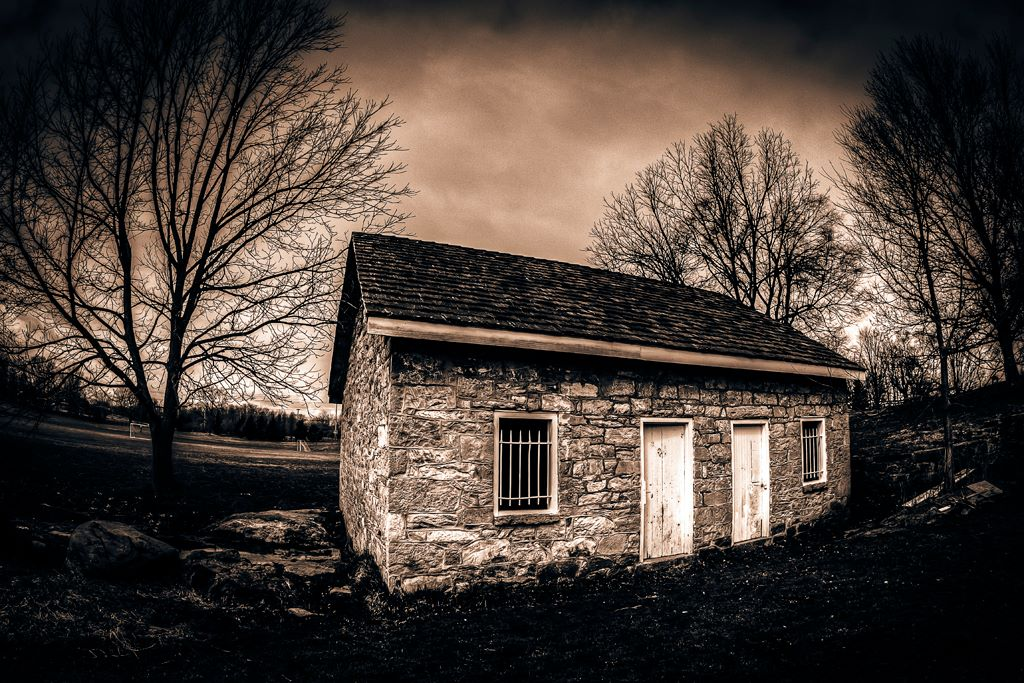
- Springhouse at Morgan's Grove Park

- Location within West Virginia Location within the United States
- Nearest city: Shepherdstown, West Virginia
- Coordinates: 39°25′4″N 77°48′45″W
- Built: 1775
- Architectural style: Georgian, Greek Revival
- NRHP reference No.: 99000286
- Added to NRHP: March 19, 1999

Morgan's Grove Siding 2005

Morgan's Grove Park is located in Shepherdstown, West Virginia, United States, and shares a history dating back to the 18th century and Morgan's Grove, from which the historic park got its name.

The park has a little over twenty acres of trees, meadows, a playground, and spring-fed stream. The park also has a 1500 square foot covered picnic pavilion with a full kitchen and restroom facilities, and is used to host family events and corporate functions. The main features of the park include playground equipment, soccer fields, sand volleyball, horseshoe pits, and a 3/4 mile walking or running trail.

== History ==
The park itself shares history that can be traced back to Morgan's Spring. The park goes back to July 16, 1775 when Captain Hugh Stephenson and his company began the famous "Bee Line March to Cambridge." This march lasted for roughly 24 days to meet up with George Washington's Continental Army that was roughly 600 miles away in Cambridge, Massachusetts. Morgan's Grove Park was the starting point of the historic journey, is currently listed in the National Register of Historic Places, and in 1989 was officially designated by the Secretary of the Army as the birthplace of the United States Army.

The picture of the Springhouse is the only remaining structure of Fountain Rock. This is not by coincidence; the Springhouse is the last remaining artifact of Alexander Boteler's family mansion, which was destroyed in 1864 by Union forces. Boteler was elected to the Confederate Congress and served as an aide to General Stonewall Jackson.

== Panhandle Earth Day Celebration ==
Annually, on the last Saturday of April, Morgan's Grove Park is the home of Panhandle's Earth Day Celebration. The celebration is just one of many events Morgan's Grove Park hosts and has been going strong since 2008.

== Sports ==
Although the site has a baseball field, the majority of the park is dedicated to its soccer fields for the multiple leagues that the field can support. The following youth soccer leagues play organized games on the soccer field:

- JCYSL - Jefferson County Youth Soccer League
- TCSC - Tri-County Soccer Club
- NCSL - National Capital Soccer League
