= Outline of sustainable agriculture =

Overview of and topical guide to sustainable agriculture

The following outline is provided as an overview of and topical guide to sustainable agriculture:

Sustainable agriculture – applied science that integrates three main goals, environmental health, economic profitability, and social and economic equity. These goals have been defined by various philosophies, policies, and practices, from the vision of farmers and consumers. Perspectives and approaches are very diverse. The following topics intend to help understand sustainable agriculture.

== Introduction ==
- Agroecology
- Alan Chadwick
- Biodynamic agriculture
- Ecoagriculture
- French intensive gardening
- Horticulture
- John D. Hamaker
- Lady Eve Balfour
- Organic farming
- Polyculture
- Resilience (ecology)
- Rudolf Steiner
- Sustainability

== Branches of sustainable agriculture ==
- Fisheries management – protecting fishery resources in an effort to maintain sustainable fisheries
- Sustainable farming
- Sustainable forest management
- Sustainable gardening

=== Sustainable farming ===
Sustainable farming

- Natural farming
- Masanobu Fukuoka

==== Perennial foods ====
- Achillea millefolium
- Asparagus
- Blitum bonus-henricus
- Breadfruit
- Cassava
- Crambe maritima
- Fruit
- Herb
- Nut (fruit)
- Olericulture
- Perennial vegetable
- Rhubarb
- Sacred herbs
- Shrub
- Sium sisarum
- Sorrel
- Taro

=== Sustainable forestry management ===
Sustainable forest management

- Coppicing
- Forest gardening
- Pollarding
- Short rotation coppice
- Woodland

=== Sustainable landscaping ===
Sustainable landscaping

- A Sand County Almanac
- Aldo Leopold
- Biodiversity
- Calvert Vaux
- Central Park
- Ecology
- Ecosystem
- Food miles
- Frederick Law Olmsted
- John Muir
- Land ethic
- Sierra Club
- Soil food web

== Approaches in sustainable agriculture ==
=== Hydroculture ===
Hydroculture

- Aeroponics
- Aquaponics
- Hydroponics

=== Integrated pest control ===
- Apiaceae
- Asteraceae
- Bee
- Beneficial insects
- Beneficial weed
- Biological pest control
- Bumblebee
- Chrysopidae
- Coccinellidae
- Companion planting
- Hoverfly
- Ichneumonoidea
- Insectary plant
- Integrated pest management
- List of beneficial weeds
- List of companion plants
- List of pest-repelling plants
- Pastured poultry
- Pollinator
- Rotational Grazing
- Soldier beetle
- Tachinidae
- Trap crop
- Trichogramma

=== Permaculture ===
Permaculture

- Berm
- Bill Mollison
- David Holmgren
- Holzer Permaculture
- Hügelkultur
- Keyline design
- P. A. Yeomans
- Sepp Holzer
- Swale (landform)

=== Regenerative agriculture ===
- Biointensive agriculture
- Booker T. Whatley
- J. I. Rodale
- The Rodale Institute

=== Sustainable development ===
- Agricultural economics
- Agronomy
- Community-supported agriculture
- Development economics
- Economic development
- Grameen Bank
- Microcredit
- Microfinance
- Muhammad Yunus
- Supply chain
- Value chain

== Economic considerations ==
- Action plan
- Cash flow
- Comparative advantage
- Competitive advantage
- Consumer behaviour
- Core competency
- Economies of scale
- Elasticity (economics)
- Enterprise life cycle
- Enterprise modelling
- Enterprise planning system
- Gross margin
- Land grabbing
- Micro-enterprise
- Opportunity cost
- Product differentiation
- Resource-based view
- Risk
- Risk management
- Social enterprise
- Socially optimal firm size
- Substitute good
- Supply and demand
- Uncertainty
- Water grabbing

== Farming and natural resources ==
- Water
  - Aquaculture
  - Aquaponics
  - Aqueduct
  - Aquifer
  - Brackish water
  - Dam
  - Drainage basin
  - Estuary
  - Hydrology
  - Lake
  - Mariculture
  - Reservoir
  - River
- Land
  - Soil
  - Soil life
  - Soil salination
  - Soil science
  - Terra preta
- Energy
  - Biogas
  - Biomass
- Air
  - Arctic climate
  - Climate
  - Climate change
  - Climate model
  - Climate of the Alps
  - Global climate change
  - Meteorology
  - Microclimate
  - Microclimate
  - Subarctic climate
  - Temperate climate
  - Wind
- Weather
  - Extreme weather
  - Meteorology
  - Monsoon
  - Precipitation
  - Rain
  - Severe weather
  - Subtropical cyclone
  - Weather forecasting
  - Wind
- Vegetation, Plant, animal, List of domesticated plants, List of vegetables, List of herbs, List of fruit, List of domesticated animals, Cereal
- Biodiversity
  - Allelopathy
  - Artificial selection
  - Commensalism
  - Ecological selection
  - Genetic erosion
  - Halotolerance
  - Heterosis
  - Kin selection
  - Natural selection
  - Protocooperation
  - Species
  - Trophic level
  - xerophyte

== Sustainable agricultural practices ==
- Genetic engineering
  - Bioinformatics
  - Biostatistics
  - Biotechnology
  - GIS
- Gardening
  - Garden (list)
    - Edible schoolyard
    - Indoor garden
    - Wild garden
  - Allotment (gardening)
  - Forest gardening
  - Grass
  - Organic gardening
  - Vegetable growing
    - List of vegetables
  - Water-wise gardening
- Herbicide
  - Biocide
  - Biological pest control
  - Insecticide
  - Integrated pest management
  - List of companion plants
  - Pesticide
  - Push–pull technology
- Sustainable farming
  - Aquaponics
  - Buffer zone
  - Cash crop
  - Chillcuring
  - Controlled burn
  - Crop rotation
  - Drip irrigation
  - Fertilizer
  - Good Agricultural Practices
  - Grass (or Lawn)
  - Grazing management
  - Green manure
  - Irrigation
  - Living mulch
  - Monoculture
  - Multiple cropping
  - Open pollination -Pollination management
  - Orchard
  - Polyculture
  - Primary succession
  - Raingauge
  - Relay cropping
  - Secondary succession
  - Shifting cultivation
  - Sowing
  - Tillage
  - Vermicomposting
- Wood
  - List of forests
  - Forestry
  - Coppicing
  - Deforestation
  - Driftwood
  - Logging
  - Pollarding
  - Reforestation
  - Wildfire
  - Woodland management

== Rural development ==
- Planning
  - Regional planning
  - Zoning
  - Green Belt
  - Hima
  - Rural community development
  - Landscape ecology
  - Land use

== Food and food transformation ==
- Food
  - Ethical eating
  - Genetically modified food
  - Organic food
  - Local food
  - Low carbon diet
- Food and agricultural policy
  - Biosafety
  - Chronic toxicity
  - Slow Food
  - Ark of taste
  - Food quality
- Industrial ecology
  - Heirloom plant

== Economic, social and political context ==
- Ecological Economics
- patrimony
  - Total quality management
- Biosecurity
- Trade
  - Safe trade
  - Equity
  - Smart growth
  - Life cycle assessment
  - Willingness-to-pay
  - Cost-effectiveness
  - Cost-benefit analysis
  - Full cost accounting
  - Utility
- Bioregional democracy
  - Top-down approach
- Environment
  - Environmental organization
  - Environmental movement
  - Environmentalism
  - Radical environmentalism
  - Environmental agreements
  - Environmental law
  - International environmental law
  - Environmental finance
  - Environmental economics
  - Green economist
  - Green economics
  - Ecology movement -
- Land ethic
- Theoretical ecology
  - Ecological
  - Ecological niche
  - Ecological selection

=== Individuals ===
- René Dumont
- Donella Meadows
- José Bové
- Masanobu Fukuoka
- Wes Jackson
- Bill Mollison
- Vandana Shiva
- Wendell Berry
- Willie Smits

== Conventions, protocols, panels and summits ==
- Agenda 21
- NATURA 2000
- Biosafety protocol - Montreal 2000
- Convention on Biological Diversity
- Convention on Fishing and Conservation of Living Resources of the High Seas
- Convention on International Trade in Endangered Species of Wild Fauna and Flora (CITES)
- International Treaty on Plant Genetic Resources for Food and Agriculture
- United Nations Convention on the Law of the Sea
- Convention on Wetlands of International Importance Especially As Waterfowl Habitat
- Earth Summit 2002 (World summit on Sustainable Development), Johannesburg 2002
- International Seabed Authority
- International Tropical Timber Agreement, 1983
- Kyoto Protocol
- Common Agricultural Policy (CAP)
- Oxfam

== Index ==
- Category: Sustainable agriculture

== See also ==
- Outline of agriculture
- Agrarianism
  - Agriculture
  - Arid-zone agriculture
  - Agricultural engineering
  - Agricultural science
  - Agricultural science basic topics
  - Agritourism
  - Agroecology
  - Allotment gardens
  - Aquaponics
  - Biodynamic agriculture
  - Biogeography
  - Collective farming
  - Ecology
  - Agricultural cooperative
  - Forest gardening
  - Intensive agriculture
  - Mariculture
  - Organic food
  - Organic farming
  - Organic gardening -Permaculture
  - Precision agriculture
  - Urban agriculture
  - Water-wise gardening
- Sustainability
  - Sustainable development
  - Sustainable consumption
  - Sustainable use
  - Productivism
- Value of life
  - Life-style choice
  - Allotment (gardening)
  - Green wall
  - Eco-village
  - Autonomous building
  - Subsistence farming
- Nature
  - Natural capitalism
  - Natural medicine
  - Natural order
  - Natural resource
  - Natural selection
  - Environment
  - Renewable resource
  - Dynamic equilibrium
- Culture
  - Cultural diversity
  - Cultural Resources Management
  - Ecotourism
  - Ecological Economics
- Palm sugar
- Arenga pinnata

Related lists

- Urban economics
- List of ecology topics
- List of environment topics
- List of ethics topics
- List of economics topics
- List of organic gardening and farming topics
