= Beneficial =

Beneficial may refer to:

== Organizations ==
- Beneficial Corporation, a consumer finance company founded in 1914 that was ultimately bought by HSBC Corporation
  - Beneficial Loan Society, the former name of Beneficial Corporation
  - Beneficial Finance, a former division of HSBC Finance, and a part of their acquisition of Beneficial Corporation
- Beneficial Bank, a full-service bank founded in 1853 operating in Pennsylvania and New Jersey
- Beneficial Financial Group, an insurance and financial services company founded in 1905 and run by The Church of Jesus Christ of Latter-day Saints
- Beneficial State Bank, a community development bank founded in 2007 that serves California and the Pacific Northwest

== Biology ==
- Beneficial organism, any organism that benefits the growing process of another species
  - Beneficial insect
  - Beneficial weed
- Beneficial Microbes, a scientific journal covering research on microbes beneficial to the health and well-being of humans and animals

== Law ==
- Beneficial interest
- Beneficial owner
- Beneficial ownership
- Beneficial use
