= Beneficial weed =

Invasive plant with positive effects

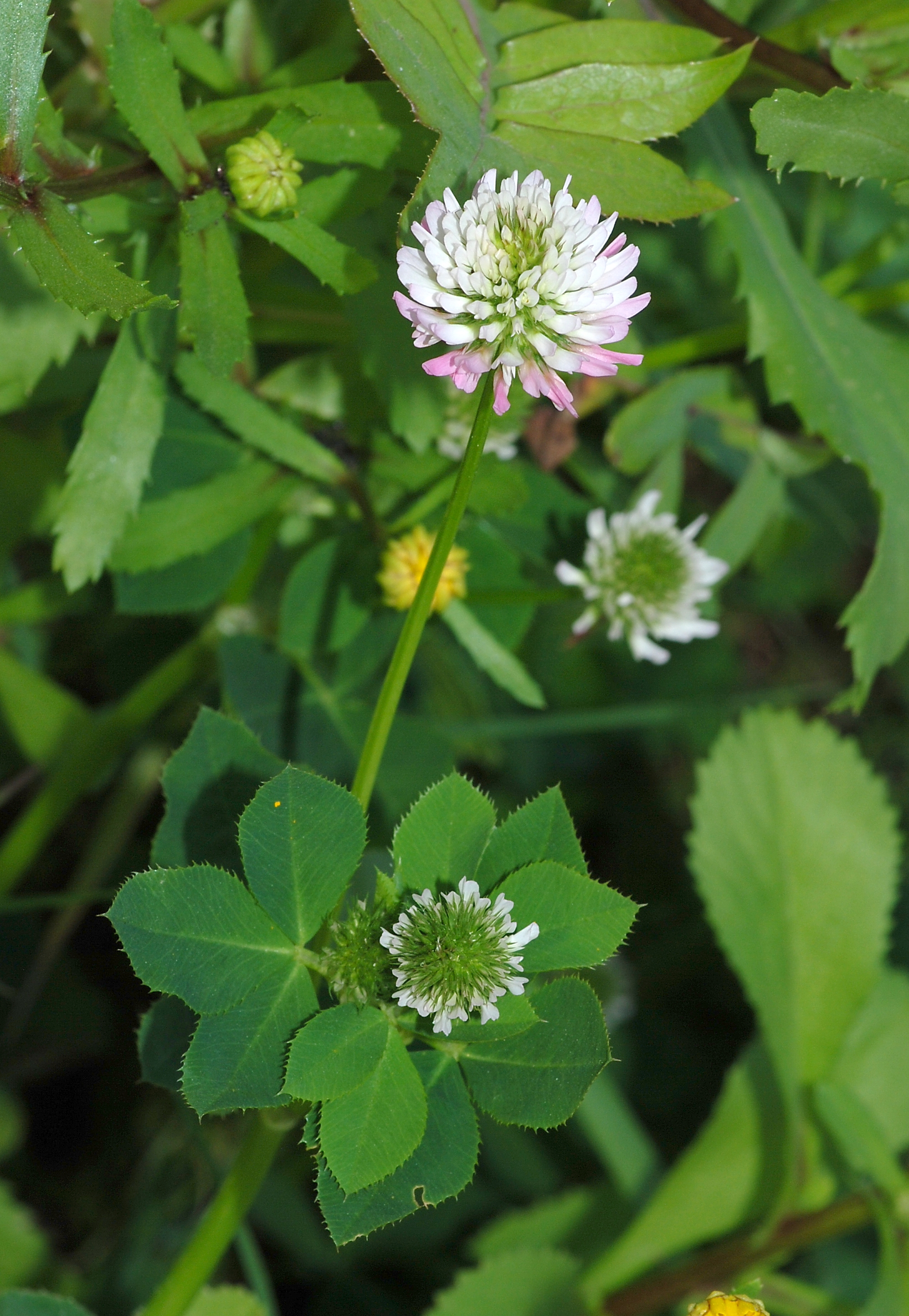
White clover is included in some grass seed mixes, because it is a legume that fixes soil nitrogen with help of mycorrhiza

A beneficial weed can be an invasive plant that has some companion plant effect, which is edible, contributes to soil health, adds ornamental value, or is beneficial in some way. These plants are normally not domesticated. However, some invasive plants, such as dandelions, are commercially cultivated in addition to growing in the wild. Beneficial weeds include many wildflowers, as well as other weeds that are commonly removed or poisoned. Certain weeds that have obnoxious and destructive qualities have been shown to fight illness and are thus used in medicine. Reductions in abundances of weeds which act as hosts may affect associated insects and other taxa which are beneficial. For example, Parthenium hysterophorus which is native to Northern Mexico and parts of the US, has been an issue for years due to its toxicity and ability to spread rapidly. In the past few decades though research has found that Parthenium hysterophorus has been used in traditional medicine to treat inflammation, pain, fever, neurological disorders and diseases like malaria and dysentery. It is also known to create Biogas and can be used as a bioremediation agent to break down heavy metals and other pollutants.

== Soil health ==
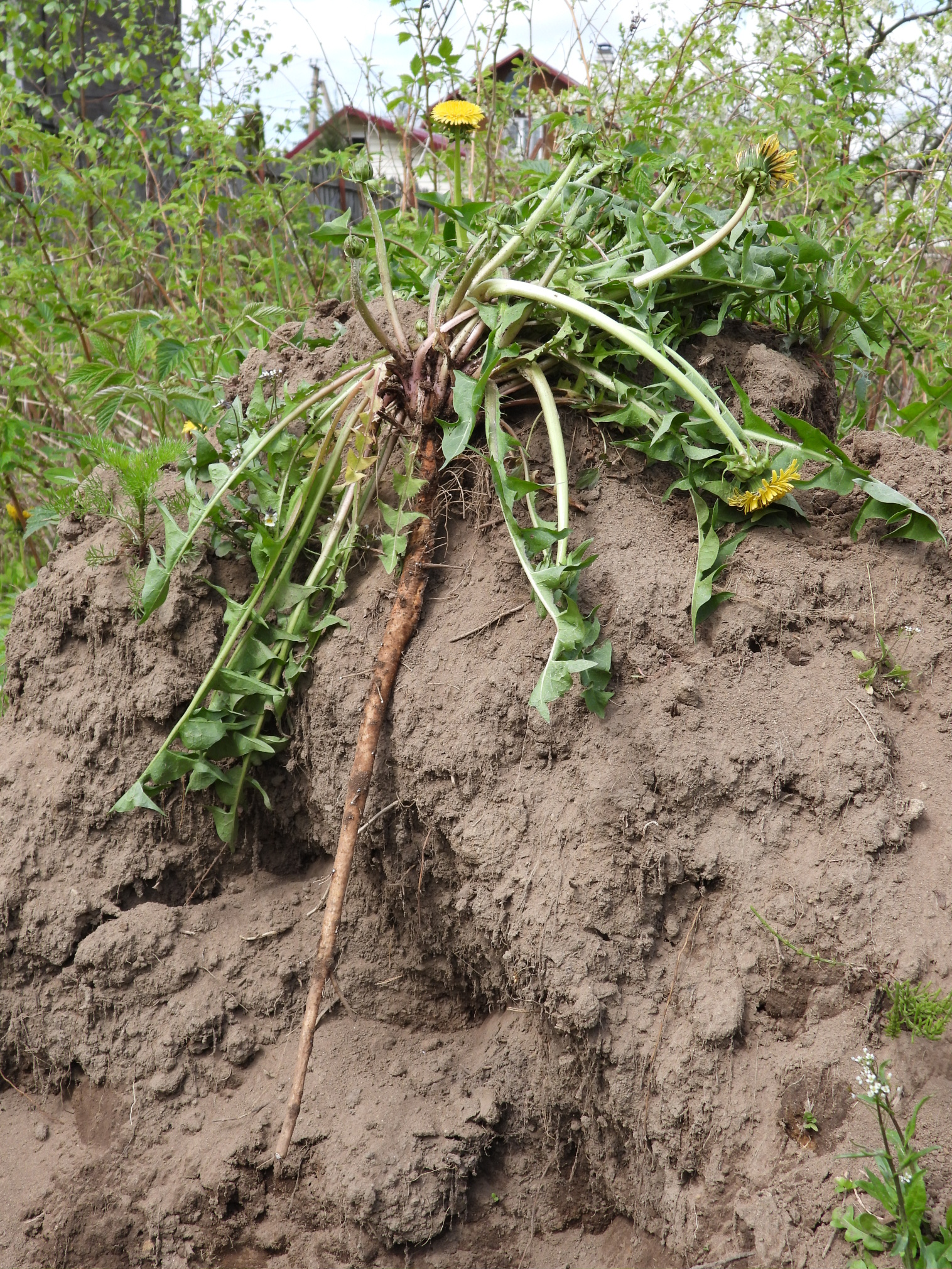
Dandelions, such as this common dandelion (Taraxacum officinale) benefit neighboring plant health by bringing up nutrients and moisture with their deep taproots.

Beneficial weeds are erroneously considered to compete with neighboring plants for food and moisture. However, some "weeds" provide the soil with nutrients, either directly or indirectly.

- For example, if they are colonized by certain bacteria (most commonly Rhizobium), legumes such as white clover add nitrogen to the soil through the process of nitrogen fixation. These bacteria have a symbiotic relationship with the roots of their host, fixing atmospheric nitrogen by combining it with oxygen or hydrogen to make the nitrogen available to the plant as NH_{4} or NO_{3}.
- Others use deep taproots to bring up nutrients and moisture from beyond the range of normal plants so that the soil improves in quality over generations of that plant's presence. Root-derived soil which is retained more stable soil aggregates than shoot-derived soil. Although roots normally contribute in generally 20% of the total plant weight, which is well-developed root system also essential for healthy plant growth and development.
- Weeds with strong, widespread roots also introduce organic matter to the soil in the form of those roots, turning hard, dense clay dirt into richer, more fertile soil.
- Some plants like tomatoes and maize will piggyback on nearby weeds, allowing their relatively weak root systems to grow deeper.

== Pest prevention ==
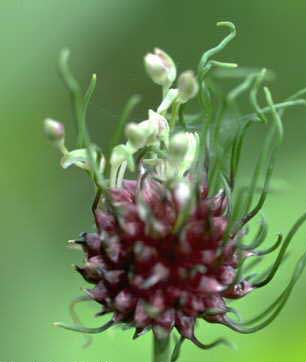
Crow garlic, like any Allium, masks scents from pest insects, protecting neighboring plants

Many weeds protect nearby plants from pest insects. Some beneficial weeds release volatile organic compounds that mask the scents of nearby plants, as with alliums and wormwood; others imitate the pheromones of pest insects and confuse them, as with ground ivy, oregano, and other mints. In addition, a number of beneficial weeds have spines or other features that deter pest insects.

=== Trap crops ===
Some weeds act as trap crops, distracting pests away from valued plants. Insects often search for target plants by smell, and then land at random on anything green in the area of the scent. If they land on an edible "weed", they will stay there instead of going on to the intended victim. Sometimes, they actively prefer the trap crop.

=== Host-finding disruption ===
The use of certain weeds integrated around native or otherwise intended plants has been found to be beneficial in many ways. A 2015 study showed that the presence of other plants or decoy plants made of green plastic, cardboard, or any other green materials can significantly reduce the success rate of flying pests in locating their host plants. These pests:

- Locate plants primarily by scent, and any "weed" that has a strong scent can mask the scent of the host plant and reduce the odds of the pest finding it. Examples of such plants include Crow Garlic and Ground Ivy, which have been found to effectively reduce infestations of Japanese beetles and caterpillars, respectively.
- Tend to avoid landing on bare earth and instead opt for the nearest green surface. Using "green mulch" or other types of greenery can also make it more difficult for pests to locate their target by making "inappropriate landings" on other plants.
- Have difficulty laying eggs on a crop in the presence of other greenery, for example flies take 2-5 times longer if they land on a non-host disruptor plant.

Some "weed" species, such as subterranean clover (Trifolium subterraneum L.), have been found to be specifically beneficial against pests targeting crops of common cabbage (Brassica) species, reducing insects by 39%-100% on brassica plants when they were sown surrounded with clover as compared to when surrounded by bare soil. The differences in the colonization of such insects appear sufficient to determine the lower numbers of insects found when host plants are surrounded and under sown with clover.

== Companion plants ==
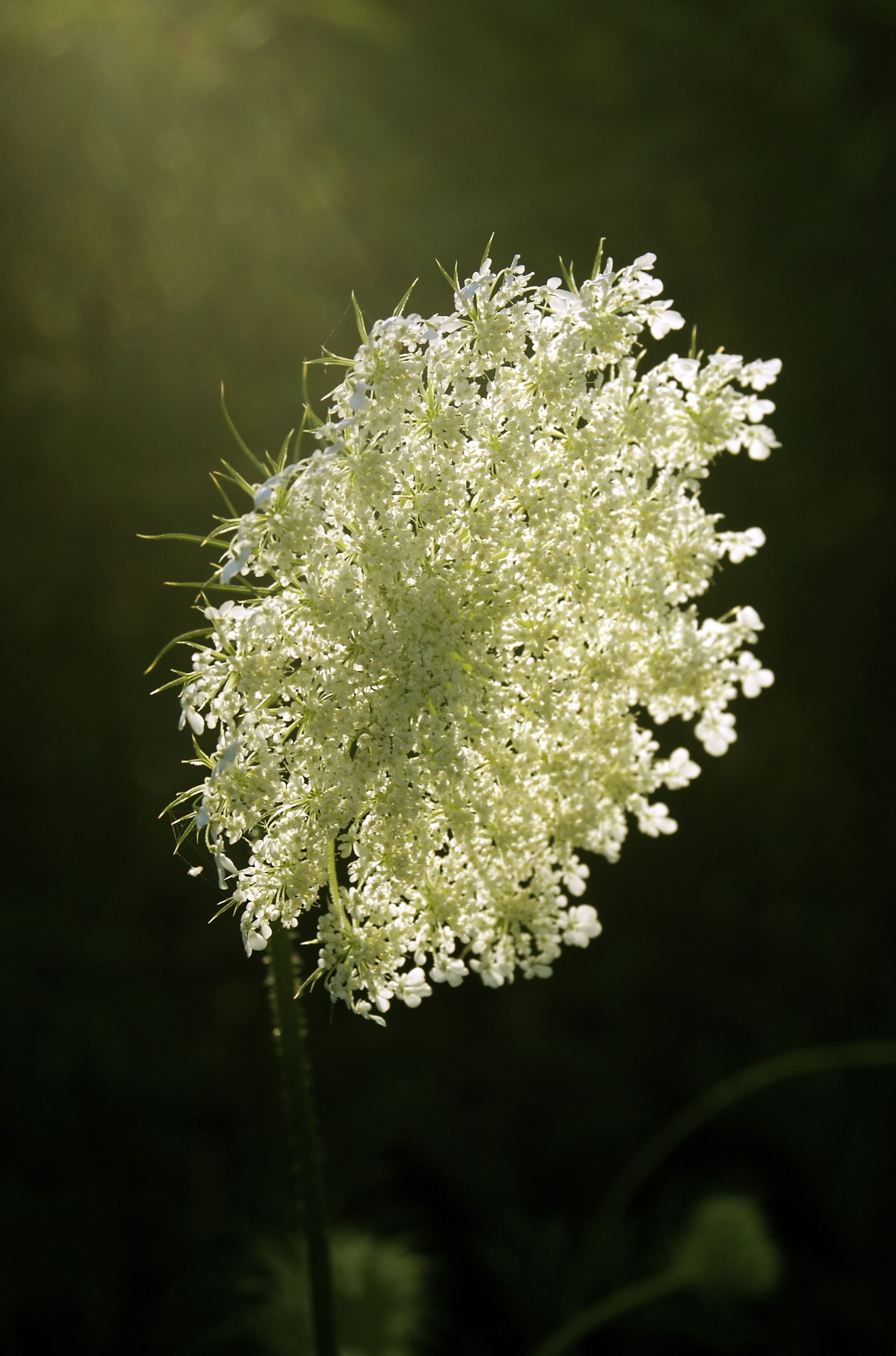
Queen Anne's lace provides shelter to nearby plants, as well as attracting predatory insects that eat pests such as caterpillars, and may boost the productivity of tomato plants.

Many plants can grow intercropped in the same space because they exist on different levels in the same area, providing ground cover or working as a trellis for each other. This healthier style of horticulture is called forest gardening. Larger plants provide a wind break or shelter from the noonday sun for more delicate plants.

=== Green mulch ===
Conversely, some intercropped plants provide a living mulch effect, able to inhibit the growth of harmful weeds and create a humid, cooler microclimate around nearby plants to stabilize soil moisture.

Plants such as ryegrass, red clover, and white clover are examples of "weeds" that are living mulches, often welcomed in horticulture.

== Herbicide ==
Plants or fungi can be repelled through a chemical means known as allelopathy. Certain plants can be affected by a chemical emission through their roots or air, slowing their growth, preventing seed germination, or even killing them.

== Beneficial insects ==
A common companion plant benefit from many weeds is to attract and provide habitat for beneficial insects or other organisms that benefit plants.

For example, wild umbellifers attract predatory wasps and flies. The adults eat nectar, but they feed common garden pests to their offspring.

Some weeds attract lady beetles or "good" types of nematodes, or provide ground cover for predatory beetles.

== Uses for humans ==
- Some beneficial weeds, such as lamb's quarters and purslane, are edible and highly nutritional. Dandelions, a widespread invasive weed, were introduced to North America originally because they were considered a staple source of food; they were admired for maturing quickly and spreading vastly.
- A number of weeds have been proposed as natural alternate sources for latex (rubber), including goldenrod, from which the tires were made on the car famously given by Henry Ford to Thomas Edison.
- Cocklebur and stinging nettle have been used for natural dyes and medicinal purposes.
- Some plants seem to subtly improve the flavor of other plants around them. For example, stinging nettle, besides being edible if properly cooked, seems to increase essential oil production in nearby herbs.

== Examples ==
- Clover, like other legumes, hosts bacteria that fix nitrogen in the soil. Its vining nature covers the ground, sheltering more moisture than it consumes, providing a humid, cooler microclimate for surrounding plants as a "green mulch". It also is preferred by rodents over many garden crops, reducing the loss of vegetable crops.
- Dandelions possess a deep, strong tap root that breaks up hard soil, benefiting weaker-rooted plants nearby and drawing up nutrients from deeper than shallower-rooted nearby plants can access. They will also excrete minerals and nitrogen through their roots, attract pollinators with their nectar, release ethylene that triggers nearby fruits to ripen, and serve as an important food source for insects and birds.
- Crow garlic, the wild chives found in sunny parts of a North American yard, has all of the companion plant benefits of other alliums, including repelling japanese beetles, aphids, and rodents, and is believed to benefit the flavor of solanums like tomatoes and peppers. It can be used as a substitute for garlic in cooking, though it may lend a bitter aftertaste.
- Daucus carota works as a nurse plant for nearby crops like lettuce, shading them from overly intense sunlight and keeping more humidity in the air. It attracts predatory wasps and flies that eat vegetable pests. It has a scientifically tested beneficial effect on nearby tomato plants. When it is young it has an edible root, revealing its relationship to the domesticated carrot.

== See also ==
- Beneficial organism
