= List of beneficial weeds =

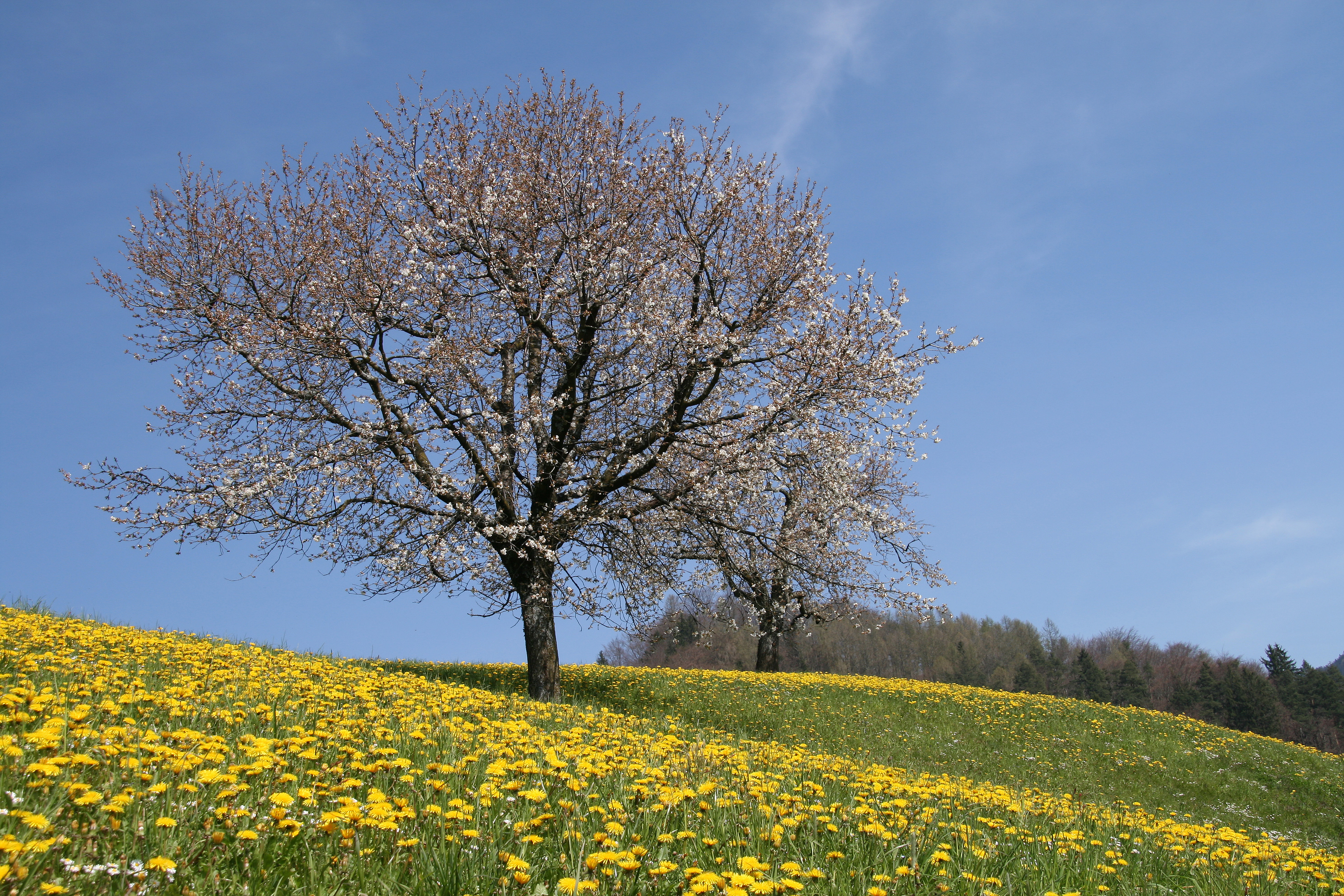
Dandelions (Taraxacum), a common beneficial weed

This is a list of undomesticated or feral plants, generally considered weeds, yet having some positive effects or uses, often being ideal as companion plants in gardens.

Beneficial weeds can accomplish a number of roles in the garden or yard, including fertilizing the soil, increasing moisture, acting as shelter or living mulch, repelling pests, attracting beneficial insects, or serving as food or other resources for human beings.

== Chart ==
Beneficial weed chart
| Common name | Scientific name | Companion plant for | Attracts/hosts | Repels | Traps | Edibility | Medicinal | Avoid | Comments |
|---|---|---|---|---|---|---|---|---|---|
| Bashful mimosa | Mimosa pudica | Ground cover for tomatoes, peppers | predatory beetles | | | | | | Used as a natural ground cover in agriculture |
| Caper spurge | Euphorbia lathyris | | | Moles | | | Used in French folk medicine as an emetic and purgative | | Many domesticated animals can eat it, although it is poisonous to humans. |
Primarily edible
| Nettle | Urtica dioica | Broccoli, tomato, valerian, mint, fennel | | | | Despite its "sting", young plant parts are edible, as is much of the plant when blanched or otherwise prepared. It can be used to make herbal tea | | | Also once grown as a crop for its fiber. Its juice was once used in the place of rennet in cheese-making. It was also a source of "green" for dye. It can still be used as a high-protein additive in animal feed, once dried. Nettles prefer soils rich in nutrients beneficial to other plants—particularly nitrogen and phosphorus—and thus can be useful indicators of soil quality. |
| Crow garlic | Allium vineale | fruit trees, nightshades (tomatoes, peppers, potatoes, etc.), brassicas (cabbage, broccoli, kohlrabi, etc.) carrots | | slugs, aphids, carrot fly, cabbage worms | | Can be used like conventional chives | | beans, peas, parsley | This is a wild cousin of onions and garlic |
| Wild mustard | Brassicaceae | Grape vine, radish, non-mustard brassica, including cabbage, cauliflower, broccoli | Ladybugs | | Traps various brassica pests, including aphids | Seeds and leaves are edible | | beets | Domesticated mustard is a hybrid of three different species of wild mustard, all of which are still used in some places for food. This is known as the Triangle of U. |
| Wild rose | Rosa | Strawberries, grapes, roses | | Rodents and deer | Traps Japanese beetles | Rose hips can be used in herbal teas | | | This includes the feral multiflora rose, brought to the US both for use as root stock for domesticated roses, and as a "natural fence" for livestock. In the mid 20th century miles of multiflora rose hedge were planted in sequence. |
Improves environment for nearby plants
| Borage | Borago officinalis | legumes, brassicas, tomatoes | Its flowers attract predatory wasps | | | crunchy leaves and flowers can be consumed in salads | Borage is one of the most widely touted traditional medicinal herbs in Europe. |
| Dandelion | Taraxacum | Any garden plant | Its flowers attract pollinators | | | all parts of the dandelion are edible in season | Used in traditional herbal medicine throughout the world. The common dandelion (Taraxacum officinale) contains chemicals that are known to have diuretic properties. | | Dandelions benefits nearby plants through their powerful tap root system. It breaks up hard soil, going deep into the ground, then brings up nutrients other plants could not reach. |
| Clover | Trifolium | brassicas like cabbage and broccoli | Its flowers attract pollinators | | | Leaves can be eaten | Used in traditional herbal medicine to "cleanse the blood" and contains micronutrients that may help with gout | Do not grow around tomato plants, clover is a legume that makes the soil too fertile. Tomato plants need a mild nitrogen deficit to set fruit | Clover, like most legumes, hosts bacteria that fix nitrogen in the soil, helping fertilize nearby plants. Clover also provides ground cover, helping retain water in the soil as a "living mulch", and protecting nearby crops from predation by insect pests. Bare earth gardening makes it easier for insects to home in on plants to destroy, the green of the clover prevents this. |

== Categories of beneficial weeds ==
=== Pest-repellent ===
- Neem—repels leaf eating insects

=== Edible ===
- Blackberry—blackberries are rich in nutrients, and their thorny stems can form a barrier against some larger pest mammals.
- Burdock—roots are edible (as are the stalks, but particularly the young leaves).
- Chickweed (Stellaria media)—used in salads and also as ground cover.
- Cornflower—various colors; can be served as edible garnish to decorate salads.
- Flatweed—leaves are edible raw, while roots are edible after being roasted.
- Horsetail—primeval plant that is high in silica; tops are very similar to and may be eaten like asparagus.
- Lamb's quarters—leaves and shoots, raw, also prevents erosion, also distracts leaf miners from nearby crops.
- Nettle—young leaves collected before flowering used as a tea or spinach substitute. Plants have use as compost material or for fibre.
- Purslane—prepared raw for salads or sautéed.
- Shepherd's purse—leaves are edible and often sautéed or blanched.
- Watercress—can be eaten raw or cooked; is considered a weed in some cultures (caution required when harvesting wild because of the risk of contracting potentially fatal liver fluke).

=== Habitat for beneficial insects ===
- Wild blackberry—attracts predatory insects, and produces berries.
- Motherwort—attracts bees.
- Joe-Pye weed—habitat for pollinators and predatory insects.
- Aster—habitat for predatory insects.

=== Shelter plants ===
- Normal grass can be used as ground cover, especially in nitrogenous soils.

=== Trap crops ===
Trap crops draw potential pests away from the actual crop intended for cultivation.

- Cowpea—attracts ladybird beetle, so planting around cotton fields protects them from sucking insects. It serves as source of food and niche.

== See also ==
- List of companion plants
- List of edible flowers
- List of pest-repelling plants

=== Organic approaches ===
- Organic farming
- Organic gardening

=== Indexes ===
- Category:Sustainable agriculture

== Bibliography ==
- Peterson, L.A. & Peterson, R.T. (1999). A Field Guide to Edible Wild Plants: Eastern and central North America. Houghton-Mifflin.
- Duke, J.A., Foster, S., & Peterson, R.T. (1999). A Field Guide to Medicinal Plants and Herbs of Eastern and Central North America. Houghton-Mifflin.
- Gibbon, E. (1988). Stalking the Wild Asparagus. Alan C. Hood & Company.
- Sharma, O.P., R.C. Lavekar, K.S. Murthy and S.N. Puri (2000). Habitat diversity and predatory insects in cotton IPM: A case study of Maharashtra cotton eco-system. Radcliffe's IPM world textbook. Minnesota University, USA.
