= Insectary plant =

Plant that attracts insects

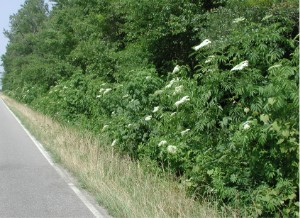
Elderberry in Bloom

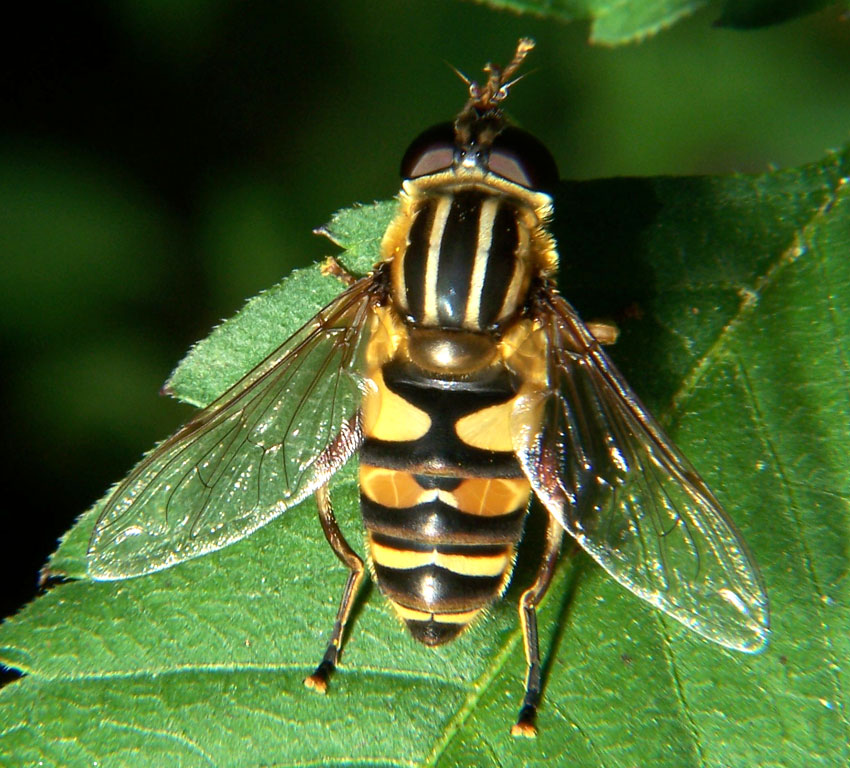
Hover Fly

Insectary plants are those that attract insects. As such, beneficial insectary plants are intentionally introduced into an ecosystem to increase pollen and nectar resources required by the natural enemies of the harmful or unwanted insects pests. Beyond an effective natural control of pests, the beneficial insects also assist in pollination.

The "friendly insects" include ladybeetles, bees, ground beetles, hoverflies, and parasitic wasps. Other animals that are frequently considered beneficial include lizards, spiders, toads, and hummingbirds. Beneficial insects are as much as ten times more abundant in the insectary planting area. Mortality of scale insects (caused by natural enemies) can be double with insectary plantings. In addition, a diversity of insectary plants can increase the population of beneficial insects such that these levels can be sustained even when the insectary plants are removed or die off.

For maximum benefit in the garden, insectary plants can be grown alongside desired garden plants that do not have this benefit. The insects attracted to the insectary plants will also help the other nearby garden plants.

Many members of the family Apiaceae (formerly known as Umbelliferae) are excellent insectary plants. Fennel, angelica, coriander (cilantro), dill, and wild carrot all provide in great number the tiny flowers required by parasitic wasps. Various clovers, yarrow, and rue also attract parasitic and predatory insects. Low-growing plants, such as thyme, rosemary, or mint, provide shelter for ground beetles and other beneficial insects. Composite flowers (daisy and chamomile) and mints (spearmint, peppermint, or catnip) will attract predatory wasps, hoverflies, and robber flies. The wasps will catch caterpillars and grubs to feed their young, while the predatory and parasitic flies attack many kinds of insects, including leaf hoppers and caterpillars.

Other insectary plants include: mustard plants such as Brassica juncea, Phacelia tanacetifolia, buckwheat (Fagopyrum esculentum), marigold (Tagetes patula), elderberry, Korean licorice mint (Agastache rugosa), blackberry, Convolvulus, Crataegus, Anthriscus sylvestris, Chrysanthemum segetum, Scrophularia, Rosa canina, Hedera helix, Centaurea cyanus, Eschscholzia californica, Prunus spinosa, Lobularia maritima.

== See also ==
- Biological pest control
- Companion planting
- Beneficial weed
- Insect hotel
