= List of companion plants =

This is a list of companion plants, traditionally planted together. Many more are in the list of beneficial weeds. Companion planting is thought by its practitioners to assist in the growth of one or both plants involved in the association. Possible mechanisms include attracting beneficial insects, repelling pests, or providing nutrients such as by fixing nitrogen, shade, or support. Companion plantings can be part of a biological pest control program. A large number of companion plant associations have been proposed; only a few of these have been subjected to scientific testing. Thus where a table column for example states "Helps" or "Helped by", this is to be read as meaning that traditional companion planting involves putting the named plants in that column into an association with the plant named at the left of the row, with the intention of causing the one plant to help or be helped by the other. Mechanisms that have been scientifically verified include using strongly aromatic plants to deter pests; using companions to hide crops from pests; providing plants as nurseries for beneficial insects including predators and parasitoids; trap cropping; and allelopathy, where a plant inhibits the growth of other species.

== For vegetables ==
Common name	Scientific name	Helps	Helped by	Attracts	-Repels/+distracts	Avoid	Comments
Alliums	Allium	Fruit trees, nightshades (tomatoes, capsicum peppers, potatoes), brassicas, carrots	Carrots, tomatoes, carrots and African spider plants (Cleome gynandra) together, marigolds (Tagetes spp.), mints	Thrips	slugs (see Garlic), -aphids, carrot fly, -cabbage loopers, -cabbage maggots, -cabbage worms, -Japanese beetles	Beans, peas	Allium is a genus of plants which includes onions and garlic.
Asparagus	Asparagus officinalis	Tomatoes, parsley	Aster family flowers, dill, coriander, tomatoes, parsley, basil, comfrey, marigolds, nasturtiums			Onion, garlic, potatoes	
Beans, bush	Phaseolus vulgaris	Cucumber, strawberries	Celery, strawberries, grains			soybeans, dry beans, alfalfa	"Lettuce, potato, tomato, other legumes, crucifers, or cucurbits increase sclerotinia" in the soil and should be avoided before and after snap beans. See the entry for "Legumes" for more info
Beans, pole	Phaseolus vulgaris		Radishes, Corn			brassicas, kohlrabi	the stalk of the corn provides a pole for the beans to grow on, which then gives nitrogen to the soil of the corn. Beans and corn are (with squash) traditional "Three Sisters" plants. As for Radishes, see the entry for "Legumes".
Beans, fava	Vicia faba		Strawberries, Celery				See the entry for "Legumes" for more info
Beets	Beta vulgaris	bush beans, cabbage, lettuce, kohlrabi, onions, brassicas, passion fruit	Bush beans, onions, kohlrabi, catnip, garlic, mint			Runner or pole beans	Good for adding minerals to the soil through composting leaves which have up to 25% magnesium. Runner or pole beans and beets stunt each other's growth.
Brassicas	Brassica	onions,	Beets, spinach, chard, Aromatic plants or plants with many blossoms, such as celery, chamomile, and marigolds. Dill, sage, peas, peppermint, spearmint, rosemary, rye-grass, garlic, onions and potatoes. geraniums, alliums, nasturtium, borage, hyssop, tomatoes, thyme, wormwood, southernwood, beans, clover		Wireworms	Mustards, nightshades (tomatoes, peppers, etc.), pole beans, strawberries	Brassicas are a family of plants which includes broccoli, Brussels sprouts, cabbage, cauliflower, Chinese cabbage, kohlrabi, radish, and turnip. Thyme, nasturtiums, and onion showed good resistance to cabbage worm, weevil and cabbage looper.
Broccoli	Brassica oleracea	Lettuce	Beets, dill, onions, tomato, turnip, clover				Broccoli as a main crop intercropped with lettuce was shown to be more profitable than either crop alone. Turnip acts as a trap crop. See brassicas entry for more info
Brussels sprouts	Brassica oleracea		Sage, thyme, clover,				
Cabbage	Brassica oleracea / Brassica chinensis	Beans, celery	Beans, clover, calendula/pot marigold, chamomile, larkspur, nasturtiums, dill, coriander, hyssop, onions, beets, mint, rosemary, sage, thyme,	Snails and slugs		Grapes	See brassicas entry for more info. If using clover as an intercrop it should be sown after cabbage transplant so as not to affect crop yield. Nasturtiums repel cabbage moths
Carrots	Daucus carota	Tomatoes, alliums, beans, leeks, lettuce, onions, passion fruit	Lettuce, alliums (chives, leeks, onions, shallots, etc.), rosemary, wormwood, sage, beans, flax	Assassin bug, lacewing, parasitic wasp, yellow jacket and other predatory wasps	Leek moth, onion fly	Dill, parsnip, radish	Tomatoes grow better with carrots, but may stunt the carrots' growth. Beans provide the nitrogen carrots need more than some other vegetables. Aromatic companion plants repel carrot fly. Alliums inter-planted with carrots confuse onion and carrot flies. For the beneficial insect-attracting properties of carrots to work, they need to be allowed to flower; Otherwise, use wild carrot, Queen Anne's Lace, for the same effect.
Cauliflower	Brassica oleracea	Beans, celery, spinach, peas	Mixture of Chinese cabbage, marigolds, rape, and sunflower. Spinach, peas				See brassicas for more info. See peas regarding their mutualism with cauliflower.
Celery	Apium graveolens	Bush beans, brassicas, cucumber	Cosmos, daisies, snapdragons, leeks, tomatoes, cauliflower, cabbage, bush beans		Whiteflies	Corn, aster flowers	Aster flowers, can transmit the aster yellows disease
Chard	Beta vulgaris ssp. cicla	Brassicas, passion fruit					
Corn / Maize	Zea mays	Beans, cucurbits, soybeans, tomatoes	Sunflowers, dill, legumes (beans, peas, soybeans etc.), peanuts, cucurbits, clover, amaranth, white geranium, pigweed, lamb's quarters, morning glory, parsley, and potato, field mustard,			Tomato, celery	Provides beans with a trellis, is protected from predators and dryness by cucurbits, in the three sisters technique
Cucumber	Cucumis sativus	Beans, kohlrabi, lettuce	Kohlrabi, nasturtiums, radishes, marigolds, sunflowers, peas, beans, chamomile, beets, carrots, dill, onions, garlic, amaranth (Amaranthus cruentus), celery, Malabar spinach	Beneficial for ground beetles	Raccoons, ants	Potato, aromatic herbs	Sow 2 or 3 radish seeds in with cucumbers to repel cucumber beetles. One study showed a 75% reduction in cucumber beetles with the concurrent seeding of amaranth. Various sprays from lettuce, asparagus, Malabar spinach, and celery were found to reduce whiteflies. See cucurbits entry for more info
Cucurbits	Cucurbitaceae	Corn	Corn, grain sorghum				Cucurbits are a family of plants that includes melons, cucumbers, gourds, pumpkins, and squash
Eggplant or Aubergine	Solanum melongena	Beans, peppers, tomatoes, passion fruit	Marigolds, catnip, redroot pigweed, green beans, tarragon, mints, thyme				Marigolds will deter nematodes.
Kohlrabi	Brassica oleracea v. gongylodes	Onion, beets, aromatic plants, cucumbers	Beets, cucumbers				See Brassicas entry for more info
Leek	Allium ampeloprasum v. porrum	Carrots, celery, onions, tomato, passion fruit	Carrots, clover,			Swiss chard	See Alliums entry for more info
Legumes	Phaseolus and Vicia	Beets, lettuce, okra, potato, cabbage, carrots, chards, eggplant, peas, tomatoes, brassicas, corn, cucumbers, grapes	Summer savory, beets, cucumbers, borage, cabbage, carrots, cauliflower, corn, larkspur, lovage, marigolds, mustards, radish, potato, peppermint, rosemary, lettuce, squash, lacy phacelia	Snails and slugs	Colorado potato beetle	Alliums, gladiolas	Hosts nitrogen-fixing bacteria, a good fertiliser for some plants, too much for others. Rosemary and peppermint extracts are used in organic sprays for beans. Summer savory and potatoes repel bean beetles.
Lettuce	Lactuca sativa	Beets, beans, okra, onions, radish, broccoli, Carrots, passion fruit	Radish, beets, dill, kohlrabi, onions, beans, carrots, cucumbers, strawberries, broccoli, thyme, nasturtiums, alyssum, cilantro	Slugs and snails.		Celery, cabbage, cress, parsley	Broccoli when intercropped with lettuce was shown to be more profitable than either crop alone.
Mustard	Sinapis alba	Beans, cabbage, cauliflower, fruit trees, grapes, radish, brussels sprouts, turnips			Various pests		See Brassicas entry.
Nightshades	Solanaceae		Carrots, alliums, mints (basil, oregano, etc.)			Beans, black walnuts, corn, fennel, dill, brassicas	Nightshades are a family of plants which include tomatoes, tobacco, chili peppers (including bell peppers), potatoes, eggplant, and others
Okra	Abelmoschus esculentus	Sweet potato, tomatoes, peppers	Beans, lettuce, squash, sweet potato, peppers				Okra and sweet potato are mutually beneficial when planted simultaneously.
Onion	Allium cepa	Beets, brassicas, cabbage, broccoli, carrots, lettuce, cucumbers, peppers, passion fruit, strawberries.	Carrots, beets, brassicas, dill, lettuce, strawberries, summer savory, chamomile, pansy			Lentils, peas, beans	See Alliums entry for more info
Parsnip	Pastinaca sativa	Fruit trees		A variety of predatory insects			The flowers of the parsnip plant left to seed will attract a variety of predatory insects to the garden, they are particularly helpful when left under fruit trees, the predators attacking codling moth and light brown apple moth.
Peas	Pisum sativum	Turnip, cauliflower, garlic,	Turnip, cauliflower, garlic, mints		Colorado potato beetle		Peas when intercropped with turnips, cauliflower, or garlic showed mutual suppression of growth however their profit per land area used was increased.
Peppers	Solanaceae, Capsicum	Okra	Beans, tomatoes, okra, geraniums, petunias, sunflowers, onions crimson clover, basil, field mustard			Beans, kale (cabbage, Brussels sprouts, etc.)	Pepper plants like high humidity, which can be helped along by planting with some kind of dense-leaf or ground-cover companion, like marjoram and basil; pepper plants grown together, or with tomatoes, can shelter the fruit from excess sunlight, and raise the humidity level. Sunflowers, when in bloom at the right time, shelter beneficial insects, lowering thrips populations.
Potato	Solanum tuberosum	Brassicas, beans, corn, peas, passion fruit	Horseradish, beans, dead nettle, marigolds, peas, onion, garlic, thyme, clover		Mexican bean beetle	Atriplex, carrot, cucumber, pumpkin, raspberries, squash, sunflower, tomato	Horseradish increases the disease resistance of potatoes. It repels the potato bug. Garlic is more effective than fungicides on late potato blight. Peas were shown to reduce the density of Colorado potato beetles.
Pumpkin	Cucurbita pepo	Corn, (in trad. Three Sisters partnership) beans	Buckwheat, Jimson weed, catnip, oregano, tansy, radishes, nasturtiums	spiders, ground beetles		Potatoes	Radishes can be used as a trap crop against flea beetles, cucurbita can be used in the Three Sisters technique. Nasturtiums repel squash bugs.
Radish	Raphanus sativus	Squash eggplant, cucumber, lettuce, peas, beans, pole beans,	Chervil, lettuce, nasturtiums		flea beetles, cucumber beetles	Grapes	Radishes can be used as a trap crop against flea beetles. Radishes grown with lettuce taste better.
Soybean	Glycine max		Corn, sunflower				A mixture of corn, mungbean, and sunflower was found to rid soybeans of aphids.
Spinach	Spinacia oleracea	Brassicas, passion fruit	Strawberries, peas, beans				The peas and beans provide natural shade for the spinach. See cauliflower notes regarding mutualism with spinach.
Squash	Cucurbita spp.	corn, beans, okra,	Beans, buckwheat, borage, catnip, tansy, radishes, marigolds, nasturtiums	Spiders, ground beetles			Radishes can be used as a trap crop against flea beetles, cucurbita can be used in the three sisters technique. Marigolds and nasturtiums repel squash bugs. Marigolds repel cucumber beetles.
Sweet potato	Ipomoea batatas	Okra	Okra				Okra and sweet potato are mutually beneficial when planted simultaneously.
Tomatoes	Solanum lycopersicum	Celery, roses, peppers, asparagus	Asparagus, basil, beans, bee balm (Monarda), oregano, parsley, marigold, alliums, garlic, leeks, celery, geraniums, petunias, nasturtium, borage, coriander, chives, corn, dill, mustard, fenugreek, barley, carrots, eggplant, marigold, mints, okra, sage, thyme, "flower strips", cucumbers, squash		Asparagus beetle	Black walnut, alfalfa, corn, fennel, chili peppers, peas, dill, potatoes, beetroot, brassicas, rosemary	Black walnuts inhibit tomato growth, in fact they are negative allelopathic to all other nightshade plants (chili pepper, potato, tobacco, petunia) as well, because it produces a chemical called juglone. Dill attracts tomato hornworm. Growing tomatoes with Basil does not appear to enhance tomato flavour but studies have shown that growing them around 10 inches apart can increase the yield of tomatoes by about 20%. One study shows that growing chili peppers near tomatoes in greenhouses increases tomato whitefly on the tomatoes. Cucumbers and squash can be used as living mulch, or green mulch, around tomato plants. The large leaves of these vining plants can help with soil moisture retention.
Turnips and rutabagas	Brassica rapa and Brassica napobrassica	Peas, broccoli	Hairy vetch, peas			hedge mustard, knotweed	Turnips act as a trap crop for broccoli. See peas regarding their mutualism with turnips.

== For fruit ==
Common name	Scientific name	Helps	Helped by	Attracts	-Repels/+distracts	Avoid	Comments
Apple	Malus domestica		Clover, chives, garlic, leeks, nasturtium, southernwood, daffodils, comfrey			Cedar because of apple-cedar rust. Walnut because its roots produce growth inhibitors that apple trees are sensitive to	French marigold inhibits codling moth but also its insect enemies, and fails to reduce damage to apples.
Apricot	Prunus armeniaca					Peppers	A fungus that peppers are prone to can infect apricot trees causing a lot of harm.
Blueberries	Vaccinium spp.		Oak trees, pine trees, strawberries, clover, bay laurel, dewberries, yarrow			tomatoes	Pine and oak trees create the acidic soil blueberries need. Strawberries and dewberries create healthy ground cover, clover fixes nitrogen for the blueberries' high needs, yarrow and bay laurel repel unhealthy insects. Each of the herbal companions listed also like the acidic soil the blueberry plant needs.
Fruit trees	Various		Alliums, tansy, nasturtiums, marigolds, marjoram, lemon balm, mustards, dandelions, borage				
Grapes	Vitis spp.		Hyssop, basil, beans, chives, geraniums, mustards, oregano, clover, peas, blackberries			Cabbage, garlic, radishes	
Melon	Cucumis melo		Chamomile, pigweed, summer savoury, sow thistle				
Passion fruit	Passiflora edulis		Potatoes, beets, Swiss chard, carrots, spinach, strawberries, eggplants, onions, leeks, lettuce			Cucurbits, maize, cowpea, sorghum, okra, sweet potatoes	
Pears	Pyrus spp.		"Aromatic plants"				
Strawberries	Fragaria × ananassa	Bush beans, lettuce, onions, spinach, passion fruit	Caraway, bush beans, lupin, onions, sage, thyme, borage	Slugs and snails.		Brassicas, Verticillium-susceptible species (tomatoes, potatoes, eggplant, peppers, melons, okra, mint, bush or bramble fruits, stone fruits, chrysanthemums, roses)	Thyme planted and/or placed next to each other help grow more strawberries quickly.

== For herbs ==
Common name	Scientific name	Helps	Helped by	Attracts	-Repels/+distracts	Avoid	Comments
Anise	Pimpinella anisum		Coriander	Bees, butterflies and hummingbirds			Not to be confused with star anise which is an entirely different species.
Basil	Ocimum basilicum	Tomato, peppers, oregano, asparagus, petunias, grapes	Chamomile, anise	Slugs and snails. butterflies	asparagus beetle, hornworms, mosquitoes, thrips and flies	Common rue, thyme	Is said to make tomatoes taste better, chamomile and anise are supposed to increase the essential oils in many herbs like basil
Borage	Borago officinalis	Almost everything, especially beans, strawberry, cucurbits (cucumber, squash), fruit trees, tomatoes and cabbage		Predatory insects, honeybees	Many pests, tomato worm		Predict a square metre for its adult size. Borage is a good companion for a wide variety of plants.
Caraway	Carum carvi	Strawberries		Parasitic wasps, parasitic flies		Dill	
Catnip	Nepeta cataria	Eggplant			Flea beetles, ants, aphids		
Chamomile	Matricaria recutita	Most herbs, brassicas, cucumber, wheat, onion, cabbage		Hoverflies, wasps			Growing near herbs will increase their oil production.
Chervil	Anthriscus cerefolium	Radish, lettuce, broccoli			Aphids	Radish	Loves shade, fortunately it grows well with shade-tolerant food plants; will make radishes grown near it taste spicier
Chives	Allium schoenoprasum	Apples, carrots, grapes, roses, tomatoes, brassica (broccoli, cabbage, mustard, etc.), many others	Carrots		Cabbage worms, carrot fly, aphids, mites, nematodes	Beans, peas	Same companion traits as all alliums (onions, garlic, shallots, leeks, etc.)said to prevent apple scab after 3 years planting at base of apple trees
Cilantro / Coriander	Coriandrum sativum	Anise cabbage, spinach, lettuce, tomato	Beans, peas	Tachinid fly, hoverflies	Aphids, spider mites, white flies and potato beetle		Attracts hoverflies which may in turn reduce pest populations in cabbages.
Dill	Anethum graveolens	Brassicas, cabbage, corn, fennel, lettuce, onions, cucumbers	Fennel	Tiger swallowtail butterflies/caterpillars, hoverflies, wasps, ladybugs, tomato hornworm, honeybees, ichneumonid wasps	Aphids, spider mites, squash bugs, cabbage looper	Carrots	One of the few plants said to grow with fennel: See fennel for info about intercropping.
Fennel	Foeniculum vulgare	Dill	Dill	Ladybugs, syrphid fly, tachinid fly	Aphids		Fennel is allelopathic to most garden plants, inhibiting growth, causing to bolt, or actually killing many plants. When growing together a higher ratio of fennel to dill provides the highest profit. Dill has a stabilizing effect on the fennel seed. Because it attracts syrphidae it reduces aphids through predation.
Flax	Linum usitatissimum	Carrots and potatoes			Colorado potato beetle		Flax contains tannin and linseed oils which may offend the Colorado potato bug
Garlic	Allium sativum	Vetch, brassicas, beets, roses, tomatoes, cucumbers, lettuce, celery, peas, potatoes	Tarragon, peas		Aphids, Japanese beetles, mites, cabbage looper, ants, cabbage maggot, fruit borers, red spider mites, slugs	Grapes	See Alliums entry for more info. Peas and garlic when planted closely together suppress each other's growth; however the profit over land area used is higher. Tarragon makes garlic grow rapidly.
Hyssop	Hyssopus officinalis	Brassicas, cabbage, grapes		Honeybees, butterflies, bees	Cabbage moth larvae, cabbage butterflies	Radishes	Stimulates growth of grapes.
Lavender	Lavandula angustifolia, L. dentata, L. stoechas	Chamomile, lettuce, brassicas, onions, tomatoes, oregano, thyme, marjoram, sage, rosemary, basil, lemon balm, squash		butterflies, hummingbirds, bees			
Lemon grass	Cymbopogon citratus	Eggplant			Cutworms		Reduces cutworms in eggplant in laboratory trials
Lovage	Levisticum officinale	Beans		Ichneumonid wasps, ground beetles (good)		Rhubarb	Is thought to improve the health of almost all plants, like borage and geraniums, is considered a "magic bullet" of companion planting
Oregano	Origanum vulgare	Grapes, tomatoes, peppers, pumpkin, many other plants	Basil	Hoverflies/Syrphidae	Aphids		Provides ground cover and much-needed humidity for pepper plants if allowed to spread among them. Because it attracts syrphidae, it reduces aphids through predation.
Parsley	Petroselinum crispum	Asparagus, corn/maize, tomatoes	Apple, asparagus, rose	Swallowtail butterflies, wasps, flies		Alliums, lettuce	Sacrificially attracts insects that feed on tomatoes
Peppermint	Mentha piperita	Alliums, brassicas, cabbage, peas, tomatoes			Cabbage root fly, ants, cabbage looper, aphids, onion fly		Repels cabbage flies, has same general companion properties as other mints
Rosemary	Rosmarinus officinalis	Cabbage, beans, brassicas, carrots, thyme			Bean beetle		Deters cabbage flies, repels many bean parasites
Sage	Salvia officinalis	Brassicas, rosemary, cabbage, beans, Brussels sprouts, carrots, strawberry, tomato, marjoram		Honeybees, cabbage butterfly	Cabbage flies, carrot fly, black flea beetle, cabbage looper, cabbage maggot, repels many bean parasites	Avoid any member of the allium family and common rue	
Southernwood	Artemisia abrotanum	Brassicas, fruit trees					Controls cabbage moths and malaria mosquitoes.
Spearmint	Mentha spicata	Alliums, brassicas, cabbage, peas, tomatoes			Ants, aphids, onion fly, cabbage root fly		Controls ants and aphids.
Stinging nettle	Urtica dioica	Chamomille, mint, broccoli, tomatoes, valerian, angelica archangelica, marjoram, sage & peppermint			Aphids		
Summer savoury	Satureja hortensis	Beans, melon, onions					Also delays germination of certain foul herbs
Tarragon	Artemisia dracunculus	Most vegetables, but especially eggplant					Its scent is disliked by most pests, and this plant is also thought to have Nurse Plant properties, enhancing the growth and flavor of crops grown with it.
Thyme	Thymus vulgaris	Brassicas, cabbage, eggplant/aubergine, potato, strawberry, tomato, Brussels sprouts		Hoverflies/Syrphidae	Cabbage worm, cabbage weevil, cabbage looper, aphids,		Because it attracts Syrphidae, it reduces aphids through predation.
Wormwood	Artemisia absinthium	Brassicas, carrots			Ants		Wormwood should be used with caution around most vegetables since it contains toxins.
Yarrow	Achillea millefolium	Many plants, "Most aromatic plants."		Predatory wasps, ladybugs, hoverflies, damselbugs	Aphids		May increase the essential oil production of some herbs. Also improves soil quality, use the leaves to enrich compost, or as mulch. Because it attracts syrphidae it reduces aphids through predation.

== For flowers ==
Common name	Scientific name	Helps	Helped by	Attracts	-Repels/+distracts	Avoid	Comments
Alyssum	Lobularia maritima	Lettuce		Syrphidae and most beneficial insects	Aphids		Because they attract syrphidae they help reduce aphids through predation.
Baby's breath	Gypsophila paniculata			Syrphidae	Aphids		Because they attract Syrphidae, they help reduce aphids through predation.
Bee balm	Monarda spp.	Tomato		Bees			
Californian poppy	Eschscholzia californica			Syrphidae	Aphids		Because they attract Syrphidae, they help reduce aphids through predation.
Dianthus	Dianthus caryophyllus	Roses, lavender, echinacea, aster, foxglove			Slugs		
Geraniums	Pelargonium spp.	Roses, corn, peppers, grapes			Leafhoppers, Japanese beetles	Tomatoes, tobacco, eggplants and other nightshades	A trap crop, attracting pests away from roses and grape vines, distracts beet leafhoppers, carrier of the curly top virus, keep away from solanaceous plants like eggplant, and tobacco
Larkspur	Delphinium spp.	Beans, cabbage					
Lupin	Lupinus	Cucurbits, brassica, lettuce, rosemary, dill, strawberry, rose	Summer savory, rose	Honeybees		Tomatoes and other solanaceae	This wildflower is a legume, hosting bacteria that fixes nitrogen in the soil, fertilizing it for neighboring plants. Same with marigold, planting nearby roses causes them to grow vigorously.
Marigold	Tagetes patula, T. erecta, T. minuta	Most plants, especially tomatoes and peppers, cucurbits (cucumbers, gourds, squash, potatoes, roses, alliums, brassicas, zucchini	Rose	Snails and slugs.	Root-knot nematodes, beet leaf hoppers, cucumber beetle, squash bug, onion fly, cabbage root fly		Marigolds are a wonder-drug of the companion plant world, invoking the saying "plant them everywhere in your garden". French marigolds (T. patula) produce a pesticidal chemical from their roots, so strong it lasts years after they are gone. Mexican marigolds (T. erecta) do the same, but are so strong they will inhibit the growth of some more tender herbs. Stinking Roger (T. minuta) has also been found effective against certain perennial weeds. Same with lupin, planting nearby roses causes them to grow vigorously.
Nasturtium	Tropaeolum majus	Beans, squash, tomatoes, fruit trees, brassicas, radish cucumbers		Predatory insects	Aphids, asparagus beetle, cabbage looper, cabbage worm, carrot fly, cabbage weevil, Colorado potato beetle squash bug, Japanese beetle, Mexican bean beetle, striped pumpkin beetles, whitefly, cucumber beetles flea beetle	Cauliflower	Trap crops for aphids, is among the best at attracting predatory insects, deters many pests of cucurbits
Pansy	Viola x wittrockiana	Alliums, onions, roses	Roses		Bees, butterflies, ants	Ants (with aphids), snails, slugs, white butterfly	A good and nice-smelling flower that really attracts ants. It is like the viola plant, but has two or three colors in flowers. Helps alliums and onions, which repels the white butterfly.
Petunia	Petunia x hybrida	Cucurbits (squash, pumpkins, cucumbers), asparagus			Leafhoppers, Japanese beetles, aphids, asparagus beetle		Is a trap crop almost identical to geraniums in function
Phacelia	Phacelia tanacetifolia	Plants which are prone to aphids, especially lettuce, tomato, rose		hoverfly			This plant attracts hoverflies and is good around plants which are prone to aphids.
Rose	Rosa spp.		Chives, garlic, marigolds				
Sunflower	Helianthus annuus	Peppers, corn, cucumber, soybeans, tomatoes, swan plant	Swan plant		Aphids	Pole beans	Was grown as a companion for corn (maize) before modern Europeans arrived in the Americas, supposedly increases their production, ants herd aphids onto sunflowers, keeping them off neighboring plants. Works as a trap plant for thrips keeping them off of bell peppers. Planting near swan plants help sunflowers grow rapidly.
Swan plant	Gomphocarpus physocarpus, Asclepias physocarpa, milkweed	Sunflower	Sunflower, basil	Monarch butterfly	Aphids	Plants that attracts aphids and spider mites	Attracts the monarch butterfly during spring and summer. Basil repels pests that attracts by the swan plant like aphids.
Sweet pea	Lathyrus odoratus	Sweet alyssum, lobelia, roses, lavender, catmint	Brassica, spinach, silverbeet and salads	Bees, butterflies		Aphids	An annual climbing plant, which is like the edible pea. Makes a good decoration in your garden or fence.
Tansy	Tanacetum vulgare	Beans, cucurbits (cucumbers, squash, etc.), raspberries and relatives, roses, corn, fruit trees		Ladybugs, honeybees	flying insects (Ichneumonid wasps), ants, Japanese beetles, cabbage butterfly, cabbage maggot, asparagus beetle, carrot fly, striped cucumber beetles, Colorado potato beetle, cutworm, flea beetle, flies, imported cabbageworm, squash bugs		Toxic to people and many animals; do not plant it where livestock browse. Is reputed to repel herbivorous insects.
Zinnia	Zinnia	Beans, tomatoes, peppers			Whiteflies		Attracts hummingbirds that eat whiteflies, attracts pollinators

== Other ==
Common name	Scientific name	Helps	Helped by	Attracts	-Repels/+distracts	Avoid	Comments
Alfalfa	Medicago sativa	Cotton		Assassin bug, big-eyed bug, ladybug, parasitic wasps	Lygus bugs	Tomatoes, fava beans	Used by farmers to reduce cotton pests, a good crop to improve soil; fixes nitrogen. Alfalfa has some allelopathic effects to tomato seedlings.
Peanut	Arachis hypogaea	Beans, corn, cucumber, eggplant, lettuce, marigold, melon and sunflower					Peanuts encourage growth of corn and squash
Walnut tree	Juglans spp.	Many types of grass including Kentucky bluegrass (Poa pratensis).	European alder (sacrifice plant), hairy vetch, crownvetch, sericea lespedeza			Apple trees, grasses	Black walnut is harmful to the growth of all nightshade plants, including Datura or Jimson weed, eggplant, mandrake, deadly nightshade or belladonna, capsicum (paprika, chile pepper), potato, tomato, and petunia.

== See also ==
- Push–pull agricultural pest management
- Sustainable agriculture
- Sustainable landscaping
- Sustainable gardening
