= Jim Cochran =

American farmer from California

- Born: 1947 (age 77–78); Carlsbad, California
- Occupation: Farmer
- Known for: Organic farming.

Jim Cochran is an organic strawberry farmer, who was the first person to grow strawberries organically on a commercial scale in California.

== Early life ==
Cochran was born in Carlsbad, California in 1947.

== Education ==
Cochran studied child development and European intellectual history at the University of California, Santa Cruz in the late 1960s, where he became interested in alternative farming methods.

== Career ==
Cochran began his commercial farming career growing strawberries using conventional methods, but switched to organic farming methods after he was nearly poisoned by pesticides and, as a result of this experience, questioned the effect that the chemicals had on his workers.

In 1983, he started Swanton Berry Farm, located North of Santa Cruz, California, in Davenport, California. In 1987, his farm became the first CCOF-certified organic strawberry farm in the State of California. He subsequently developed a wide range of new methods, which include crop rotations, such as broccoli and brussels sprouts, trap crops such as mustard and alfalfa, and the use of natural predators, to control strawberry specific pests and diseases. His mostly intuitively developed methods were later verified scientifically in a series of studies by University of California, Davis plant pathologist Krishna Subbarao and his collaborators.

Cochran originally found it difficult to get funding for his experiments from the California Strawberry Commission, stating that "The industry blockaded our efforts to get money to research alternatives, and spent a lot of money in Washington making sure our proposals didn't get funded." Cochran's methods have been credited for making a large-scale commercial organic strawberry industry possible in California. Cochran was also the first, and still one of the few, California organic farmers to have a contract with the United Farm Workers.
