= Chaos gardening =

Gardening practice

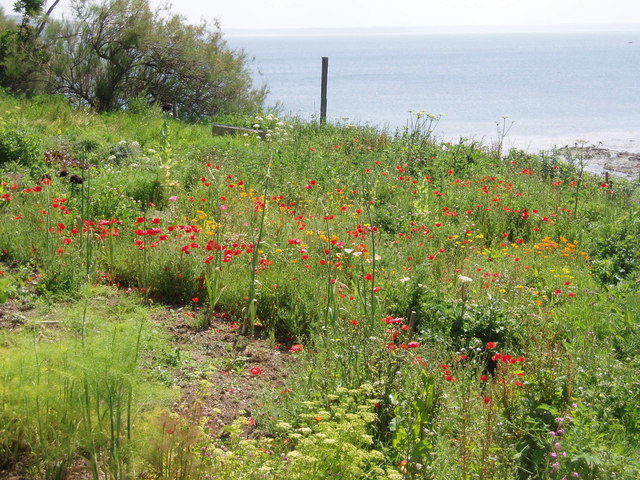
A cottage garden in the Prussia Cove nature reserve. Chaos gardening may produce such a style of planting.

Chaos gardening is a gardening practice of purposeful disorganization in gardening for a wildflower-like appearance. The practice involves gathering unused plants and seeds, scattering them randomly in the allotted garden space, and leave it up to chance as to which seeds or plants end up growing. The plants and seeds can be a variety of flowers, herbs, fruits, vegetables, and grasses. The random plants that do grow is said to result in a natural-looking garden with variety.

The practice is described by Better Homes and Gardens magazine as laissez-faire that is "a haphazard and laid-back approach to gardening", where it is the expectation that some plants will thrive and some will not. Homes & Gardens describes it as "perfect for gardening amateurs", and the HGTV characterises it as a "freeing" approach.

This gardening trend was popularised on social media in 2024.

== Benefits ==
Some benefits from practicing chaos gardening are:

- Low maintenance gardening
- Less planning
- Create the effect of a wild, natural cottage garden
- Potentially more enchanting aesthetic compared to overly structured flower beds
- Improved biodiversity and resilience

== Drawbacks ==
Some drawbacks and challenges from chaos gardening are:

- Doesn't eliminate maintenance
- Some seeds will be wasted due to environment mismatches to productive growth
- Watering is complicated due to varying watering needs of the garden
- Fertilizing is complicated similarly due to different nutritional needs
- Potential overcrowding
- Unpredictability of the garden's development
- Increased chance of weeds growing

== Considerations ==
Although typical gardening techniques and rules are not followed when practicing chaos gardening, there are some considerations:

1. A sunny location to cater to most flowers and plants
2. Rich, well-draining soil to have plants survive
3. Lean towards native plants
4. Initial upfront maintenance before lowering to more minimal maintenance
5. Follow local garden and homeowner association (HOAs) regulations

== Comparisons ==
Chaos gardening is similar to other less traditional gardening techniques, like guerilla gardening and cottage gardening, but is still unique. Although guerilla gardening and chaos gardening share the technique of spreading seeds, guerilla gardening is done in public places or other's private property in order to improve a neglected spot or otherwise benefit a certain area. Meanwhile, cottage gardening and chaos gardening share low- to no-maintenance of the gardens, but cottage gardening is more thoughtful and intentionally planted and feature pansies, foxgloves, and other old-fashioned varietals compared to the more modern herbs and vegetables in chaos gardening.

== See also ==
- Companion planting
