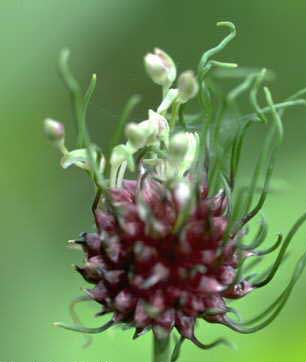
- Umbel showing bulbils and a few flowers

Scientific classification
- Kingdom: Plantae
- Clade: Tracheophytes
- Clade: Angiosperms
- Clade: Monocots
- Order: Asparagales
- Family: Amaryllidaceae
- Subfamily: Allioideae
- Genus: Allium
- Subgenus: A. subg. Allium
- Species: A. vineale

Binomial name
- Allium vineale L.

Synonyms
- Synonymy: Allium affine Boiss. & Heldr.; Allium arenarium Wahlenb. 1828, illegitimate homonym not L. 1753; Allium assimile Halácsy; Allium campestre Schleich. ex Steud.; Allium compactum Thuill.; Allium descendens W.D.J.Koch 1837, illegitimate homonym not L. 1753; Allium laxiflorum Tausch; Allium littoreum Bertol. 1827, illegitimate homonym not Bertol. 1819; Allium margaritaceum var. bulbiferum Batt. & Trab.; Allium nitens Sauzé & Maill.; Allium purshii G.Don; Allium rilaense Panov; Allium rotundum Wimm. & Grab. 1824, illegitimate homonym not L. 1762; Allium sphaerocephalum Crome ex Schltdl. 1824, illegitimate homonym not L. 1753; Allium subvineale Wendelbo; Allium vineale var. affine Regel; Allium vineale subsp. affine (Regel) K.Richt.; Allium vineale var. asperiflorum Regel; Allium vineale subsp. asperiflorum (Regel) K.Richt.; Allium vineale var. bulbiferum Syme; Allium vineale var. capsuliferum Syme; Allium vineale subsp. capsuliferum (Syme) K.Richt.; Allium vineale subsp. compactum (Thuill.) K.Richt.; Allium vineale var. compactum (Thuill.) Lej. & Courtois; Allium vineale var. descendens Nyman; Allium vineale var. kochii Lange; Allium vineale subsp. kochii (Lange) Nyman; Allium vineale var. multiflorum Baguet; Allium vineale var. nitens (Sauzé & Maill.) Nyman; Allium vineale var. purshii (G.Don) Regel; Getuonis vinealis (L.) Raf.; Porrum capitatum P.Renault; Porrum vineale (L.) Schur

= Allium vineale =

Crow garlic

Species of flowering plant

Allium vineale (wild garlic, onion grass, crow garlic or stag's garlic) is a perennial, bulb-forming species of wild onion, native to Europe, northwestern Africa, and the Middle East. The species was introduced in Australia and North America, where it has become an invasive species.

== Description ==
All parts of the plant have a strong garlic smell. The underground bulb is 1–2 cm (0.4–0.8 in) diameter, with a fibrous outer layer. The main (flower) stem grows to 30–120 cm (12–47 in) tall, bearing 2–4 leaves and an apical inflorescence 2–5 cm (0.8–2 in) diameter comprising a number of small bulbils and none to a few flowers, subtended by a basal bract.

The leaves are slender hollow tubes, 15–60 cm (6–24 in) long and 2–4 mm thick, with a waxy texture and a groove along the side of the leaf facing the stem. Although similar to the leaves of Allium schoenoprasum (chives), they tend to be more fibrous, have more vertical grooves, and have better defined grooves.

The inflorescence is a tight umbel surrounded by a membranous bract in bud which withers when the flowers open. Each individual flower is stalked and has a pinkish-green perianth 2.5 to 4.5 mm (3/32 to 3/16 in) long. There are six tepals, six stamens and a pistil formed from three fused carpels. Mixed with the flowers are several yellowish-brown bulbils.

The fruit is a capsule but the seeds seldom set and propagation usually takes place when the bulbils are knocked off and grow into new plants.

Plants with no flowers, only bulbils, are sometimes distinguished as the variety Allium vineale var. compactum, but this character is probably not taxonomically significant.

Although crow's garlic has an odour similar to true garlic, A. sativum, forms flowers full of bulbils just like garlic and dies back during summer, the leaf structure is more similar to those of chives, A. schoenoprasum, to which A. vineale is more closely related to than true garlic.

== Die back ==
During summer, just like domesticated garlic (A. sativum), after it forms the flower, the plant dies back over the course of the last summer months and sprouts back in mid autumn when precipitation increases and temperatures drop enough.

This is one of the reasons why the plants can be quite easily spread and become a weed, because during the most intense agricultural soil mechanical interactions, the weeds are almost impossible to identify, and both the bulbs and newly formed bulbils are dormant and less susceptible to die from mechanical damage.

== Uses and invasiveness ==
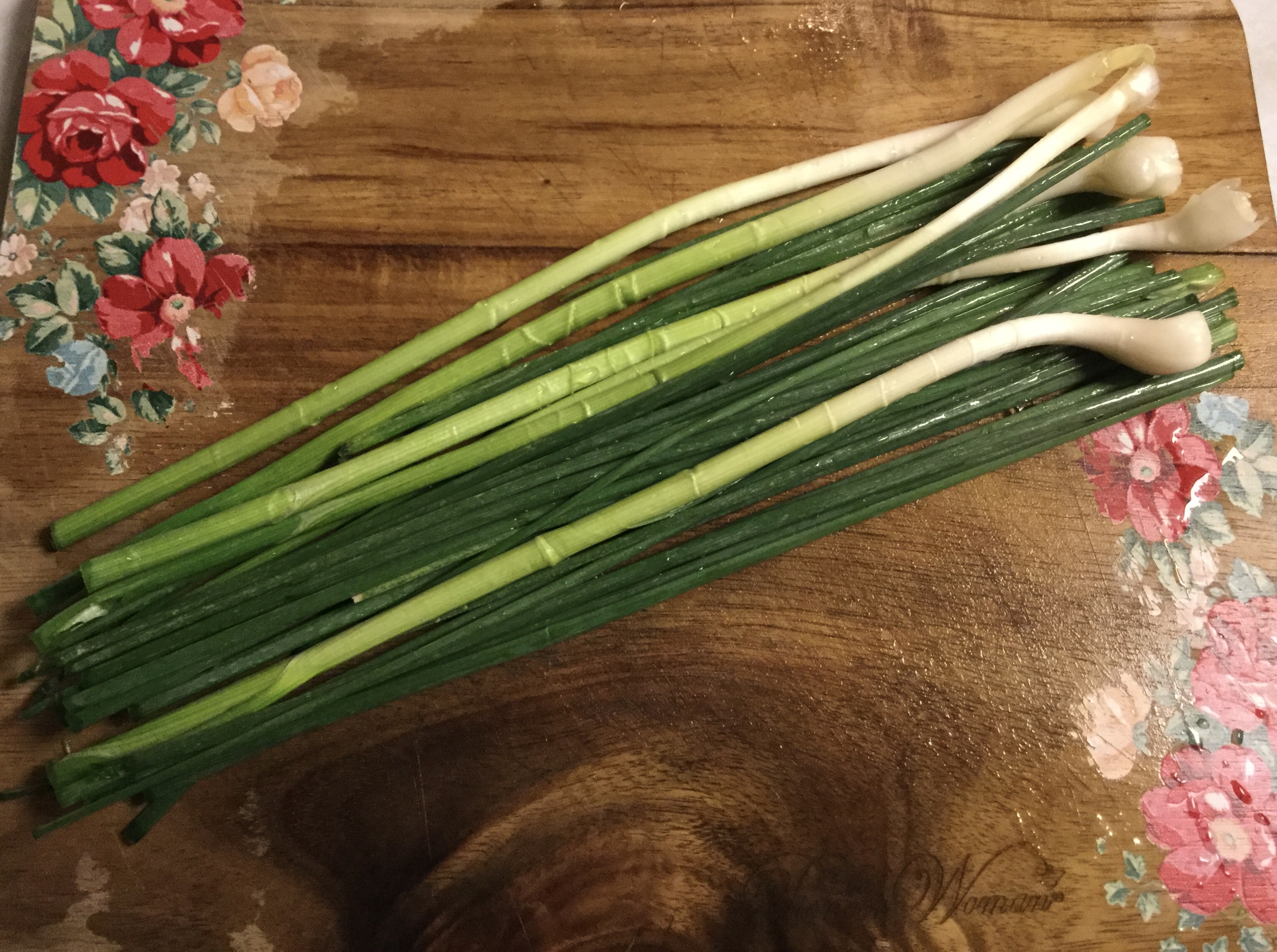
Wild onions washed and ready to be diced up for a fried rice dish. They add a pleasant garlic-like flavor to meals.

The leaves, flowers, and bulbs of Allium vineale are edible. While it has been suggested as a substitute for garlic, there is some difference of opinion as to whether there is an unpleasant aftertaste compared to that of common garlic (Allium sativum). It imparts a garlic-like flavour and odour on dairy and beef products when grazed by livestock. It is considered a pestilential invasive weed in the US, as grain products may become tainted with a garlic odour or flavour in the presence of aerial bulblets at the time of harvest. Wild garlic is tolerant to herbicides, which cannot cling well to the vertical, smooth and waxy structure of its leaves.

Allium vineale 'Hair', a cultivated variety, is sold as an ornamental plant in the UK and US. It has unusual flowerheads which have purple centres and green hair-like extensions.

== See also ==
- Allium
- Allium oleraceum
- List of beneficial weeds
