= Beneficial organism =

Organism that is beneficial for soil health

In agriculture and gardening, a beneficial organism is any organism that benefits the growing process, including insects, arachnids, other animals, plants, bacteria, fungi, viruses, and nematodes. Benefits include pest control, pollination, and maintenance of soil health. The opposite of beneficial organisms are pests, which are organisms deemed detrimental to the growing process. There are many different types of beneficial organisms as well as beneficial microorganisms. Also, microorganisms have things like salt and sugar in them. Beneficial organisms include but are not limited to: Birds, Bears, Nematodes, Insects, Arachnids, and fungi. The ways that birds and bears are considered beneficial is mainly because they consume seeds from plant and spread them through feces. Birds also prey on certain insects that eat plants and hinder them from growing these insects are known as non beneficial organisms. Nematodes are considered beneficial because they will help compost and provide nutrients for the soil the plants are growing in. Insects and arachnids help the growing process because they prey on non beneficial organisms that consume plants for food. Fungi help the growing process by using long threads of mycelium that can reach very long distances away from the tree or plant and bring water and nutrients back to the tree or plant roots.

== Beneficial or pest ==
The distinction between beneficial and pest is arbitrary, subjectively determined by examining the effect of a particular organism in a specific growing situation. There are many different types of beneficial organisms as well as beneficial microorganisms. Beneficial organisms include but are not limited to: Birds, Bears, Nematodes, Insects, Arachnids, and fungi. The ways that birds and bears are considered beneficial is mainly because they consume seeds from plant and spread them through feces. Birds also prey on certain insects that eat plants and hinder them from growing these insects are known as non beneficial organisms. Nematodes are considered beneficial because they will help compost and provide nutrients for the soil the plants are growing in. Insects and arachnids help the growing process because they prey on non beneficial organisms that consume plants for food. Fungi help the growing process by using long threads of mycelium that can reach very long distances away from the tree or plant and bring water and nutrients back to the tree or plant roots.

With beneficial organisms there is a flip side to these helpful organisms and that's the non beneficial organisms. These organisms hinder or stop the growing process or prey on beneficial organisms. Examples of these are Aphids, Assassin Bugs, and Japanese beetles. Aphids are attracted by pollen which is bad for plants because the aphids feed on the plants after they are located from spreading their pollen. Assassin Bugs are non beneficial because they feed on many beneficial insects by stabbing them with a horn on their head repeated times living up to its name "Assassin bug". Japanese beetles are especially a pest to gardeners and plants because the larvae feed on the stems and roots while full grown beetles feed on leaves and flowers killing the plant.

=== Insects ===
Beneficial insects can include predators (such as ladybugs) of pest insects, and pollinators (such as bees, which are an integral part of the growth cycle of many crops). Increasingly certain species of insects are managed and used to intervene where natural pollination or biological control is insufficient, usually due to human disturbance of the balance of established ecosystems.

=== Nematodes ===
Certain microscopic nematodes (worms) are beneficial in destroying and controlling populations of larvae that are damaging or deadly to crops and other plants. They are commonly used in organic gardening for their ability to kill various kinds of harmful larvae (fungus gnats, flea larvae, spidermites, weevils, grubs, wireworms, cutworms, and armyworms).

=== Animals ===
Birds and other animals may, by their actions, improve conditions in various growing situations, and in such cases are also beneficials. Birds assist in the spread of seeds by ingesting the fruits and berries of plants, then depositing the seeds in their droppings. Other animals, such as raccoons, bears, etc. provide similar benefits.

=== Plant ===
Plants that perform positive functions can also be considered beneficials (companion planting is one technique based on principle of beneficial plants).

== Issues ==
In agriculture, controversy surrounds the concept of beneficial insects. Much of this has to do with the effect of agrichemicals, like insecticides, herbicides and large quantities of synthetic fertilizers, on what are considered beneficials. Citing the reduction or elimination of various organisms as a side effect of agrichemical-based farming, some argue that critical damage is being done to various ecosystems, to the point where conventional agriculture is unsustainable in long term societal planning. For example, if bee populations are continued to be reduced by insecticides aimed at other pests, pollination will be further inhibited and crops don't fruit. If soil microorganisms are killed off, natural soil regeneration is inhibited, and reliance on mechanical and chemical inputs to keep the soil viable is increased, along with the fuel required to power these machines. The longer term impact of these conditions has not yet been determined. Commercial ventures currently exist to provide pollinators and biological pest control, such as beekeepers bringing their hives cross-country to any number of farms in spring to pollinate their crops, or purchasing ladybirds from garden centers in small containers.

== See also ==
- Integrated Pest Management
- Companion planting
- Sustainable gardening
- Sustainable landscaping
- Sustainable agriculture
- Organic farming
- Organic gardening
