= Beneficial insect =

Insect that is beneficial to humans

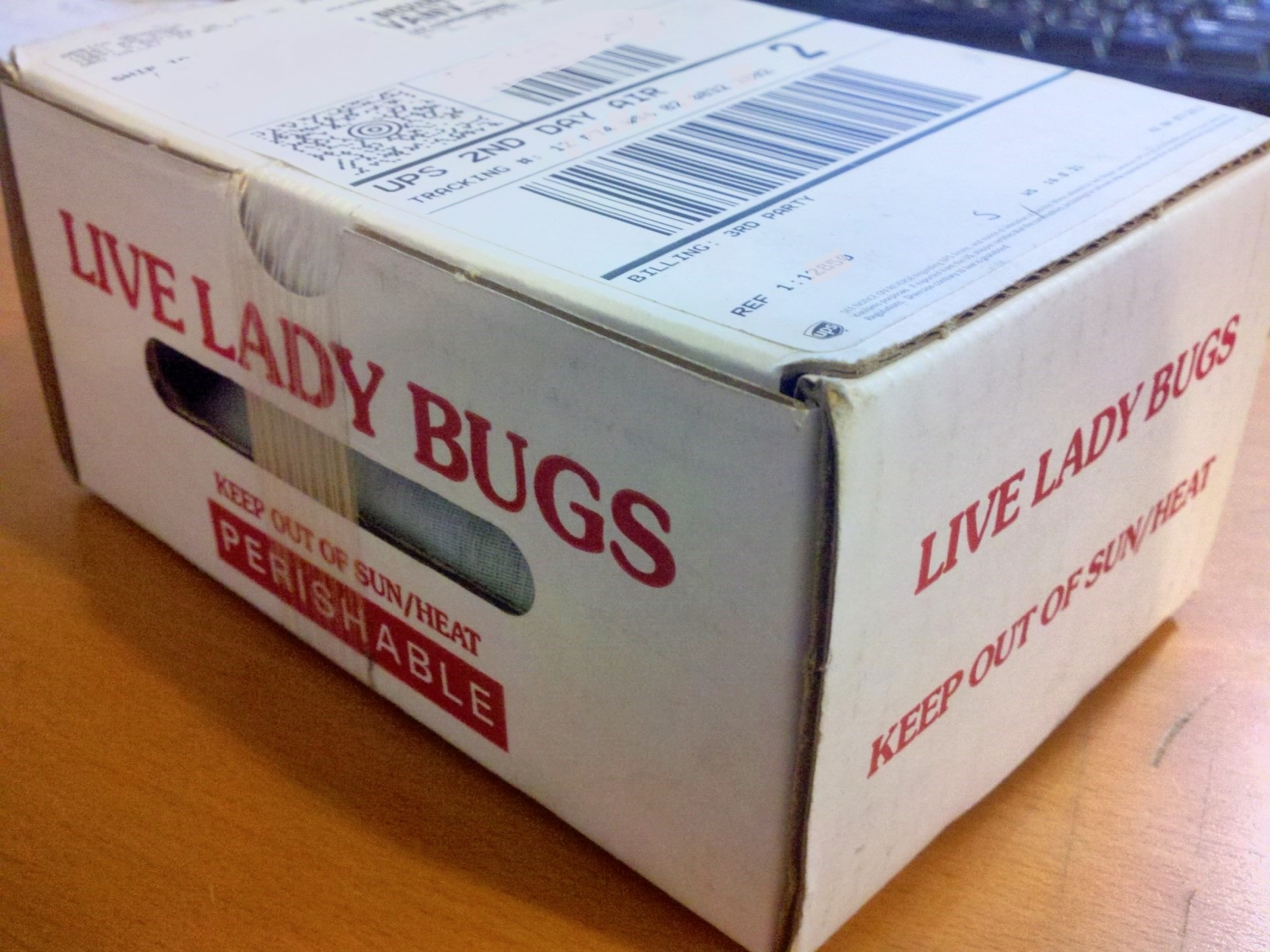
Ladybirds (also known as lady bugs in North America) are a beneficial insect commonly sold for biological control of aphids.

Beneficial insects (sometimes called beneficial bugs) are any of a number of species of insects that perform valued services like pollination and pest control. The concept of beneficial is subjective and only arises in light of desired outcomes from a human perspective. In agriculture, where the goal is to raise selected crops, insects that hinder the production process are classified as pests, while insects that assist production are considered beneficial. In horticulture and gardening, beneficial insects are often considered those that contribute to pest control and native habitat integration.

Encouraging beneficial insects, by providing suitable living conditions, is a pest control strategy, often used in organic farming, organic gardening or integrated pest management. Companies specializing in biological pest control sell many types of beneficial insects, particularly for use in enclosed areas, like greenhouses.

== Types ==
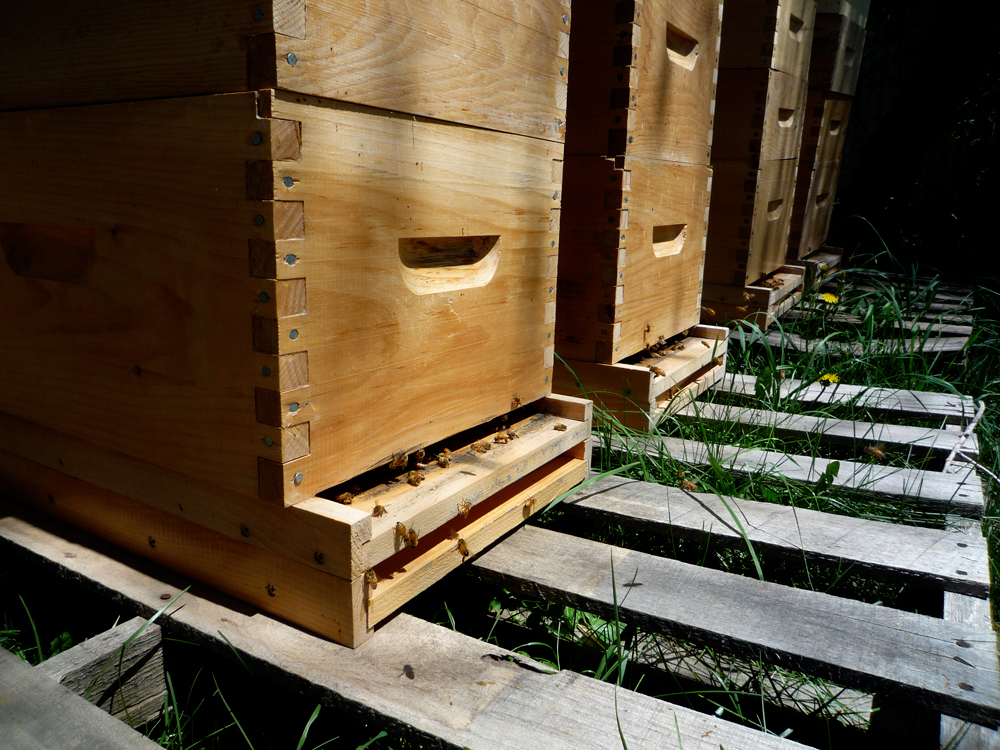
Bee boxes at an organic farm

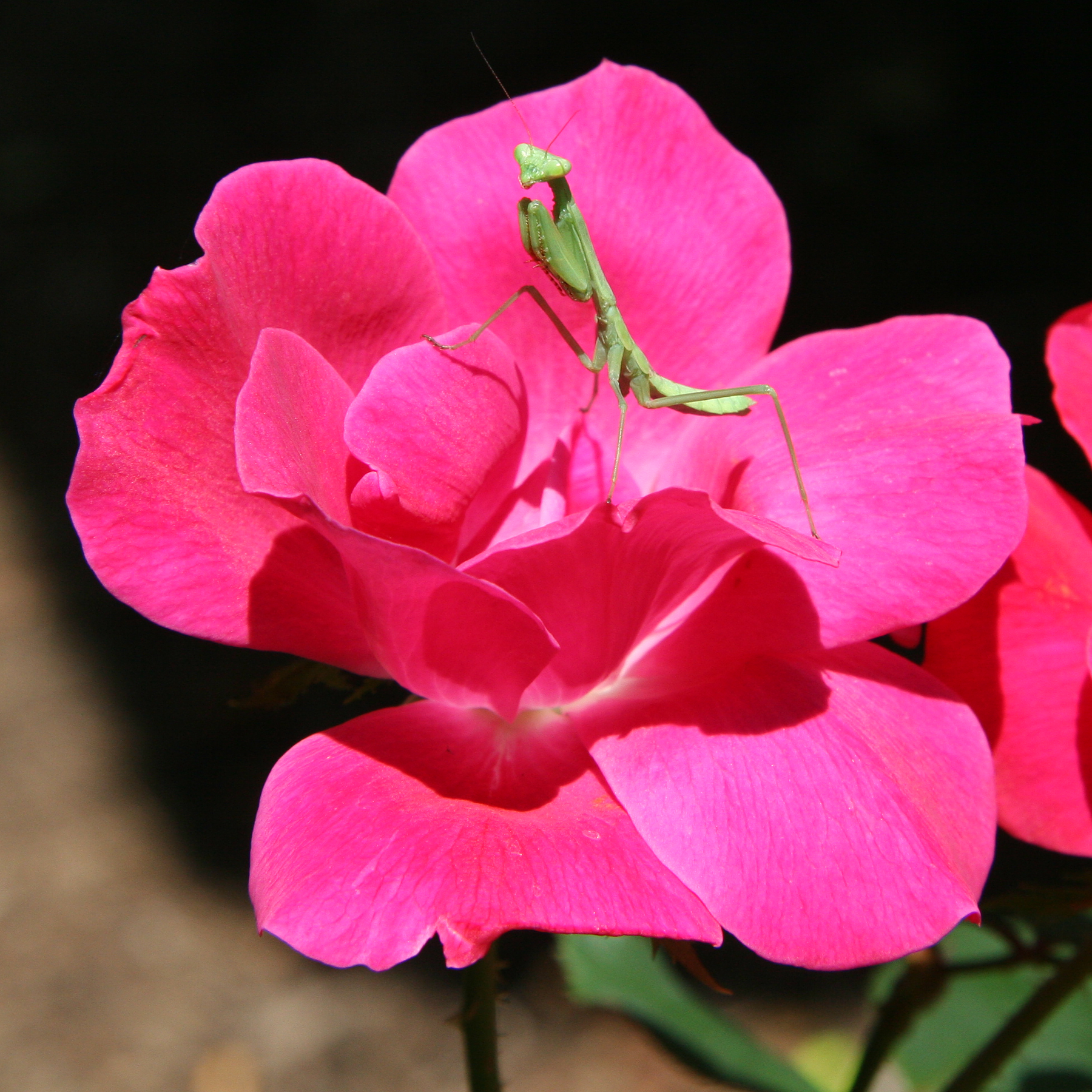
A Carolina mantis (Stagmomantis carolina) hunts for prey, using a rose flower as a vantage point.

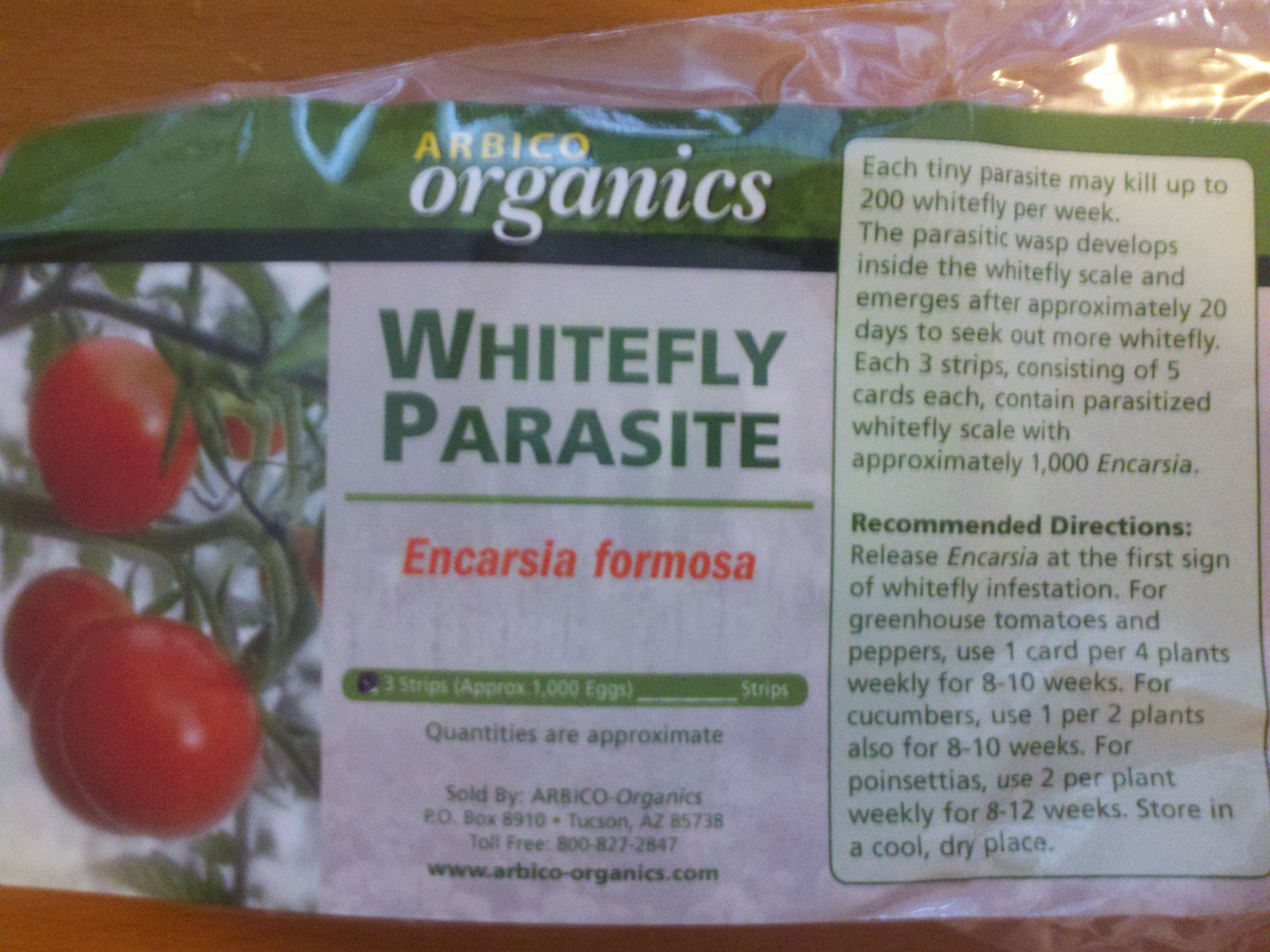
Encarsia formosa, an endoparasitic wasp, was one of the first biological control agents developed.

Some species of bee are beneficial as pollinators, although generally only efficient at pollinating plants from the same area of origin, facilitating propagation and fruit production for many plants. This group includes not only honeybees, but also many other kinds of bees that are more efficient at pollinating plants native to their region. Bees can be attracted by many companion plants, especially bee balm and pineapple sage for honeybees. Wasps, especially fig wasps are also beneficial as pollinators.

Ladybugs are generally thought of as beneficial because they eat large quantities of aphids, mites and other arthropods that feed on various plants.

Other insects commonly identified as beneficial include:

- Aphid midges
- Assassin bugs
- Damsel bugs
- Earwigs
- Green lacewings
- Ichneumon wasps
- Minute pirate bugs
- Fireflies
- Praying Mantis
- Soldier beetles
- Syrphid flies
- Tachinid flies
- Trichogramma wasps

== Attractive plants ==
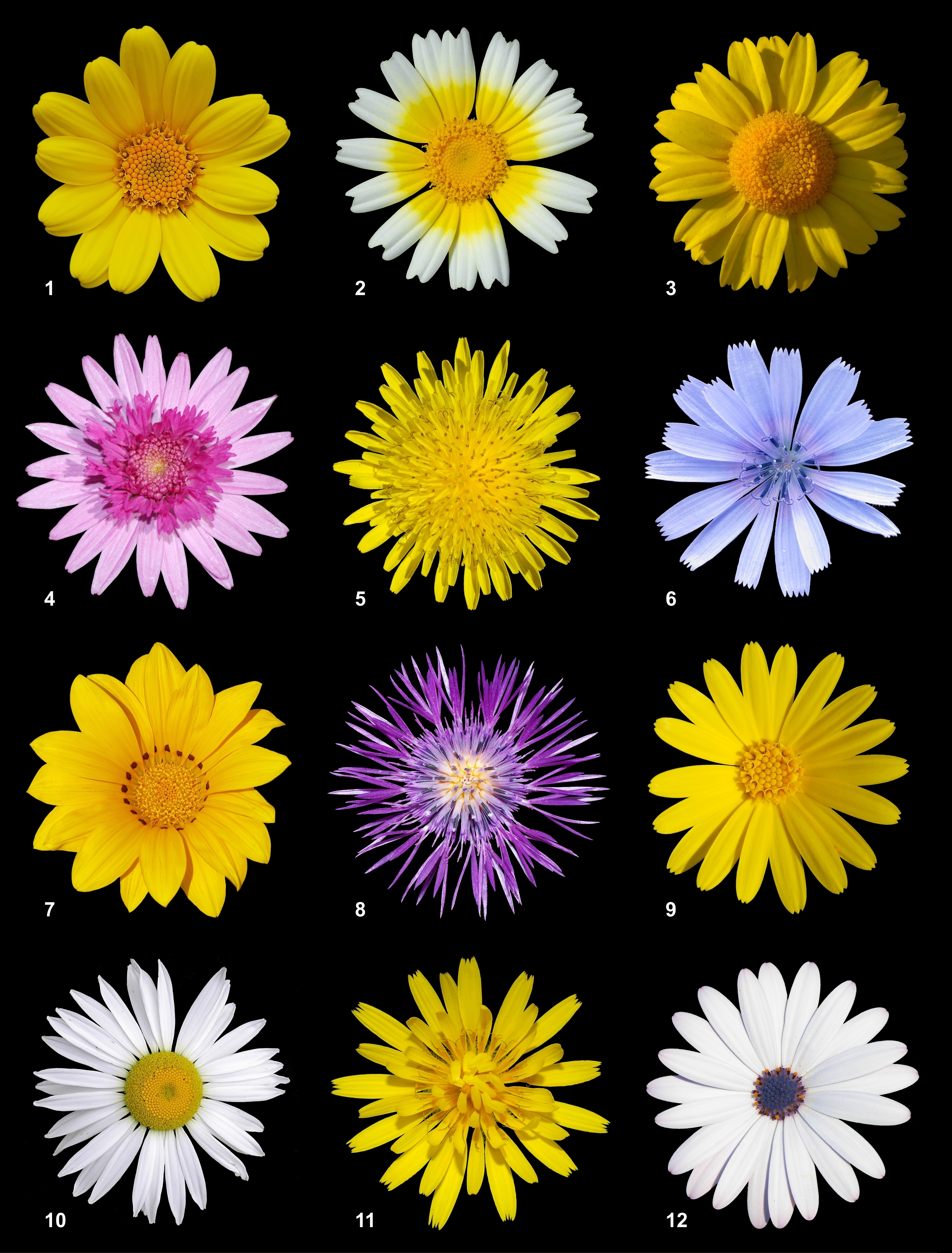
Many plants in the family Asteraceae attract beneficial insects.

Plants in the families Apiaceae and Asteraceae are generally valuable companions. Here are other plants that attract beneficial insects:

- Alfalfa
- Alyssum
- Borage
- Calendula
- Cilantro
- Cosmos
- Dandelion
- Dill
- Echinacea
- Fennel
- Hyssop
- Lupin
- Marigold
- Milkweed
- Nasturtium
- Parsley
- Phacelia
- Queen Anne's lace
- Rose
- Rudbeckia
- Sunflower
- Wildflowers
- Yarrow
- Zinnia

== See also ==
- Beneficial organism
- Beneficial weeds
- International Organization for Biological Control
- List of companion plants – a common companion plant's function is the attraction of beneficial insects.
- List of beneficial weeds
- Organic gardening
- Satoyama
- Sustainable gardening
- Wildlife garden
