= List of pest-repelling plants =

This list of pest-repelling plants includes plants used for their ability to repel insects, nematodes, and other pests. They have been used in companion planting as pest control in agricultural and garden situations, and in households.

Certain plants have shown effectiveness as topical repellents for haematophagous insects, such as the use of lemon eucalyptus sourced P-Menthane-3,8-diol, but incomplete research and misunderstood applications can produce variable results.

The essential oils of many plants are also well known for their pest-repellent properties. Oils from the families Lamiaceae (mints), Poaceae (true grasses), and Pinaceae (pines) are common haematophagous insect repellents worldwide.

== Table of pest-repelling plants ==
Plants that can be planted or used fresh to repel pests include:

Plant	Image	Pests
Artemisias		repels insects, including ants, cabbage looper, cabbage maggot, carrot fly, codling moth, flea beetles, whiteflies, the Cabbage White, and the Small White, as well as mice
Basil		repels flies, including mosquitoes the carrot fly, asparagus beetles and whiteflies
Borage		repels tomato hornworm and cabbage worms
Castor bean		repels moles
Catnip		repels ants, flea beetles, aphids, the Japanese beetle, squash bugs, weevils, the Colorado potato beetle, the cabbage looper, and cockroaches. May attract cats.
Chamomile		repels flying insects
Chives		repels carrot fly, Japanese beetle, and aphids
Chrysanthemums		repel roaches, ants, the Japanese beetle, ticks, silverfish, lice, fleas, bedbugs, and root-knot nematodes
Citronella grass		repels insects, may deter cats
Clovers		repel aphids and wireworms
Common lantana		repels mosquitoes
Coriander		repels aphids, Colorado potato beetle, and spider mites
Cosmos		repel the corn earworm
Crown imperial		repel rabbits, mice, moles, voles and ground squirrels
Dahlias		repel nematodes
Dill		repels aphids, squash bugs, spider mites, the cabbage looper, and the Small White
Epazote		repels spider mites, thrips, aphids, and whitefly
Eucalyptus		repels aphids, the cabbage looper, and the Colorado potato beetle
Fennel		repels aphids, slugs, and snails
Lantana ukambensis		repels mosquitoes
Four o'clocks		attract and poison the Japanese beetle
French marigold		repels whiteflies, kills nematodes
Garlic		repels root maggots, cabbage looper, Mexican bean beetle, and peach tree borer.
Geranium		repel leafhoppers, the corn earworm, and the Small White
Hyssop		repels the cabbage looper and the Small White
Larkspurs		repel aphids
Lavender		repels moths, scorpions, water scorpions, fleas, and flies, including mosquitoes
Leek		repels carrot fly
Lemongrass		repels mosquitoes
Lemon balm		repels mosquitoes
Lemon thyme		repels mosquitoes
Lettuce		repels carrot fly
Lime basil		repels mosquitoes
Mexican marigold		repels insects and rabbits
Myrrh		repels insects
Narcissus		repel moles
Nasturtiums		repel squash bugs, aphids (though there is conflicting information with some sources stating it attracts aphids), many beetles, and the cabbage looper
Onion		repels rabbits, the cabbage looper, and the Small White
Oregano		repellent to many pests
Parsley		repels asparagus beetles
Peppermint		repels aphids, cabbage looper, flea beetles, squash bugs, whiteflies, and the Small White
Petunias		repel aphids, tomato hornworm, asparagus beetles, leafhoppers, and squash bugs
Pitcher plants		traps and ingests insects
Radish		repels cabbage maggot and cucumber beetles
Rosemary		repels cabbage looper, carrot fly, cockroaches and mosquitoes, slugs, snails, as well as the Mexican bean beetle
Russian sage		repels wasps
Rue		repels cucumber and flea beetles
Sarracenia pitcher plants		are especially proficient at trapping yellowjacket wasps
Spearmint		repels fleas, moths, ants, beetles, rodents, aphids, squash bugs, and the cabbage looper
Spiny amaranth		repels cutworms
Stone root		repels mosquitoes
Summer savory		repels bean beetles
Tansy		repels ants, many beetles and flies, squash bugs, cutworms, Small White, and Cabbage White
Thyme		repels cabbage looper, cabbage maggot, corn earworm, whiteflies, tomato hornworm, and Small White
Tobacco		repels carrot fly, flea beetles and worms.
Tomato		repels asparagus beetles
Venus flytrap		ingests insects

== See also ==
Pelargonium citrosum
