= Living mulch =

Cover crop grown with a main crop as mulch

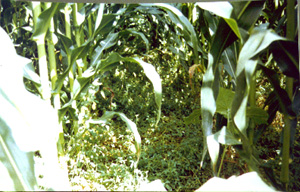
Living mulch planted to retard weed growth between corn rows

In agriculture, a living mulch is a cover crop interplanted or undersown with a main crop, and intended to serve the purposes of a mulch, such as weed suppression and regulation of soil temperature. Living mulches grow for a long time with the main crops, whereas cover crops are incorporated into the soil or killed with herbicides.

Other benefits of mulches are slowing the growth of weeds, and protecting soil from water and wind erosion. Some living mulches were found to increase populations of the natural enemies of crop pests. Legumes used as living mulches also provide nitrogen fixation, reducing the need for fertilizer.

== Benefits ==
When cover crops are turned over into the soil, they contribute nutrients to the main crop so that less chemical fertilizer is required. The amount of the contribution depends on the biomass, which varies over time and depends on rainfall and other factors. The greater the biomass, the greater the nutrient turnover of land. Legume cover crops turn over nitrogen fixed from the atmosphere. Reports indicate that legumes in general have higher foliar nitrogen contents, from 20 to 45 mg g-1.

Bare soil resulting from intensive tillage can lead to soil erosion, nutrient losses, and offsite movement of pesticides. In addition, weeds can germinate and grow without competition. Living mulches can reduce water runoff and erosion, and protect waterways from pollution. Living mulches have also been shown to increase the population of organisms which are natural enemies of some crop pests.

Living mulches control weeds in two ways. When they are seeded before weed establishment, they suppress weeds by competition. In some situations, the allelopathic properties of living mulches can be used to control weeds. For example, the allelopathic properties of winter rye (Secale cereale), ryegrasses (Lolium spp), and subterrain clover (Trifolium subterraneum) can be used to control weeds in sweet corn (Zea mays var "rugosa") and snap beans (Phaseolus vulgaris).

Populations of ground-dwelling predators were greater in a corn and soybean rotation with alfalfa and kura clover living mulches than without a living mulch. This situation was due in part to a change in the composition of vegetation in the agricultural system.

== Drawbacks ==
Living mulches compete for nutrients and water with the main crop, and this can reduce yields. For example, Elkins et al. (1983) examined the use of tall fescue (Festuca arundinacea), smooth bromegrass (Bromus inermis), and orchargrass (Dactylis glomerata) as living mulches. They found that herbicides killed 50% to 70% of the mulches but corn yield was reduced 5% to 10% at the end of the harvest.

Although leguminous cover crops have large biomass production and turnover, they are not likely to increase soil organic matter. This is because legumes used as living mulches have greater N contents and a low C to N ratio. So when legume residue decomposes, soil microbes have sufficient N available to enhance their breakdown of organic materials in the soil.

== Types ==
In the tropics, it is common to seed tree crops with living mulches such as legume covers in oil palm plantations, coconut and rubber.

Living mulches are sometimes used in cool-climate viticulture, where competition for water can be advantageous as it can prevent vines from becoming overly-vegetative.

In Mexico, legumes used traditionally as living mulches were tested as nematode and weed suppressors. The mulches included velvetbean (Mucuna pruriens) jackbean (Canavalia ensiformis), jumbiebean (Leucaena leucocephala) and wild tamarindo (Lysiloma latisiliquum). Aqueous extract of Velvetbean reduced the gall index of Meloidogyne incognita in the roots of tomato, but suppressed tomato rooting as well. In addition, Velvetbean suppressed the radical growth of the local weeds Alegria (Amaranthus hypochondriacus) by 66% and Barnyardgrass (Echinochloa crus-galli) by 26.5%.

Nicholson and Wien (1983) suggested the use of short turfgrasses and clovers as living mulches to improve the resistance soil compaction. These authors established Smooth Meadow-grass (Poa pratensis) and white clover (Trifolium repens) as living mulches since they did not cause reduction of yield corn (the accompanying main crop).

In one study, chewing fescue or red fescue (Festuca rubra) and ladino clover (Trifolium repens) were effective living mulches for controlling weed growth. Unfortunately, these cover crops also competed with corn for water which was particularly problematic during a dry period. The possibility of using ladino clover (Trifolium repens) as a potential living mulch was also mentioned; however, this clover was difficult to kill with herbicides in winter.

== Management ==
Because they compete with the main crop, living mulches may eventually need to be mechanically or chemically killed.

It is important to judiciously select the appropriate herbicide rate for burning down a living mulch. In 1989, Echtenkamp and Moomaw found that herbicide rates were inadequate to suppress all the living mulches. Therefore, the mulches competed with the main crop for resources. In some cases, the clover could not be killed at the first herbicide application, so a second application was needed. For another treatment, rates that were so high that they caused the cover crop to be killed too rapidly, so that broadleaf weeds invaded the corn. This study suggested that the timing and dosage of herbicide should be carefully considered.

Living mulches were tested in a no-till corn-production systems with two methods for establishing grass and legume living mulches (grass and legume) between corn rows. In 1985, there was no difference between drilling and broadcasting seeds by hand in that study. However, in 1986, drilling resulted in higher populations (97 plants m-2) than broadcasting (64 plants m-2), likely because of precipitation levels. Precipitation should be considered because farmers have no control over it.

Beard (1973) recommended chewing fescue (red fescue) (Festuca rubra var "commutata" var "shadow FESRU") as a good living mulch because it adapts to the shady conditions under corn and soybean. This grass is also well adapted to dry and poor soils.

== Plant nutrition ==
Legume cover crops have important positive effects on the nutrient cycling of tree crops. Leguminous living mulches work in three ways:

- Fixing the atmospheric N_{2} that is important for the main crop,
- Recycling soil nutrients, and
- Enhancing soil nutrient availability for the main crop.

Lehmann et al. (2000) measured the above ground biomass accumulation of Pueraria phaseoloides, which is a living mulch used in tropical tree crops. They found that Pueraria accumulated 8.8 metric ton of dm (dry matter) ha-1 as compared with 4.4 t dm ha^{−1} for Theobroma grandiflorum, and 1.4 t dm ha-1 for Bactris gasipaes. These latter two species are native cultivated species from the Amazon.

== Control of erosion ==
Vegetative cover as living mulches protect soil against wind and water erosion. Plants should form a mantle or thick mulch that protects the soil from detachment. Living mulches intercept raindrops and reduce runoff. The protection such vegetation provides against wind is influenced mainly by the amount of biomass covering the ground (differs with each species), plant geometry, and row orientation.

In one experiment, water runoff and soil loss on a 14% slope was compared for rototilled (RT), no-till with corn stover mulch (NT-CSM), no-till in CSM+ birdsfoot trefoil living mulch (NT-BFT) and no till in CSM and crownvetch living mulch (NT-CV). The results indicated that the water runoff was 6,350 L ha-1 for NT-BFT, 6,350 L ha-1 NT-CSM, 5,925 L ha-1 for NT-CV, and 145,000 L ha-1 for RT. The soil loss for the RT was 14.22 t ha-1 while with the other treatments it was less than 0.5 tons ha-1. The least soil loss was obtained with NT-CV 0.02 tons ha-1. Reducing water runoff and erosion is one of the most significant advantages of having a cover crop. Soil can be easily eroded with no vegetative ground cover or plant residue. Ideally soil erosion should be less than 4 to 5 tons/ha/year.

== See also ==
- Mulch
- Plastic mulch
