= Trap crop =

Plant that attracts agricultural pests away from nearby crops

A trap crop is a plant that attracts agricultural pests, usually insects, away from nearby harvested crops. This form of companion planting can save a main crop from decimation by pests with reduced use of artificial pesticides. A trap crop is used for attracting the insect and pests away from a target crop field or individual crop plants within a field. Many trap crops have successfully diverted pests from focal crops in small scale greenhouse, garden and field experiments; a small portion of these plants have been shown to reduce pest damage at larger commercial scales. A common explanation for reported trap cropping failures, is that attractive trap plants only protect nearby plants if the insects do not move back into the target crop. In a review of 100 trap cropping examples in 2006, only 10 trap crops were classified as successful at a commercial scale, and in all successful cases, trap cropping was supplemented with management practices that specifically limited insect dispersal from the trap crop back into the target crop. Quantitative models of pests moving between trap and main crops suggest that in the absence of such methods a substantial proportion of the landscape has to be dedicated to the trap crop, limiting the feasibility such a strategy if growers are not willing to sacrifice that much space to unharvested trap plants. In such cases optimal trap crop allocations can be up to roughly 30 percent of the field.

== Examples ==
Examples of trap crops include:

- Alfalfa planted in strips among cotton, to draw away lygus bugs, while castor beans surround the field, or tobacco planted in strips among it, to protect from the budworm Heliothis.
- Rose enthusiasts often plant Pelargonium geraniums among their rosebushes because Japanese beetles are drawn to the geraniums, which are toxic to them.
- Chervil is used by gardeners to protect vegetable plants from slugs.
- Rye, sesbania, and sicklepod are used to protect soybeans from corn seeding maggots, stink bugs, and velvet green caterpillars, respectively.
- Mustard and alfalfa planted near strawberries to attract lygus bugs, a method pioneered by Jim Cochran.
- Blue Hubbard squash is planted near cucurbit crops to attract squash vine borer, squash bugs, and both spotted and striped Cucumber beetle.
- In push-pull agricultural pest management, napier grass or signal grass (Brachiaria brizantha) are used as trap crops to attract stemboring moths such as Chilo partellus.

Trap crops can be planted around the circumference of the field to be protected, which is assumed to act as a barrier for entry by pests, or they can be interspersed among the main crop, for example being planted every ninth row. Planting crops in rows helps facilitate supplemental management practices that prevent insect pest dispersal back into the main field, such as driving a vehicle above the trap crop which then removes insect pests by vacuuming them off of the trap crop row or targeted insecticides, which are only deployed on the trap crop. Even if pesticides are used to control insects on the trap crop, total pesticides are greatly reduced in this scenario over conventional agricultural pesticide applications because they are only deployed on a small portion of the farm (the trap crop). Other strategies that prevent dispersal of insect pests back into the main crop include cutting the trap plants, applying predators or parasitoids to the trap plant that eat the pest, and planting a high ratio of trap plants to other plants.

Trap crops, when used on an industrial scale, are generally planted at a key time in the pest's life-cycle, and then destroyed before that life-cycle finishes and the pest might have transferred from the trap plants to the main crop.

== Mechanism ==
Recent studies on host-plant finding have shown that flying pests are far less successful if their host-plants are surrounded by any other plant, or even "decoy-plants" made of green plastic, cardboard or any other green material. The host-plant finding process occurs in three phases.

The first phase is stimulation by odours characteristic to the host-plant. This induces the insect to try to land on the plant it seeks. But insects avoid landing on brown (bare) soil. So if only the host-plant is present, the insects will quasi-systematically find it by landing on the only green thing around. This is called an "appropriate landing". When it does an "inappropriate landing", it flies off to any other nearby patch of green. It eventually leaves the area if there are too many "inappropriate" landings.

The second phase of host-plant finding is for the insect to make short flights from leaf to leaf to assess the plant's overall suitability. The number of leaf-to-leaf flights varies according to the insect species and to the host-plant stimulus received from each leaf. But the insect must accumulate sufficient stimuli from the host-plant to lay eggs; so it must make a certain number of consecutive "appropriate" landings. Hence if it makes an "inappropriate landing", the assessment of that plant is negative and the insect must start the process anew.

Thus, a clover ground cover was shown to have the same disruptive effect on eight pest species from four insect orders. An experiment showed that 36% of cabbage root flies laid eggs beside cabbages growing in bare soil (which resulted in no crop), compared with only 7% beside cabbages growing in clover (which allowed a good crop). Moreover, simple decoys made of green cardboard disrupted appropriate landings just as well as the clover.

== See also ==
- Tropaeolum
