= Muscovy =

Muscovy or Moscovia (Russian: Московия, romanized: Moskoviya) is:

- a Latin name of Moscow
- an alternate name of the Grand Principality of Moscow (1263–1547).
- an alternate name of the Tsardom of Russia (1547–1721).

Variations include Muscovia, Muskovia, and Moscovy.

The name may also refer to:

- Muscovy Company, an English trading company chartered in 1555
- Muscovy duck (Cairina moschata)
- Domestic Muscovy duck (Cairina moschata domestica)
- Moscovia (region), a historical region in central Russia
- Muscovy glass, or muscovite, a mineral
- Muscovy, a fictional "parallel world" Russia in Phillip Pullman's His Dark Materials

== See also ==
- Moskovia Airlines, a defunct Russian airline
- Moscobia Convent, a convent established by the Russian Orthodox Church in Ein Karem
- Moskal, a designation used for the residents of the Grand Duchy of Moscow and Russia, currently an ethnic slur
