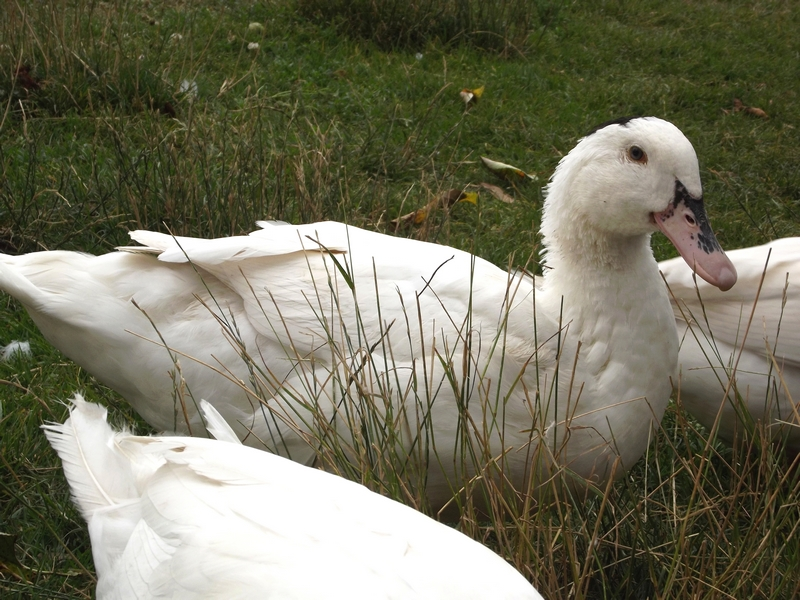

Conservation status
- Domesticated

Scientific classification
- Kingdom: Animalia
- Phylum: Chordata
- Class: Aves
- Order: Anseriformes
- Family: Anatidae
- Subfamily: Anatinae
- Hybrid: Anas platyrhynchos × Cairina moschata

= Mulard =

Hybrid duck

The mulard (or moulard) is a hybrid between two different genera of domestic duck: the domestic Muscovy duck (derived from the Muscovy duck Cairina moschata) and the domestic duck (derived from the mallard Anas platyrhynchos). American Pekins and other domestic ducks are most commonly used to breed mulards due to the breed's high meat production. Like many interspecific F1 hybrids, mulards are sterile, giving them the nickname mule ducks. While it is possible to produce mulards naturally, artificial insemination is used more often with greater success.

The term mulard or moulard is generally reserved for offspring where the parental drake is a Muscovy and the duck is a Pekin. When the drake is a Pekin, the offspring tend to be smaller and are called hinnies.

== Husbandry and production ==
The mulard is commercially produced on farms for meat and foie gras. The White Muscovy and the Pekin are the two most common purebred, commercially farmed ducks. Hybrids of the two are hardier and calmer, in addition to exhibiting natural hybrid vigor.

The incubation period of the hybrid eggs is between the mallard and Muscovy, with an average of 32 days. About half of the eggs hatch into mulard ducks. Mulards tend to combine certain traits of the parent breeds. Due to their Muscovy heritage, they produce leaner meat than Pekins; females tend to be raised for meat, while males are used for foie gras. Like Muscovy ducks, mulards have claws on their feet, but do not fly and perch; instead, they prefer to stay near water, as Pekins do.

Traditionally, foie gras was primarily produced with geese, but by the 1960s the majority of farmers began to use mulards. Geese are more expensive to maintain than ducks (they are larger and more aggressive), and the more temperamental Muscovies did not accept the process of gavage (force feeding) as readily as Pekins, causing the quality of the foie gras to suffer. This problem was avoided by the introduction of mulards. These hybrids have also become extremely common in countries where foie gras is not produced.

Today in France, the leading foie gras producer and consumer, the use of hybrid ducks outnumbers the use of geese. In 2007, there were 35 million mulard ducks raised in the country, compared with only 800,000 geese. In addition to Europe and the United States, mulards are widely raised throughout Southeast Asia.

== Gallery ==
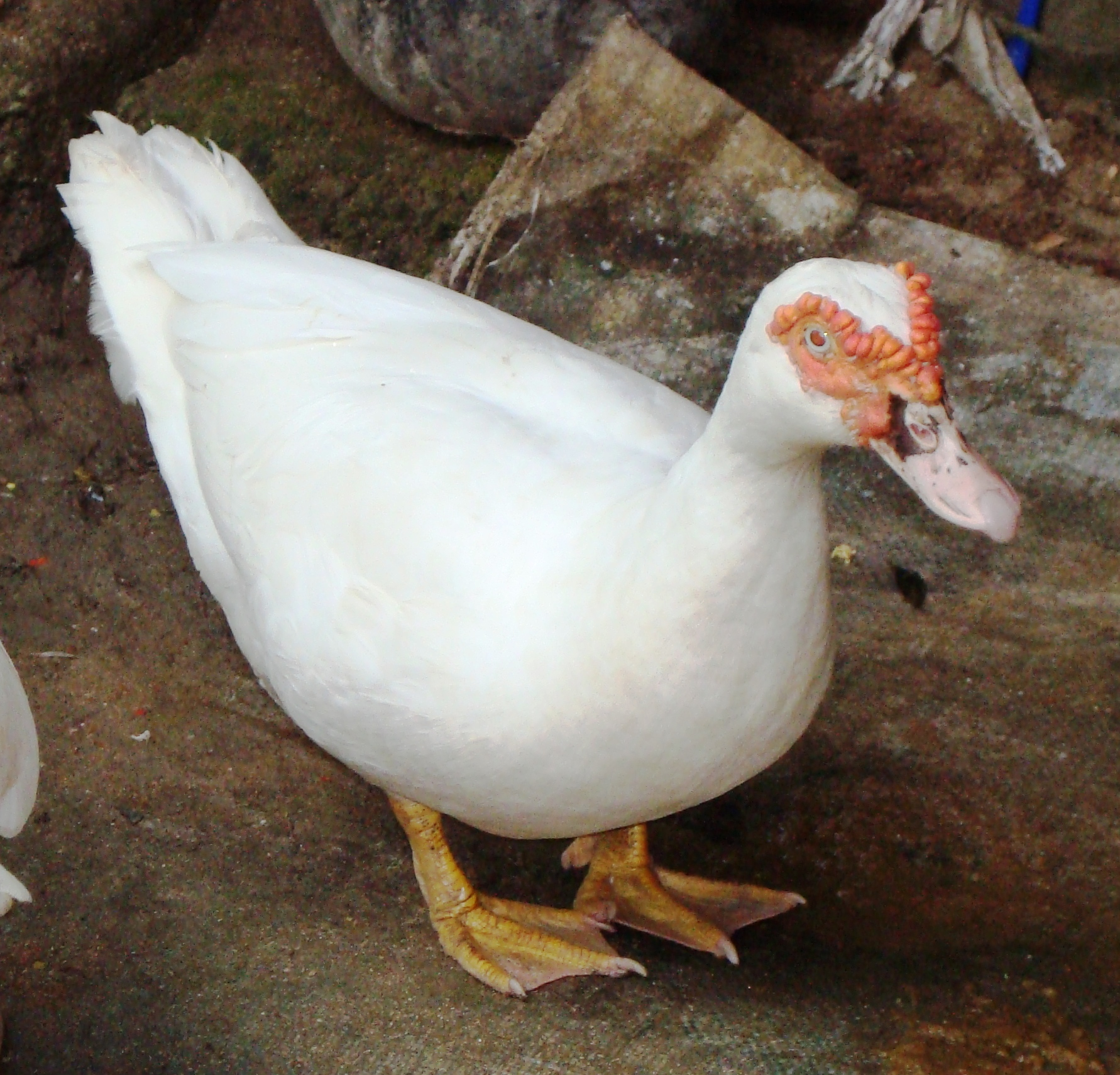
Muscovy duck

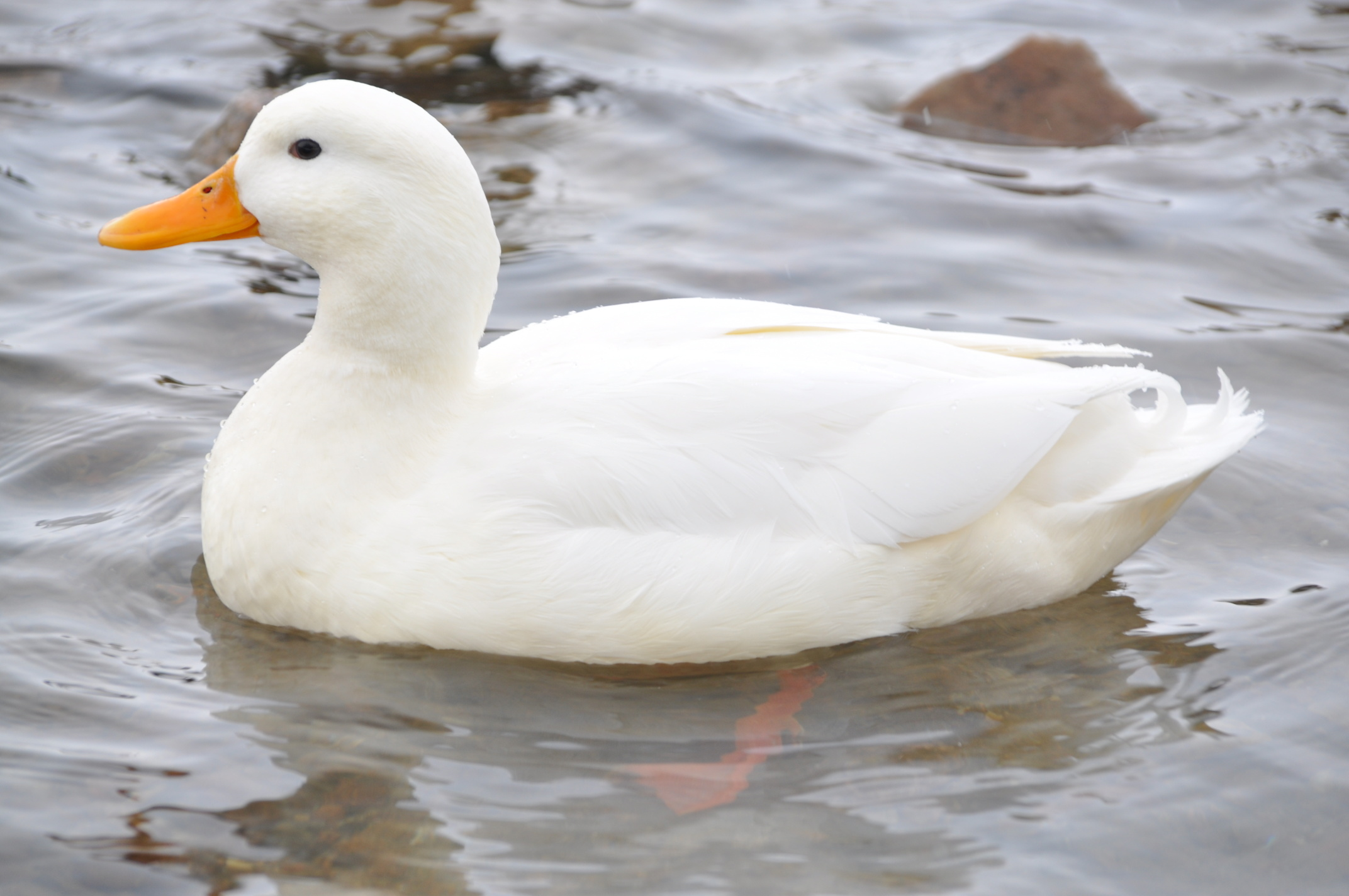
Pekin drake

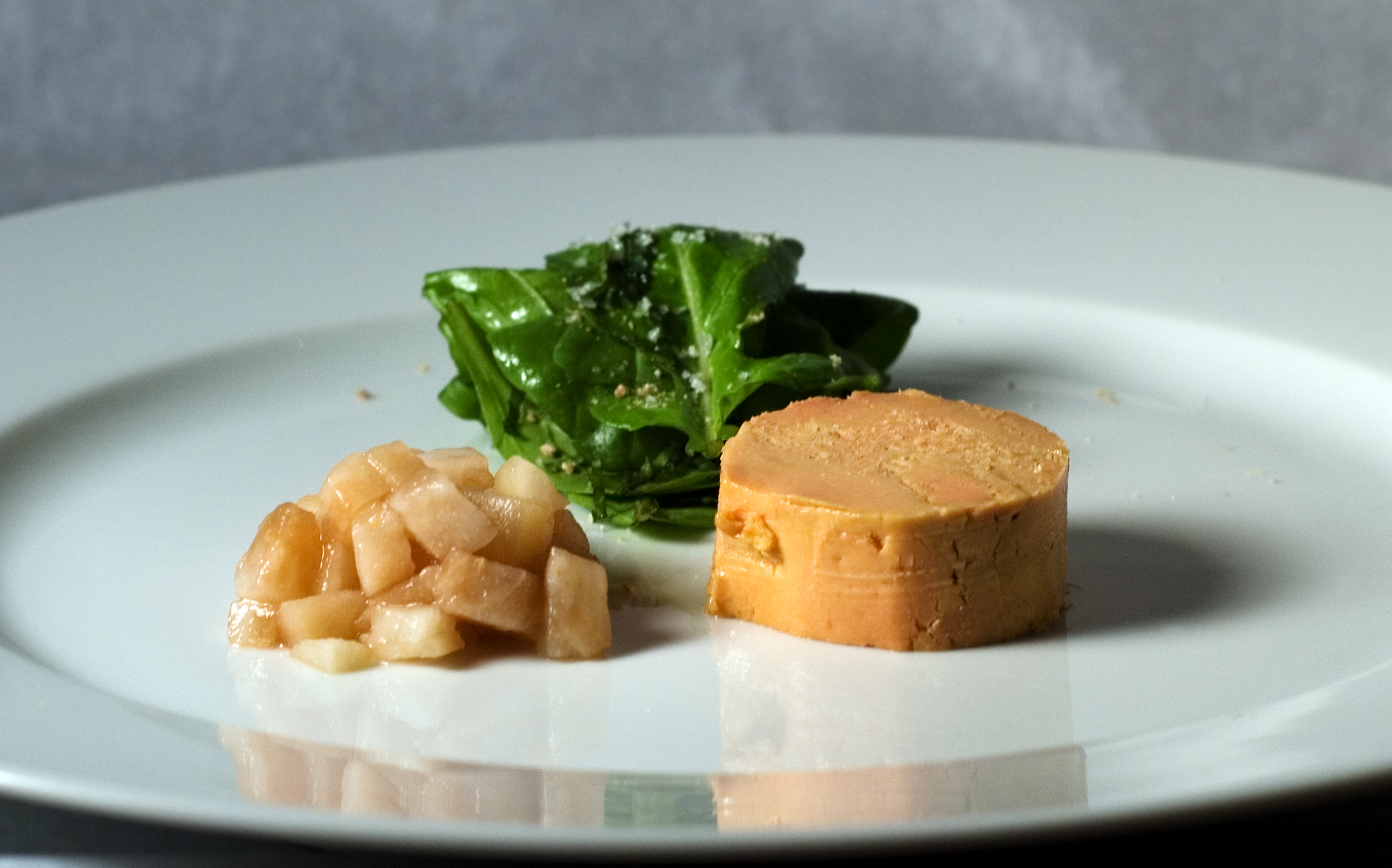
Moulard Duck Foie Gras with Pickled Pear

== See also ==
- List of duck breeds
