= Domestic Muscovy duck =

Subspecies of bird

Muscovy
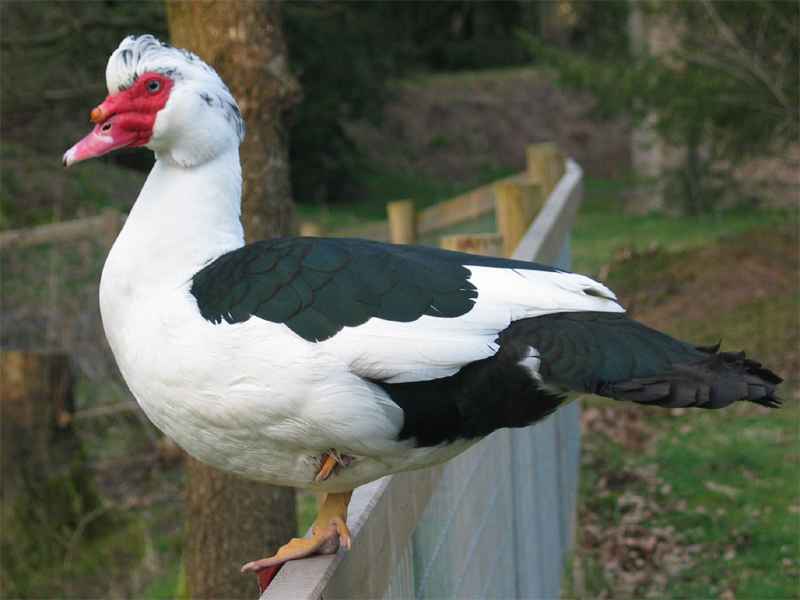
- White-headed black magpie drake

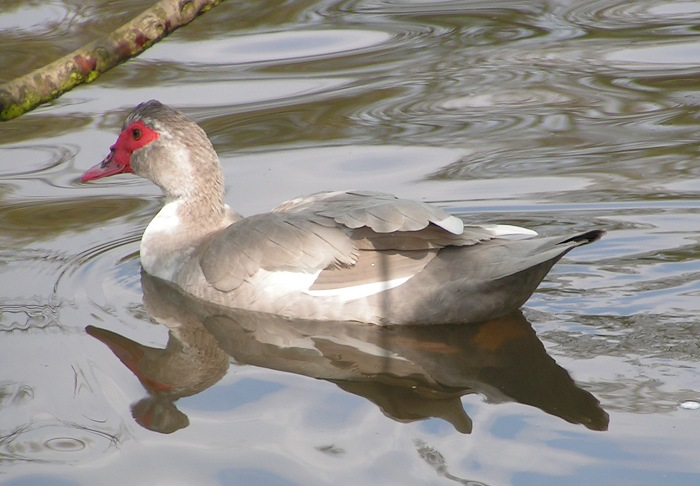
- Lavender duck
- Conservation status: GEH (2023): Cat. IV: Watch
- Other names: Barbary
- Use: meat, cross-breeding

Traits
- Weight: Male: 4.5–6.3 kg (10–14 lb); Female: 2.3–3.2 kg (5–7 lb).

Classification
- EE: yes
- Muscovy duck; Cairina moschata "domestica"

The Muscovy or Barbary is the domestic form of the wild Muscovy duck, Cairina moschata. There are a number of local or regional breeds, and drakes of these are commonly cross-bred with mallard-derived domestic ducks to produce the hybrids called mulards.

== History ==
The Muscovy had been domesticated by various indigenous peoples of the Americas well before the arrival of Christopher Columbus in 1492.

== Characteristics ==
Domestic Muscovy drakes weigh some 4.5–6.3 kg. The duck is much smaller, typically about half the size of the drake, with a weight of 2.3–3.2 kg.

Recognised colour varieties include five solid colours – black, blue, chocolate, lavender and white – and eight 'magpie' colours, in which the whole back from the tail to the shoulders and the underside from below the tail to the breast is coloured black, blue, chocolate or lavender, the remainder being white. In the standard magpie colourings the crown of the head is also coloured; in the white-headed magpie colours the head is white.

== Use ==
The Muscovy is commonly reared for meat.

In commercial production, it is often cross-bred – either naturally or by artificial insemination – with a mallard-derived domestic duck to produce the hybrid known as a mulard.. In France – where 35 million mulards were reared in 2007 – the duck is usually a Rouen or Pekin; in Taiwan, local breeds such as the Tsaiya or Kaiya (Tsaiya x Pekin cross) are used. These hatch in about four weeks and grow rapidly like a mallard-type duck, but to about the size and weight of the Muscovy. The inverse cross – domestic drake with Muscovy duck – is also possible, but infrequent. In France the mulard is reared both for its meat and for its liver; ducks are used principally to produce magret de canard, while drakes – which are better able to withstand the gavage or force-feeding employed – are reared for foie gras de canard. In countries such as China, Taiwan and Vietnam, mulards are reared mainly for their meat, which is less fatty than that of the Pekin.

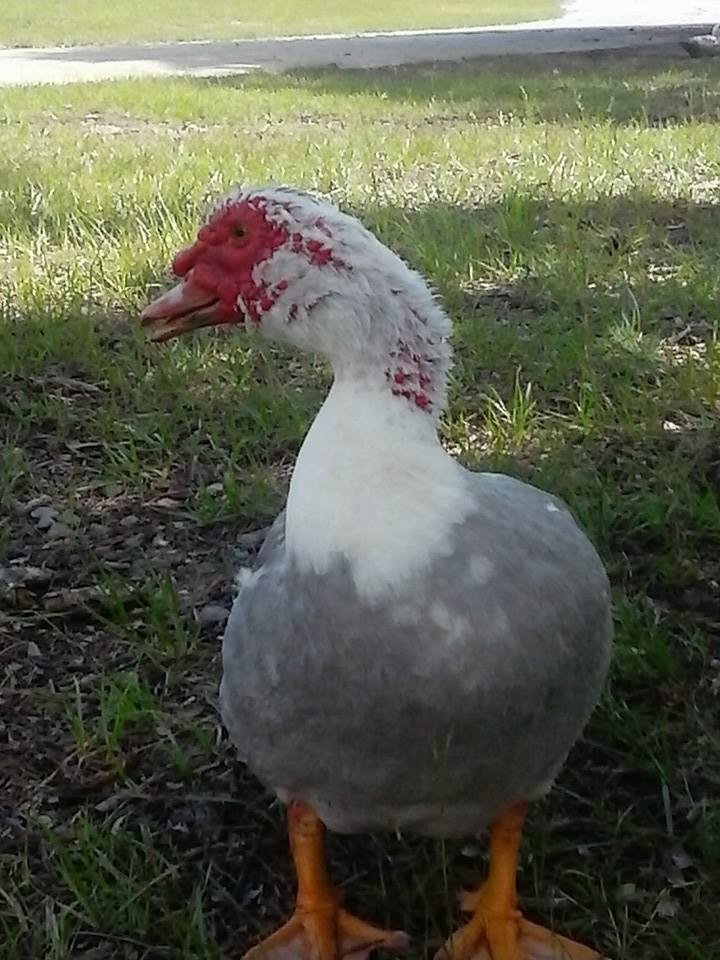
Lavender drake

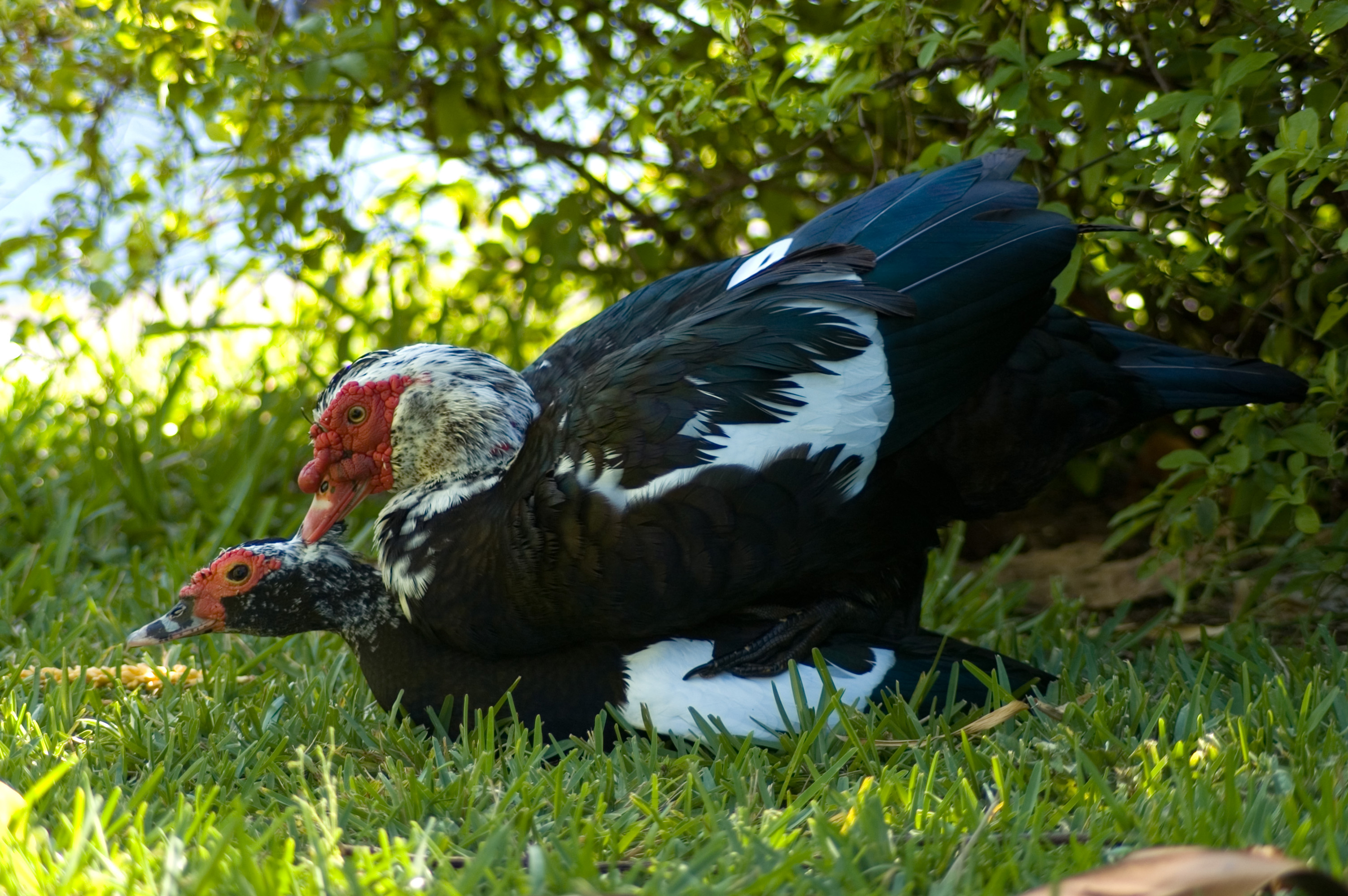
Mating

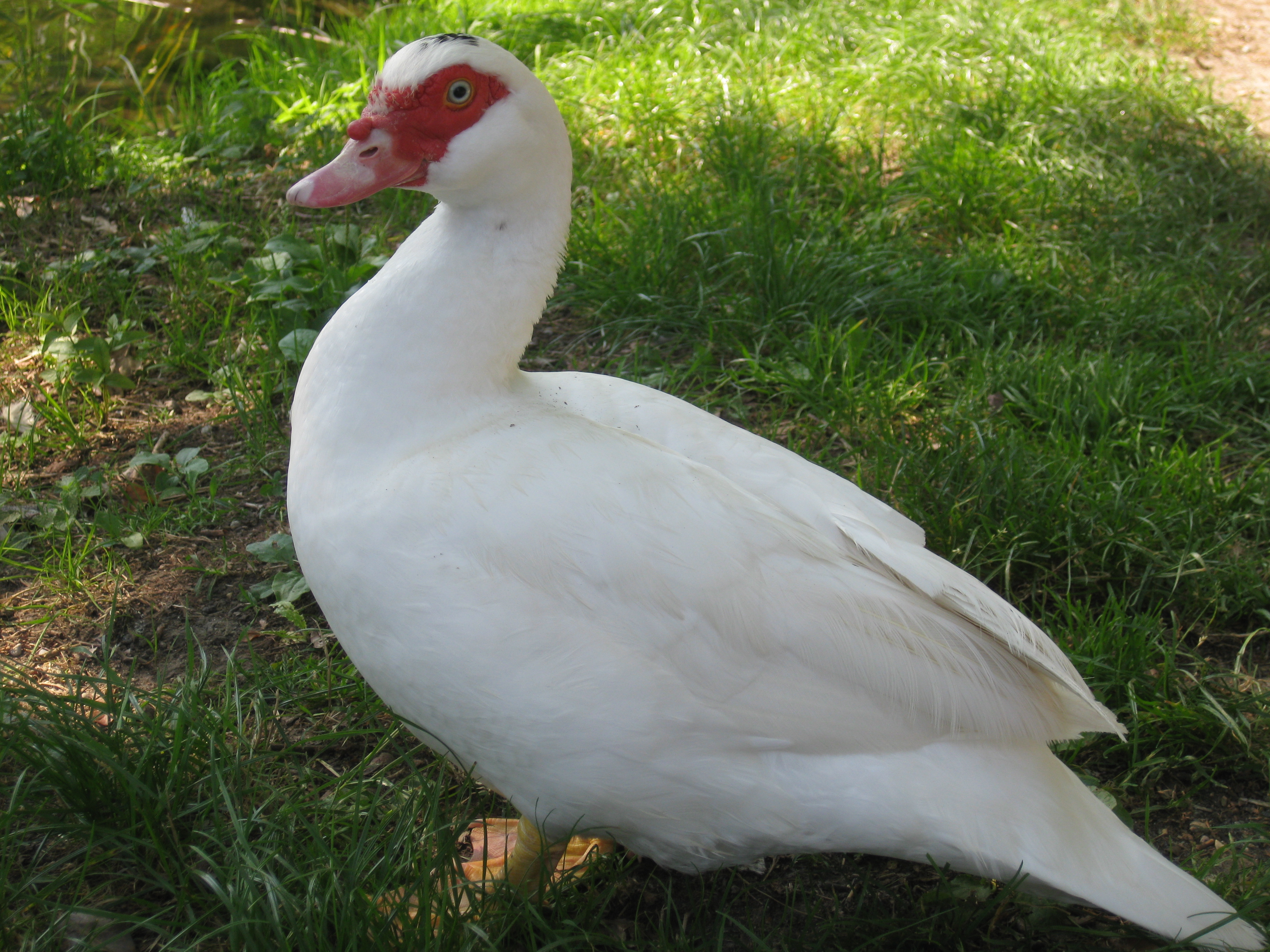
White duck

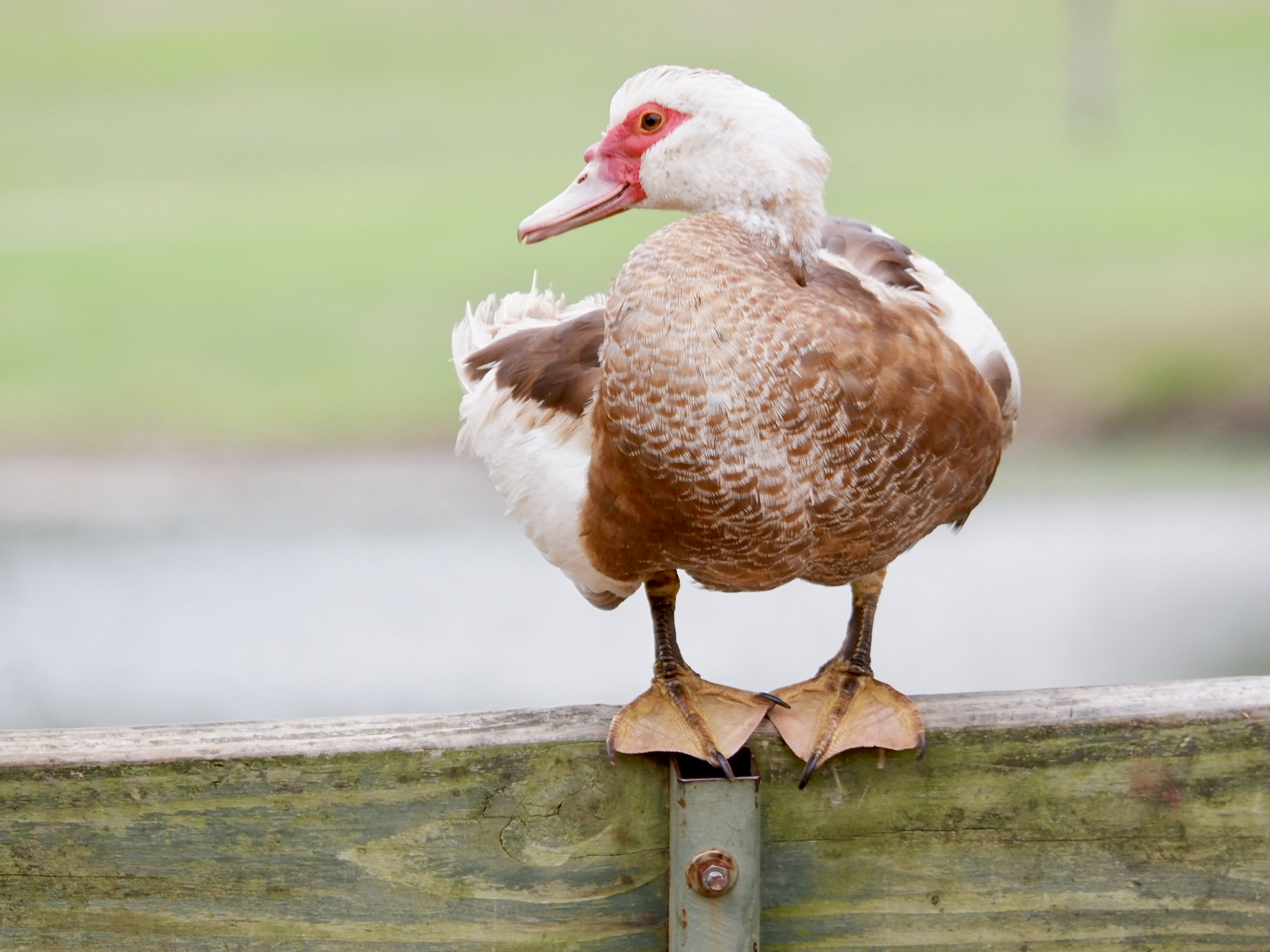
