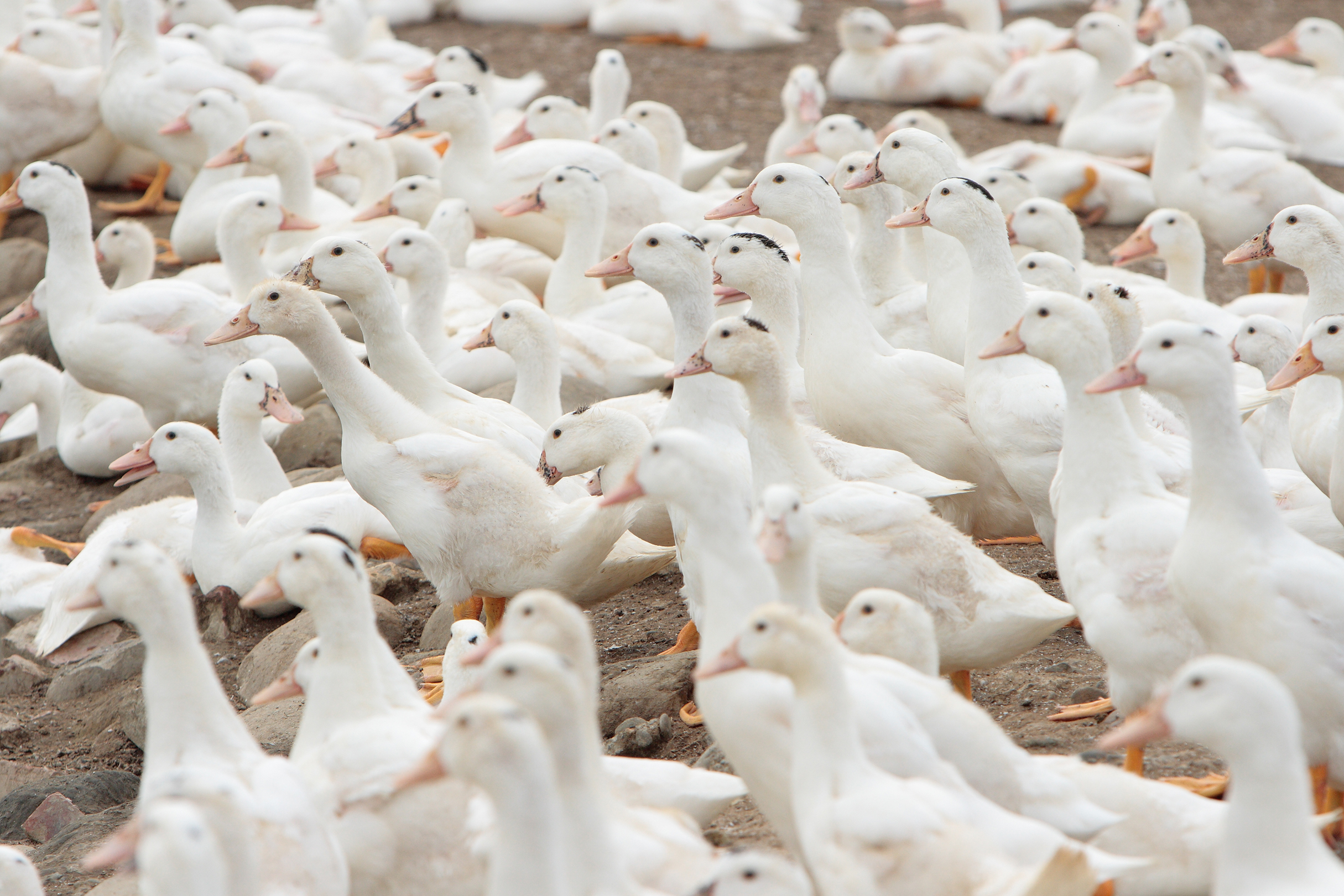
- Farm in Taiwan

Conservation status
- Domesticated

Scientific classification
- Kingdom: Animalia
- Phylum: Chordata
- Class: Aves
- Order: Anseriformes
- Family: Anatidae
- Genus: Anas
- Species: A. platyrhynchos
- Subspecies: A. p. domesticus

Trinomial name
- Anas platyrhynchos domesticus Linnaeus, 1758

= Domestic duck =

Domestic mallard Temporal range: Holocene 2,000BC-Present

Type of poultry

Domestic Muscovy Temporal range: Holocene – present
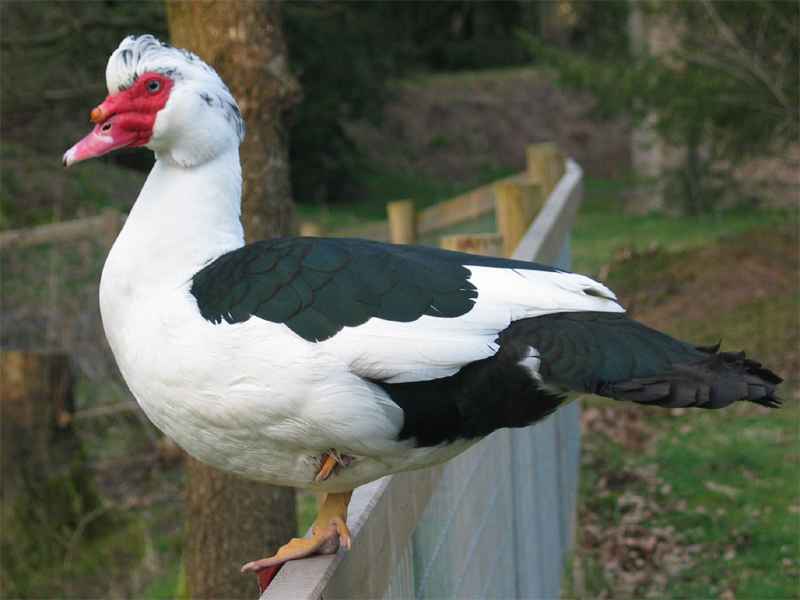

Conservation status
- Domesticated

Scientific classification
- Kingdom: Animalia
- Phylum: Chordata
- Class: Aves
- Order: Anseriformes
- Family: Anatidae
- Genus: Cairina
- Species: C. moschata
- Subspecies: C. m. domestica

Trinomial name
- Cairina moschata domestica (Linnaeus, 1758)

A domesticated duck in Japan

Domestic ducks (mainly mallards, Anas platyrhynchos domesticus, with some Muscovy ducks, Cairina moschata domestica) are ducks that have been domesticated and raised for meat and eggs. A few are kept for show, or for their ornamental value. Domesticated ducks are descended mainly from the mallard, which was domesticated in China around 2000 BC, with contributions from the Muscovy duck.

Duck farming is simplified by their reliable flocking behaviour, and their ability to forage effectively for themselves. Over 80% of global duck production is in China. Breeds such as White Pekin are raised for meat, while the prolific Indian Runner can produce over 300 eggs per year. In East and Southeast Asia, polycultures such as rice-duck farming are widely practised: the ducks assist the rice with manure and by eating small pest animals, so that the same land produces rice and ducks at once.

In culture, ducks feature in children's stories such as The Tale of Jemima Puddle-Duck, and in Sergei Prokofiev's musical composition Peter and the Wolf; they have appeared in art since the time of ancient Egypt, where they served as a fertility symbol.

== Origins ==
=== Domestication ===
Domestic mallards appear from whole-genome sequencing to have originated from a single domestication event of mallards during the Neolithic, followed by rapid selection for lineages favouring meat or egg production. They were probably domesticated in Southern China around 2000 BC (before the southward expansion of the Han dynasty) – by the rice paddy-farming ancestors of modern Southeast Asians – and spread outwards from that region. There are few archaeological records, so the date of domestication is unknown; the earliest written records are in Han Chinese writings from central China dating to about 500& BC. Duck farming for both meat and eggs is a widespread and ancient industry in Southeast Asia.

Wild mallard ducks were hunted extensively in Egypt and other parts of the world in ancient times, but were not domesticated. Ducks are documented in Ancient Rome from the second century BC, but descriptions – such as by Lucius Columella – suggest that ducks in Roman agriculture were captured in the wild, not domesticated; there was no duck breeding in Roman times, so eggs from wild ducks were needed to start duck farms.

The Muscovy duck was domesticated in Mexico and South America.

=== Origins of breeds ===
Most breeds and varieties of domestic duck derive from the mallard, Anas platyrhynchos; a few derive from Cairina moschata, the Muscovy duck, or are mulards, hybrids of these with A. platyrhynchos stock. Domestication has greatly altered their characteristics. Domestic ducks are mostly promiscuous, where wild mallards are monogamous. Domestic ducks have lost the mallard's territorial behaviour, and are less aggressive than mallards. Despite these differences, domestic ducks frequently mate with wild mallard, producing fully fertile hybrid offspring. A wild mallard weighs some 1.1 kg (2.4 lb), but large breeds like the Aylesbury may weigh 4.6 kg (10 lb) (and hybrids even more), while small breeds like the Appleyard may be only 0.7 kg (1.5 lb). Those breeds are raised for meat and eggs, while other breeds are purely ornamental, having been selected for their crests, tufts, or striking plumage, for exhibition in competitions.

A phylogenomic analysis found that Indian breeds of ducks formed a cluster that was sister to the White Pekin duck (a breed derived from ducks domesticated in China), while Muscovy ducks are from another genus.

Phylogeny of some breeds of duck

- part of Anatidae
  - Cairina moschata
    Muscovy duck
  - Mallard Anas platyrhynchos
    - Other breeds
    - - White Pekin
      - - Assam duck
        - Other Indian breeds (Kuttanad, Keeri, Sanyasi)

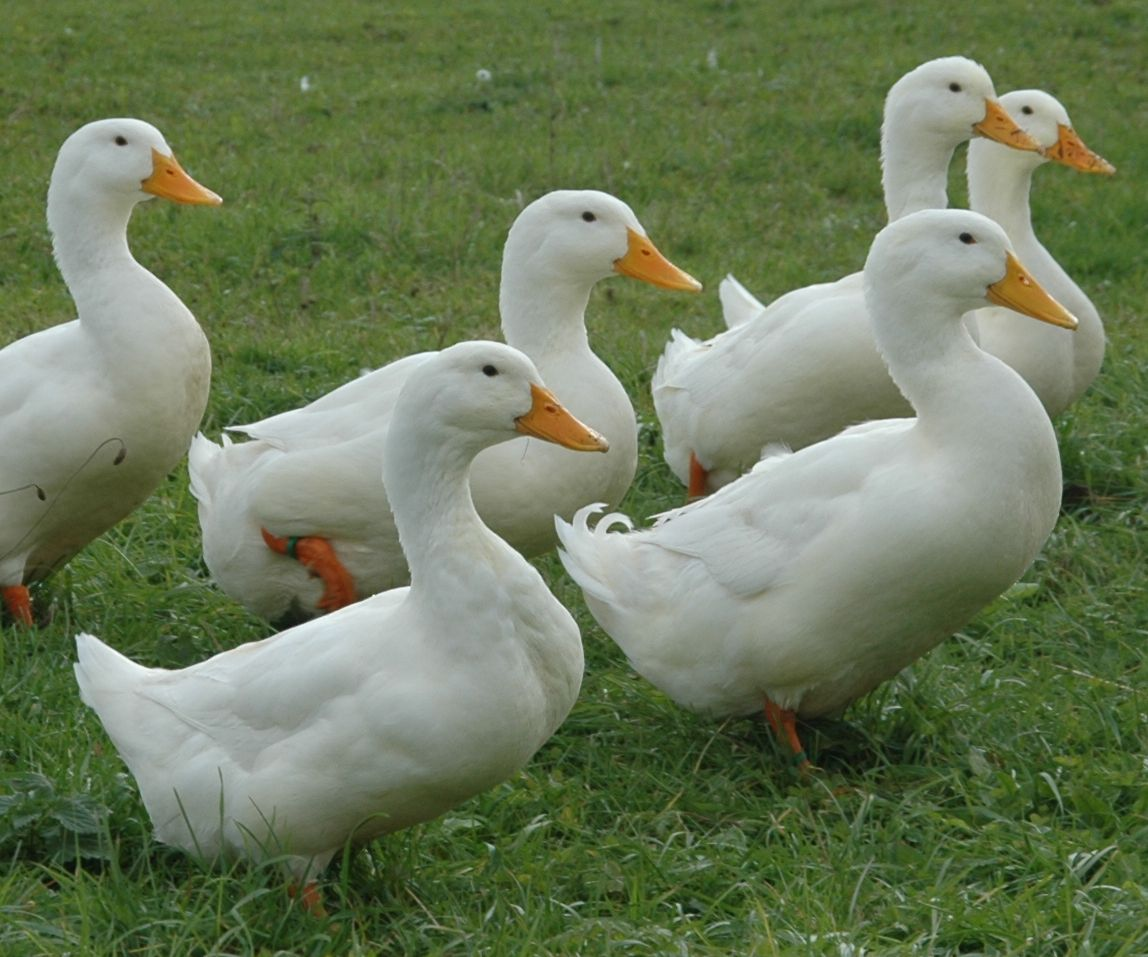
White Pekins are raised for meat.

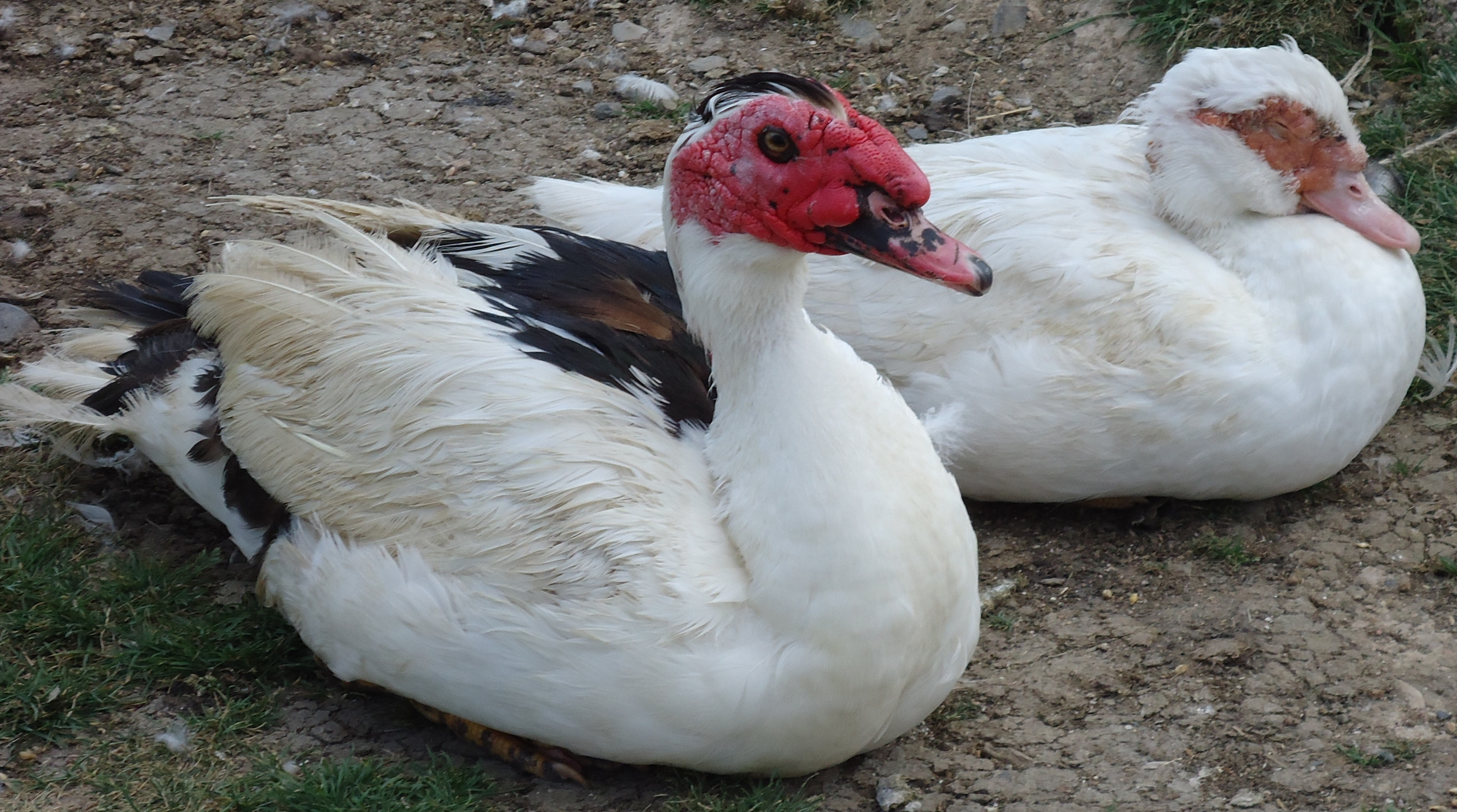
Muscovy ducks produce a richly-flavoured meat, and are kept as pets.

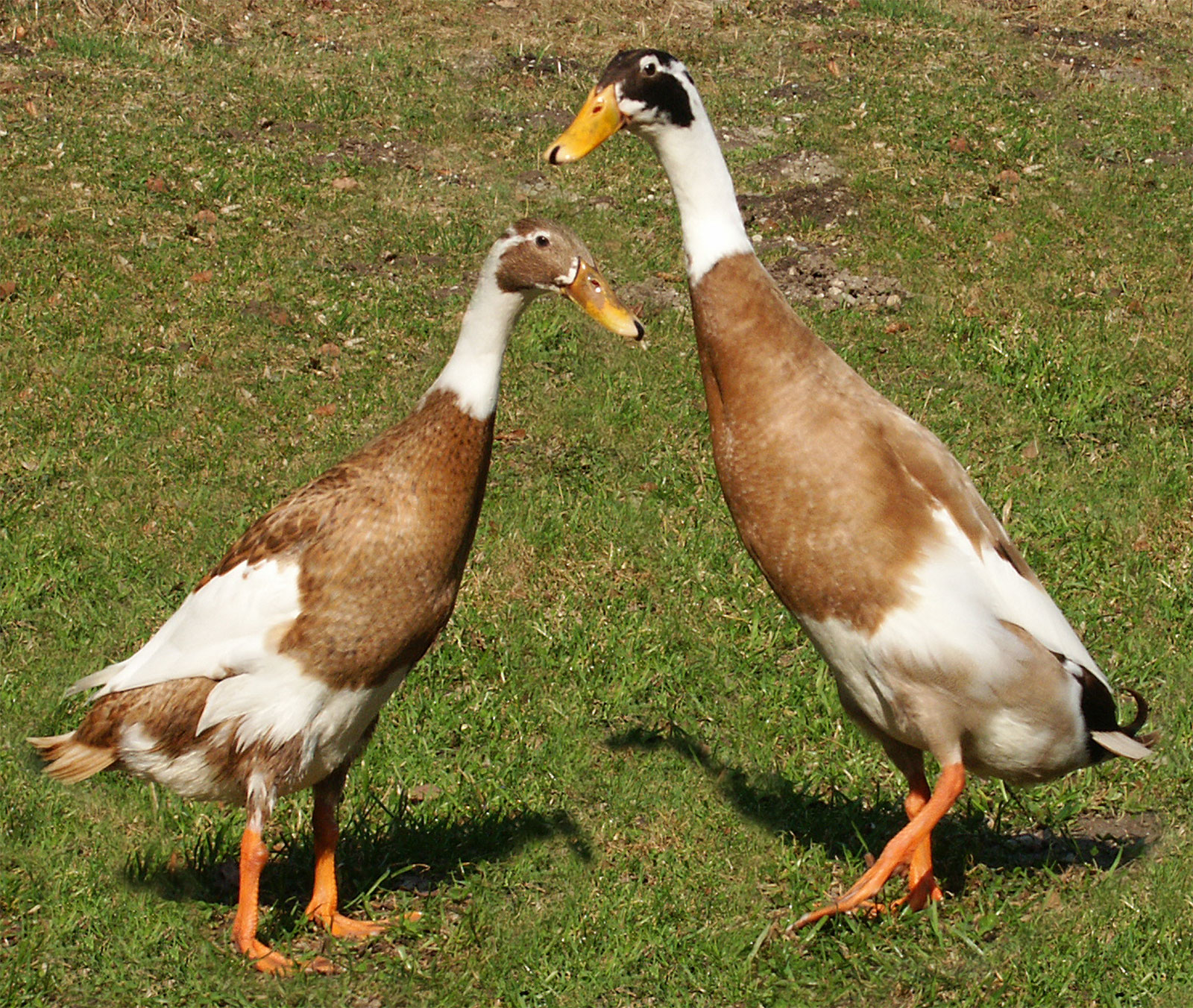
Indian Runner ducks stand upright, do not fly, and may produce over 300 eggs per year.

== Farming ==
=== Husbandry ===
Ducks have been farmed for thousands of years. They are reared principally for meat, but also for duck eggs. Duck husbandry is simplified by aspects of their behaviour, including reliable flocking and the ability to forage effectively for themselves in wetlands and water bodies. Domestic ducks have a potential lifespan of some 8 to 12 years in captivity.

Most breeds of duck may lay some 200 eggs per year, though the Indian Runner may produce over 300 eggs annually. The females of many breeds of domestic duck are unreliable at sitting their eggs and raising their young. Exceptions include the Rouen duck and especially the Muscovy duck. It has been a custom on farms for centuries to put duck eggs under broody hens for hatching; nowadays this role is often played by an incubator. However, young ducklings rely on their mothers for a supply of preen oil to make them waterproof; a chicken does not make as much preen oil as a duck, and an incubator makes none. Once the duckling grows its own feathers, it produces preen oil from the sebaceous gland near the base of its tail.

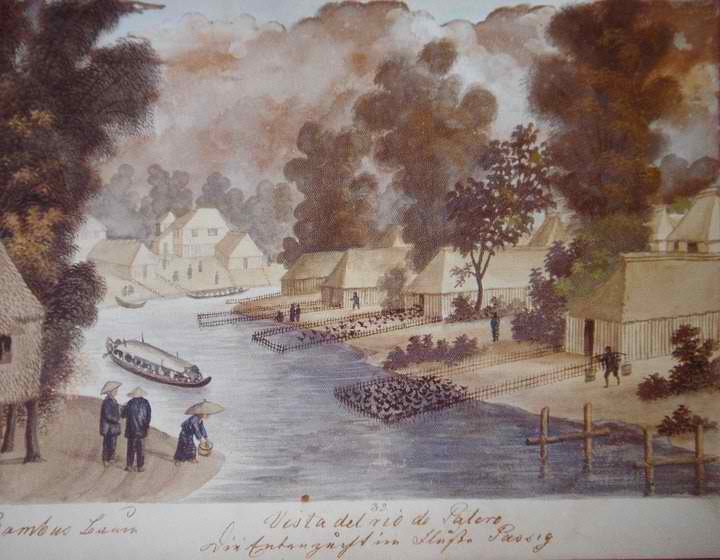
Painting by José Honorato Lozano of duck farms along the Pasig River in the Philippines, 1821

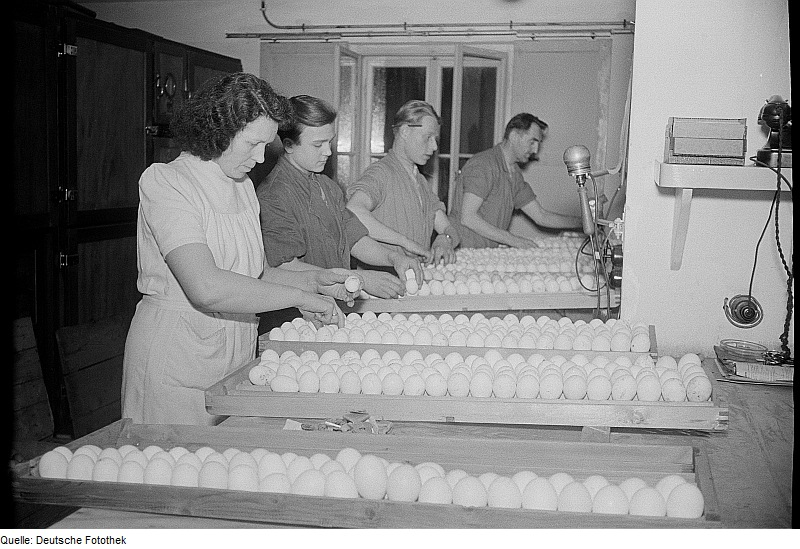
Turning duck eggs in front of incubators, Germany, 1952

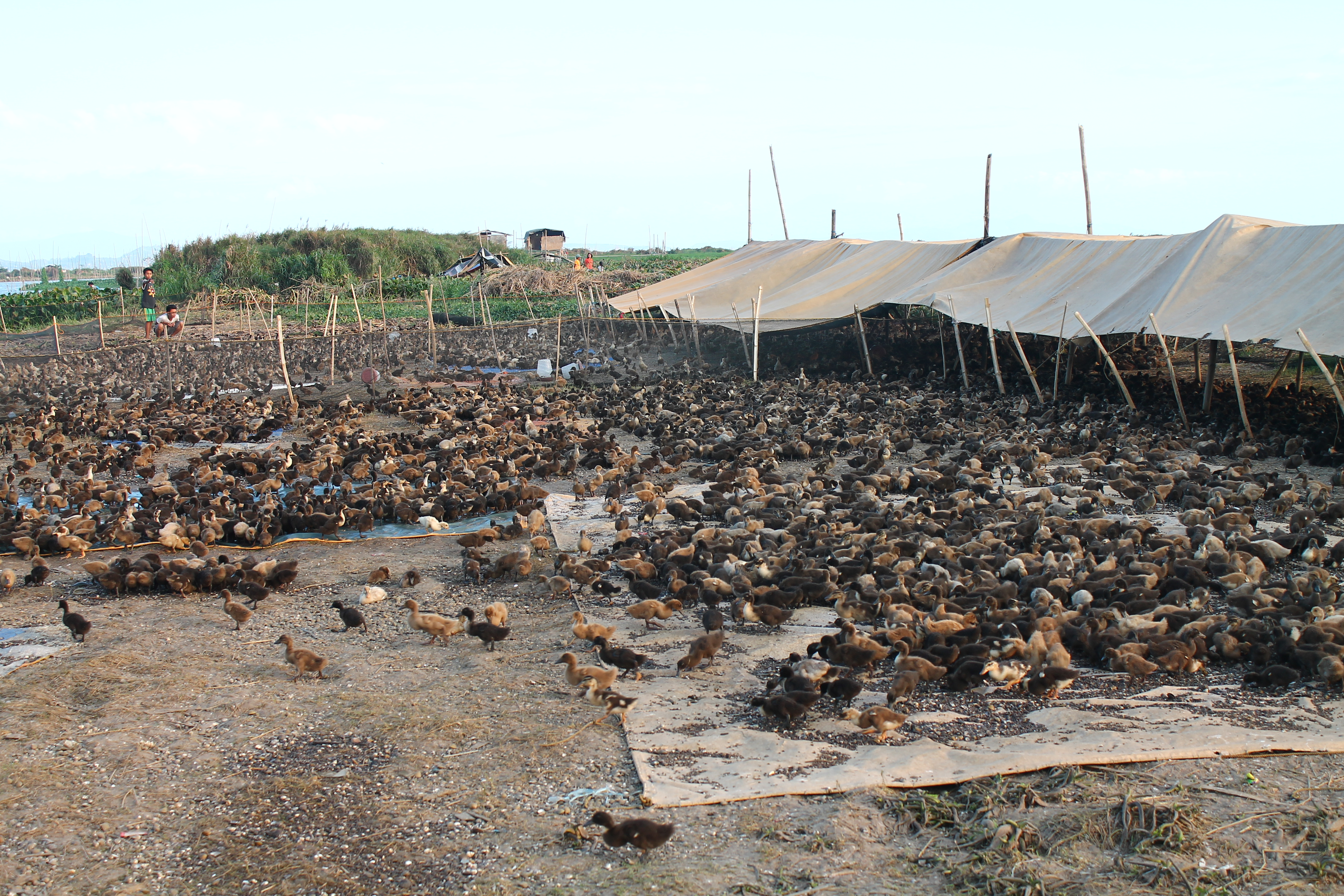
Duck farm in the Philippines, 2014

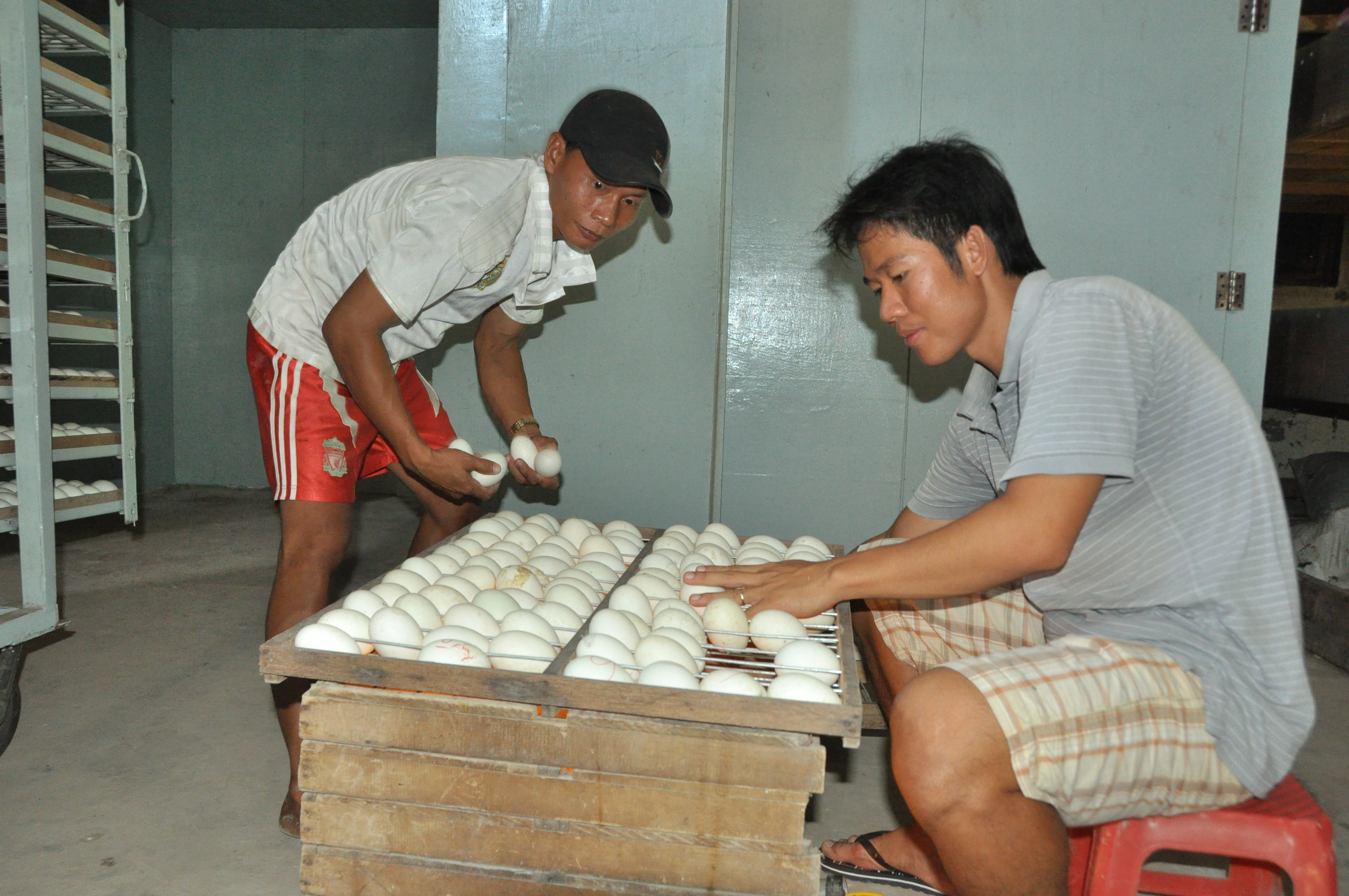
Inspecting duck eggs at a hatchery, Vietnam, 2014

=== Systems ===
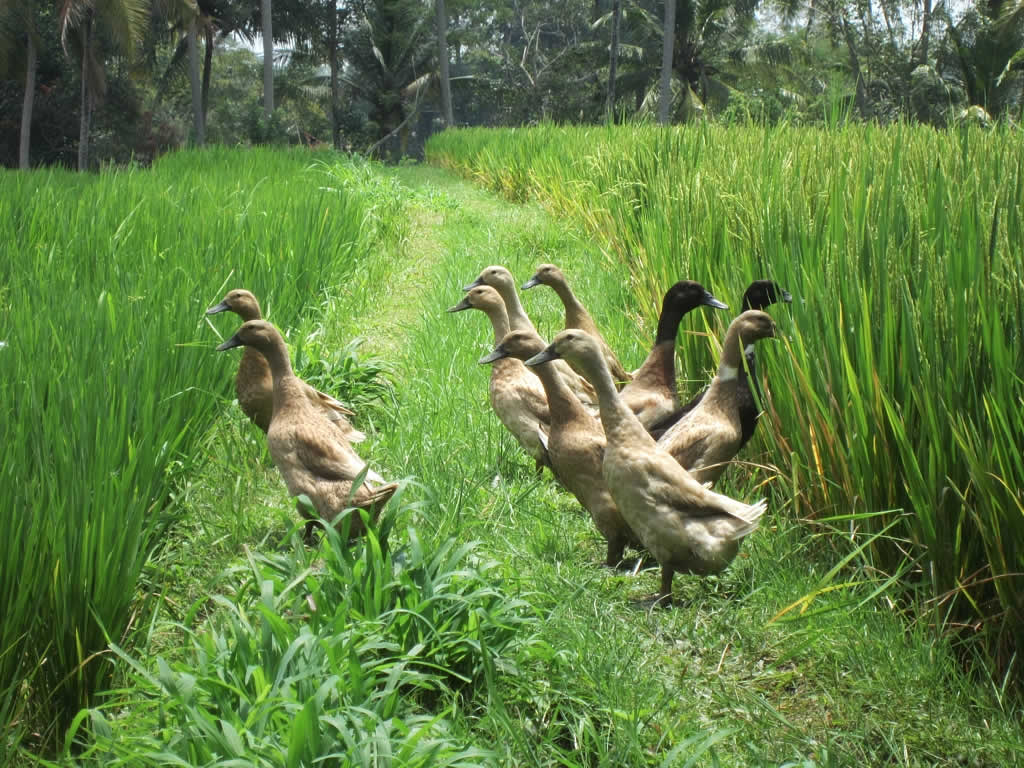
Ducks with free access to rice paddies in Bali, Indonesia provide additional income and manure the fields, reducing the need for fertilizer.

In East and Southeast Asia, rice-duck farming is widely practised. This polyculture yields both rice and ducks from the same land; the ducks eat small pest animals in the crop; they stir the water, limiting weeds, and manure the rice. Other rice polycultures in the region include rice-fish-duck and rice-fish-duck-azolla systems, where fish further manure the rice and help to control pests.

=== Pests and diseases ===
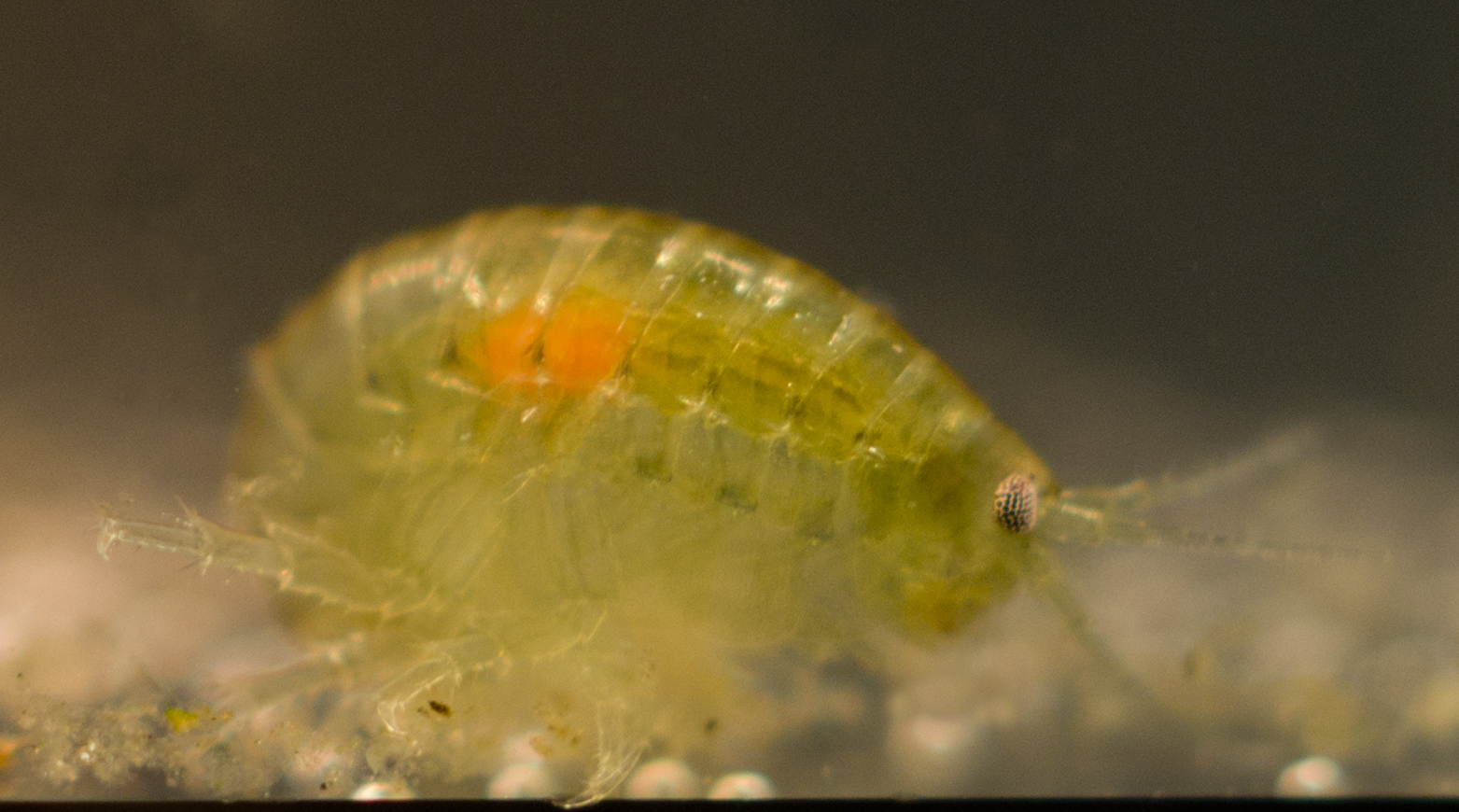
A freshwater shrimp with an acanthocephalan (orange) in its body cavity. Ducks eat the shrimps and become infected with the parasites.

Domestic ducks have the advantage over other poultry of being strongly resistant to many bird diseases, including such serious conditions as duck plague (viral enteritis). They are however susceptible to the dangerous H5N1 strain of avian influenza. Ducks are subject to ectoparasites such as lice and endoparasites such as trematodes, cestodes, and acanthocephalans. A high parasitic load can result in a substantial reduction in the ducks' growth rate.

=== Production ===
In 2021 approximately 4.3 billion ducks were slaughtered for meat worldwide, for a total yield of about 6.2 million tonnes; over 80% of this production was in China, where more than 3.6 billion ducks were killed, yielding some 4.9 million tonnes of meat. Worldwide production of duck meat was substantially lower than that of chicken – 73.8 billion birds slaughtered, 121.6 million tonnes – but considerably greater than that of goose – about 750 million birds killed for 4.4 million tonnes of meat. Feathers are a by-product of duck farming.

== As food ==
=== Meat ===
Since ancient times, the duck has been eaten as food. Usually only the breast and thigh meat is eaten. It does not need to be hung before preparation, and is often braised or roasted, sometimes flavoured with bitter orange or with port. Peking duck is a dish of roast duck from Beijing, China, that has been prepared since medieval times. It is today traditionally served with spring pancakes, spring onions and sweet bean sauce.

=== Eggs and other products ===
In France, ducks are used for the production of foie gras de canard. In some cultures the blood of ducks slaughtered for meat is used as food; it may be eaten seasoned and lightly cooked, as in Ireland, or be used as an ingredient, as in a number of regional types of blood soup, among them the czarnina of Poland and the tiết canh of Vietnam.

Duck eggs are eaten mainly in Asian countries such as China; in the Philippines, balut – a fertilised duck egg at about 17 days of development, boiled and eaten with salt – is considered a delicacy and is sold as street food.

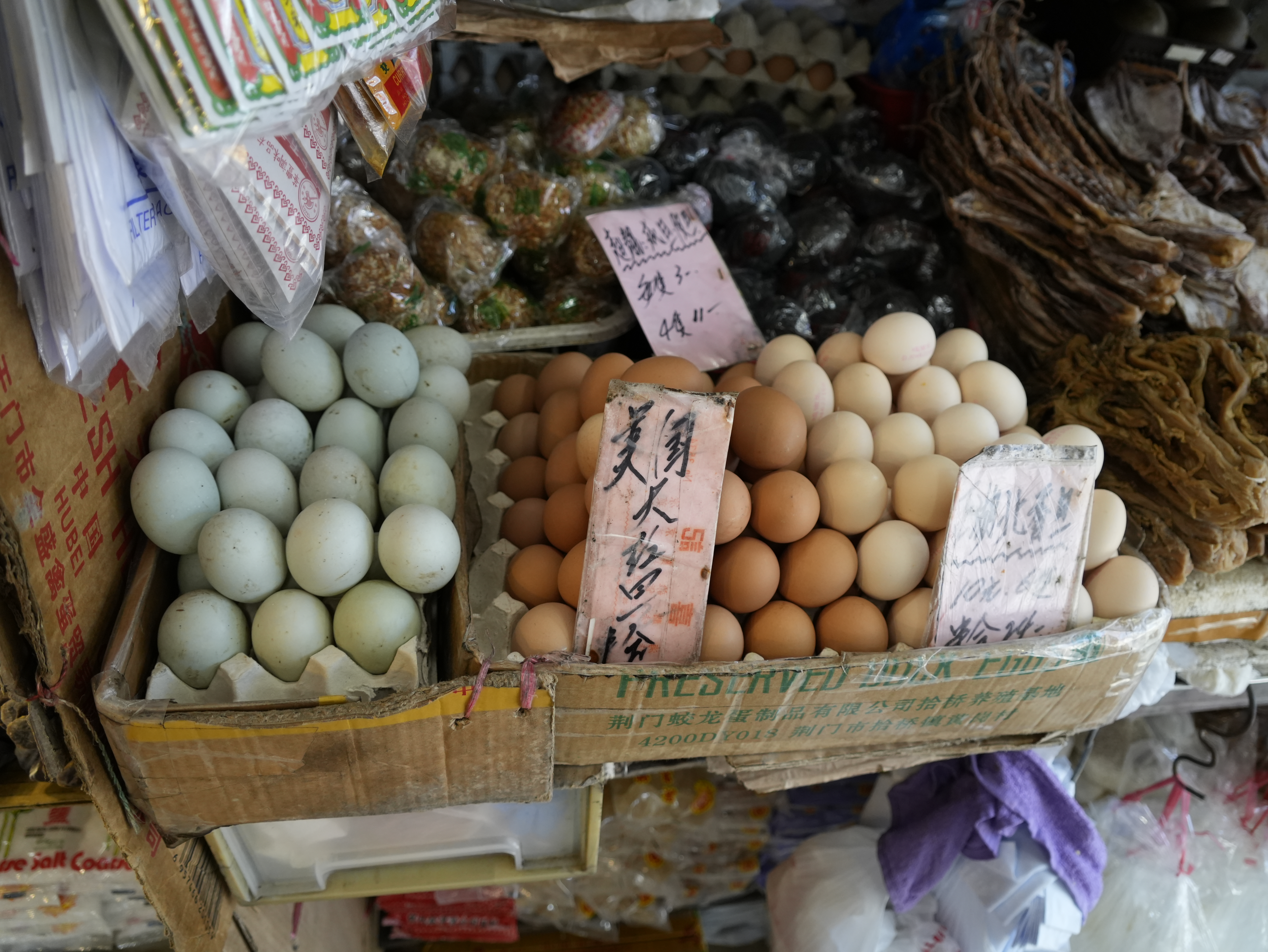
Duck eggs (left), larger and greener than chicken eggs (right) at market, Hong Kong, 2022

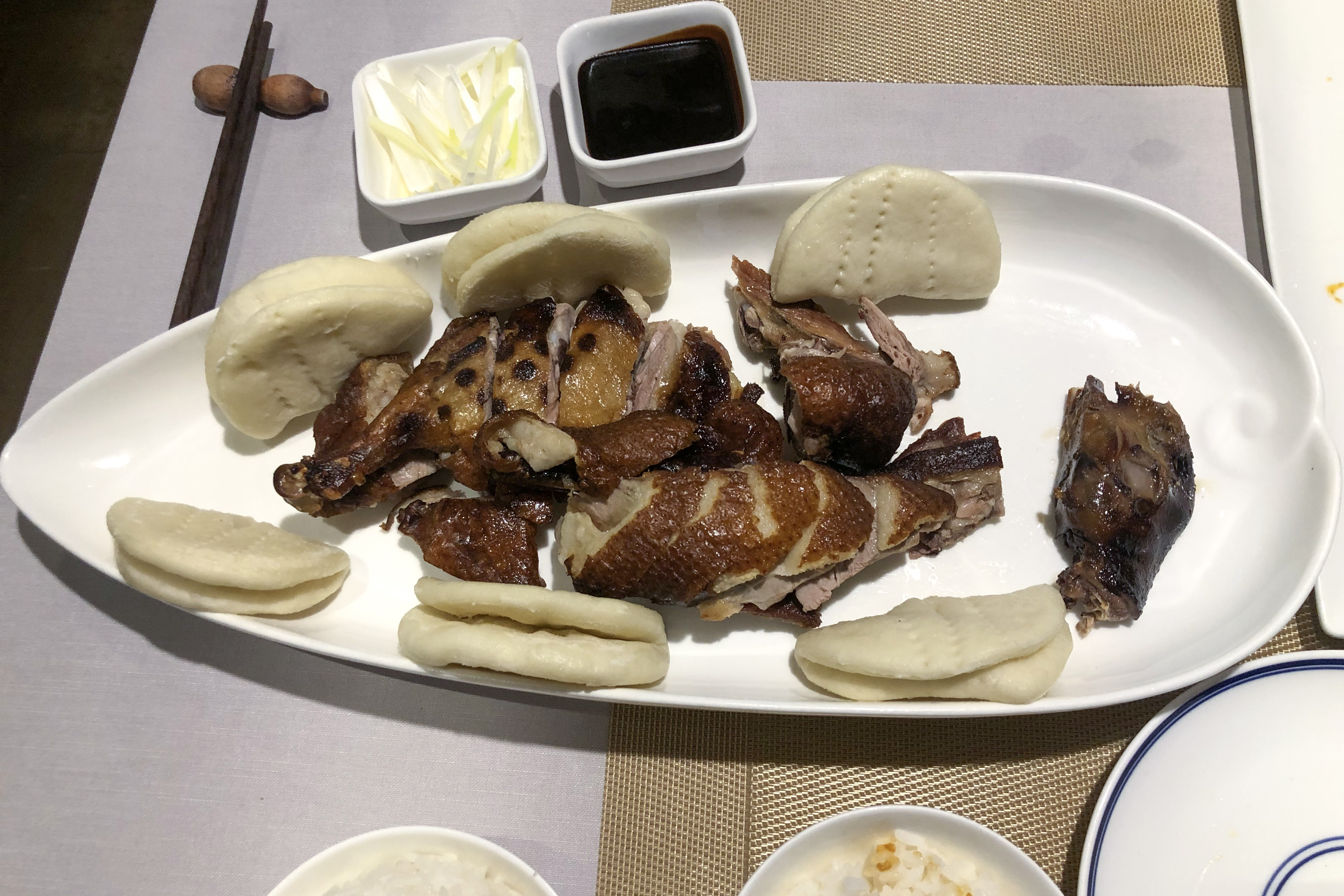
Sichuan-style tea-smoked zhangcha duck

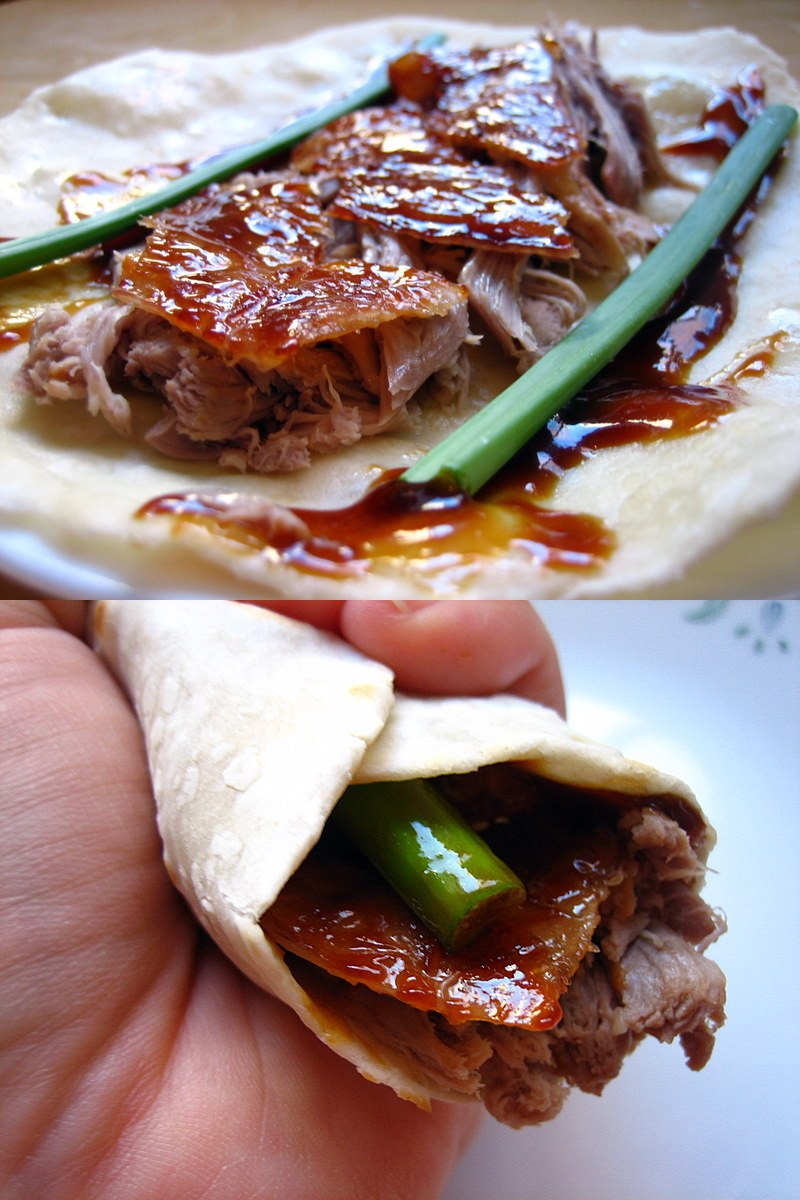
Peking duck with spring pancake

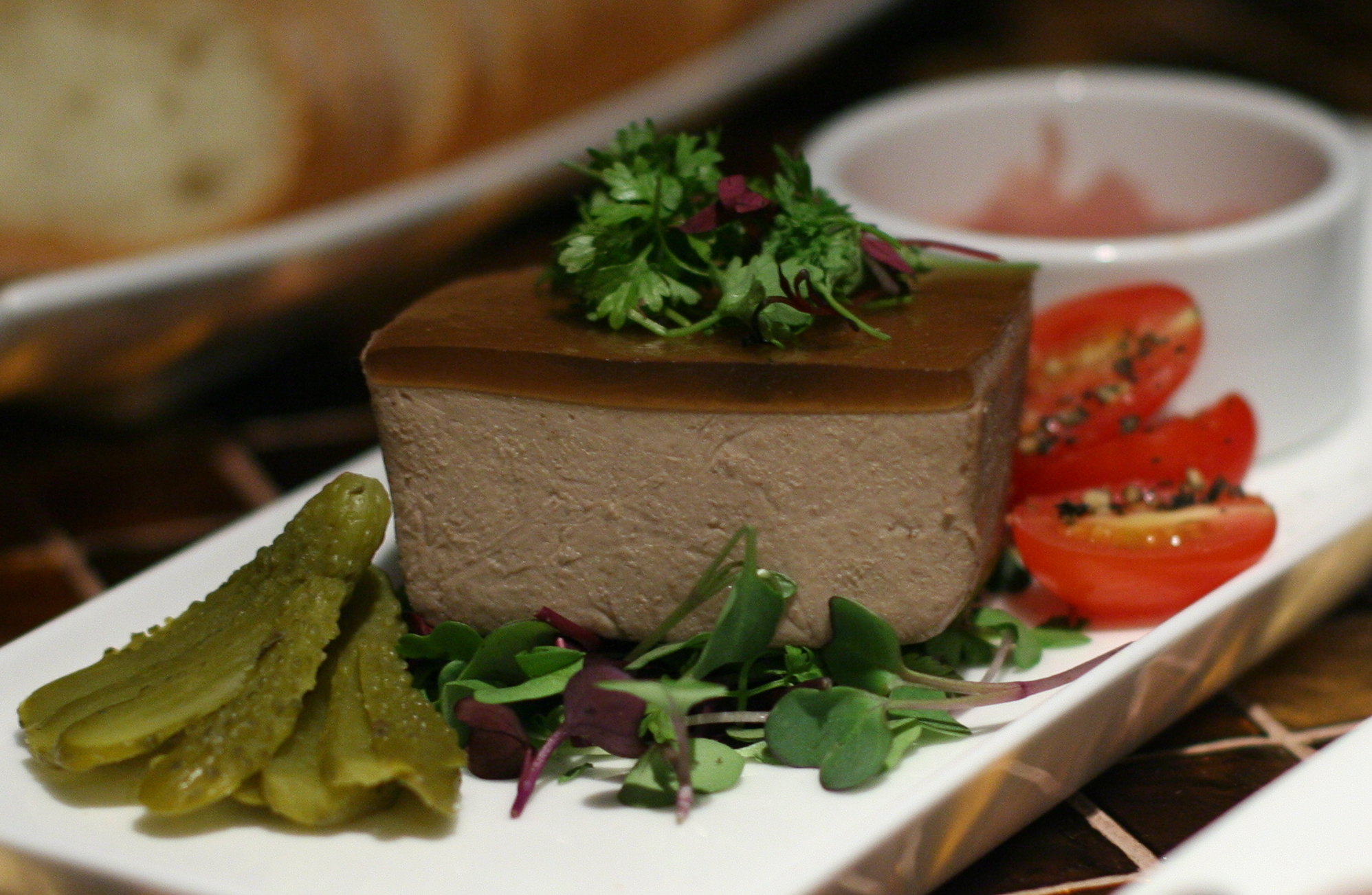
Duck liver pâté

== In culture ==
=== For children ===
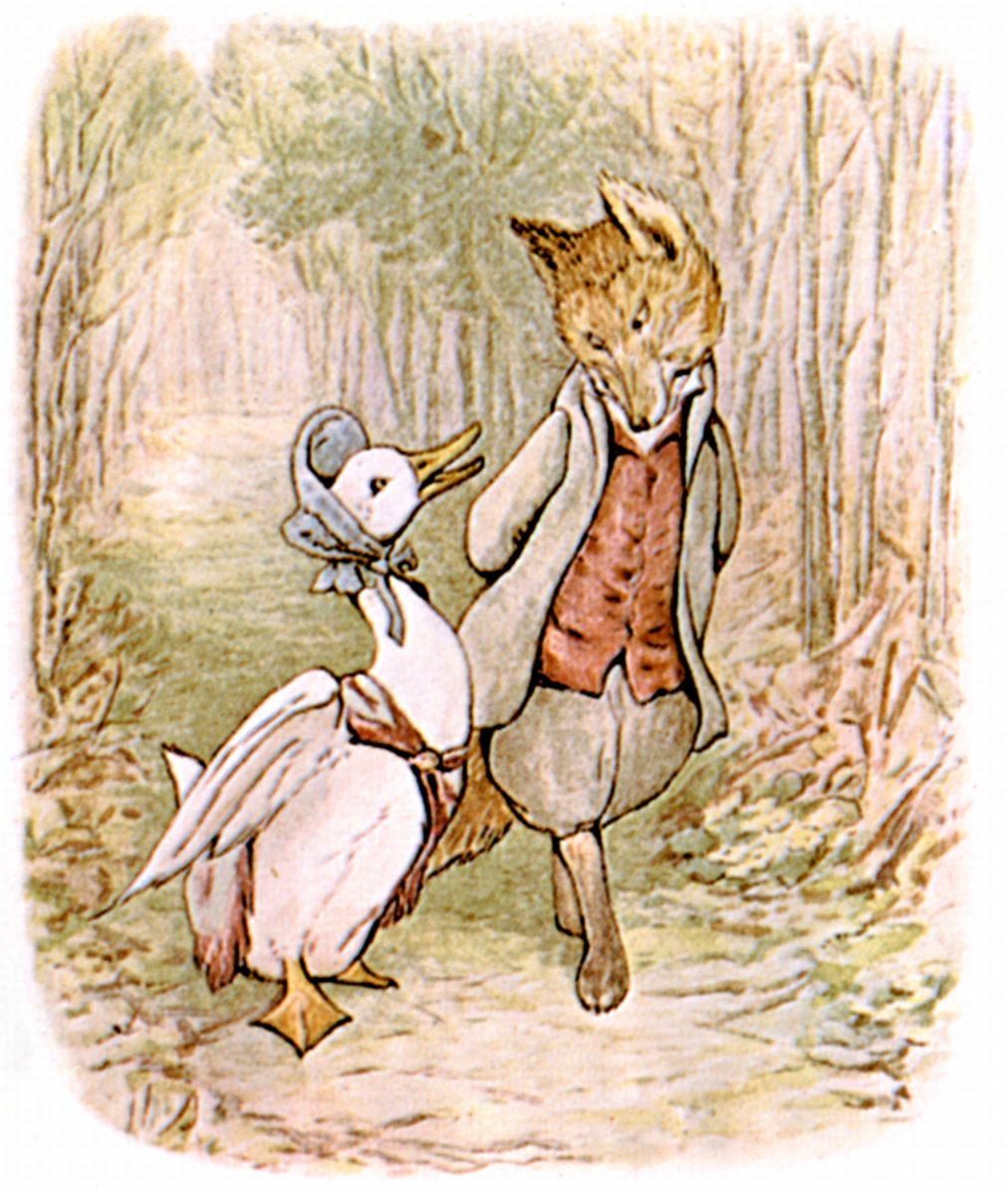
One of Beatrix Potter's illustrations for The Tale of Jemima Puddle-Duck, 1908

The domestic duck has appeared numerous times in children's stories. Beatrix Potter's The Tale of Jemima Puddle-Duck was published by Frederick Warne & Co in 1908. One of Potter's best-known books, the tale was included in the Royal Ballet's The Tales of Beatrix Potter. It is the story of how Jemima, a domestic duck, is saved from a cunning fox who plans to kill her, when she tries to find a safe place for her eggs to hatch. The Story About Ping is a 1933 American children's book by Marjorie Flack, illustrated by Kurt Wiese, about a domestic duck lost on the Yangtze River. Make Way for Ducklings, a 1941 children's picture book by Robert McCloskey, tells the story of a pair of mallards who decide to raise their family on an island in the lagoon in Boston Public Garden. It won the 1942 Caldecott Medal for its illustrations. The Disney cartoon character Donald Duck, one of the world's most recognizable pop culture icons, is a domestic duck of the American Pekin breed.

The domestic duck features in the musical composition Peter and the Wolf, written by the Russian composer Sergei Prokofiev in 1936. The orchestra illustrates the children's story while the narrator tells it. In this, a domestic duck and a little bird argue on each other's flight capabilities. The duck is represented by the oboe. The story ends with the wolf eating the duck alive, its quack heard from inside the wolf's belly.

The duck theme in Peter and the Wolf: Oboe

=== In art and folk culture ===
Domestic ducks are featured in a range of ancient artefacts, which revealed that they were a fertility symbol.

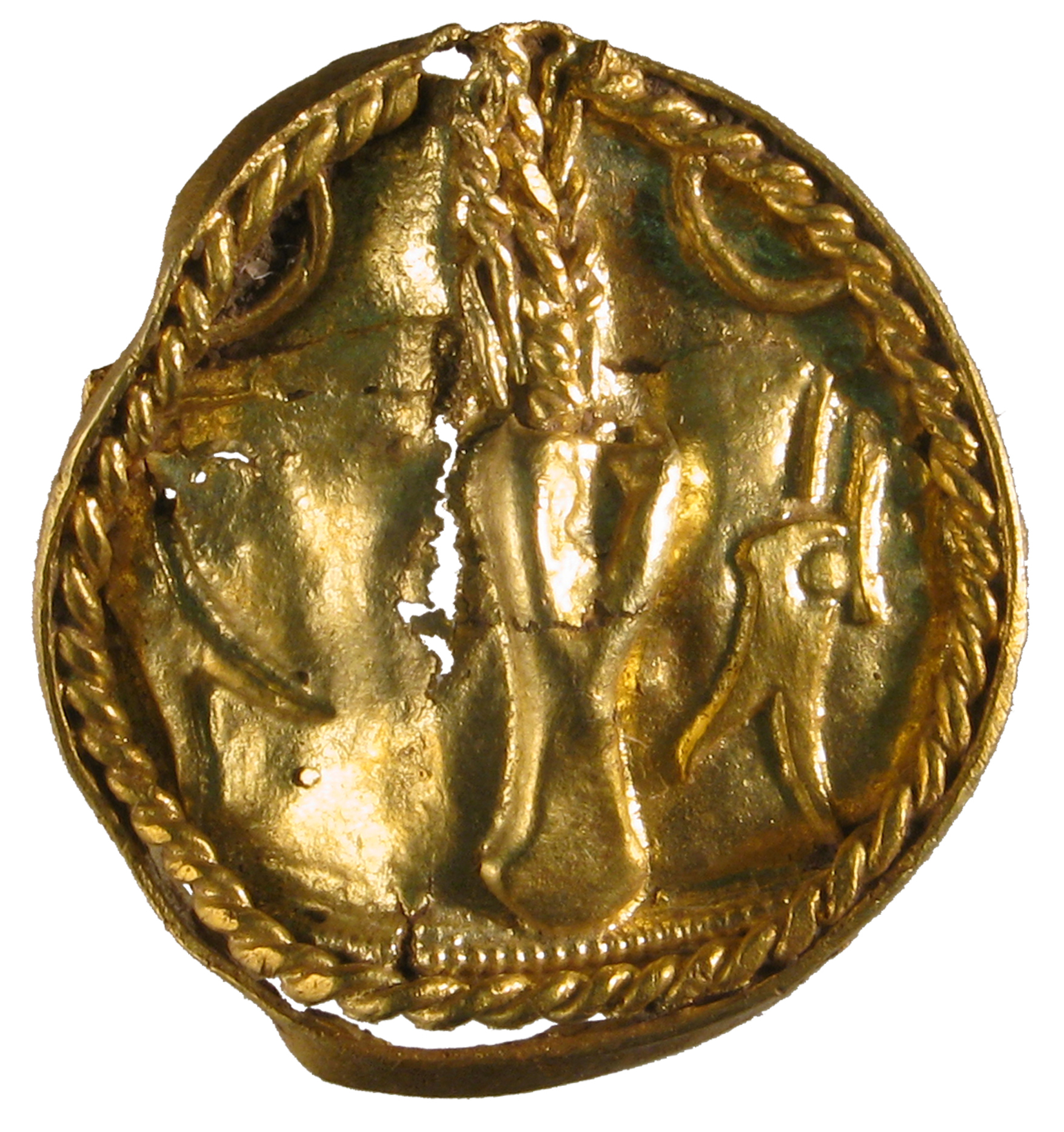
Pendant with duck's head,
England, c. 650 AD

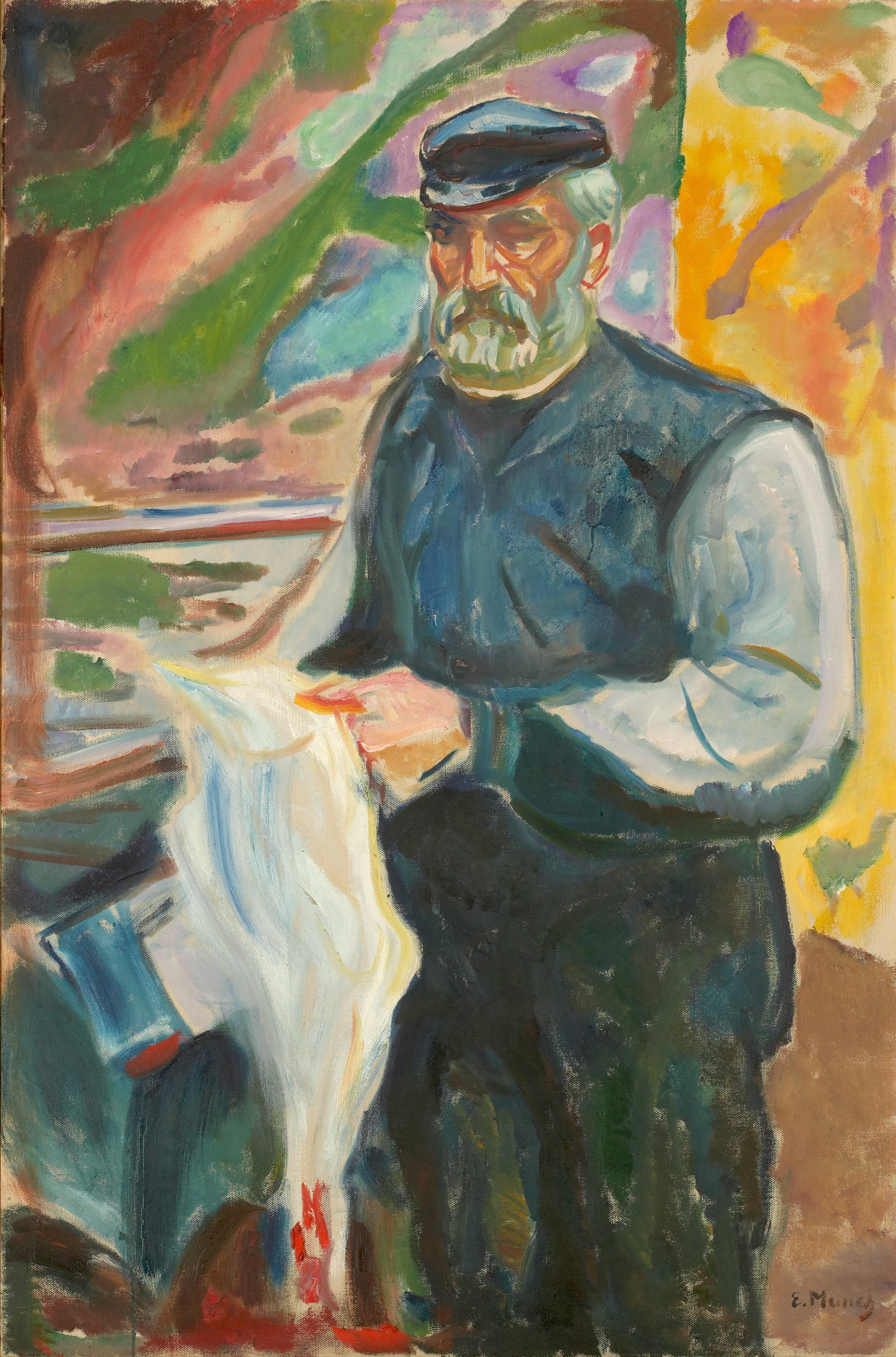
Edvard Munch's painting Jensen with Slaughtered Duck, 1912

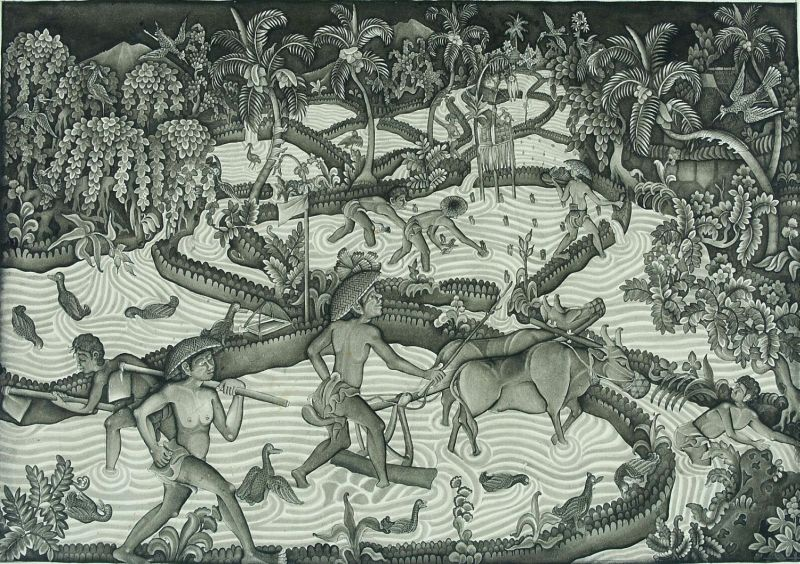
Balinese traditional painting depicting paddy fields with ducks foraging for food, 1940

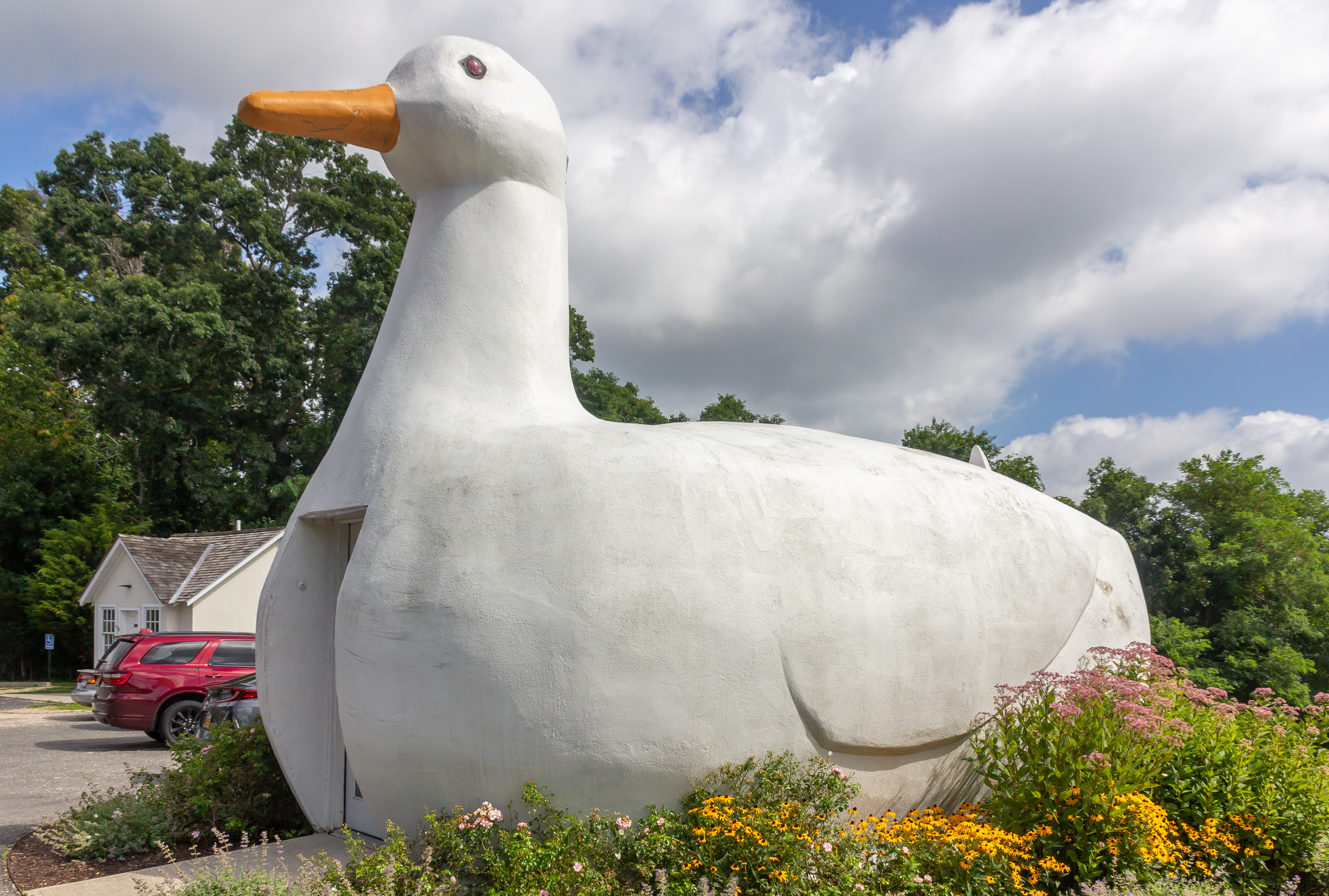
'The Big Duck', Long Island, New York: built on a duck farm, 1931
