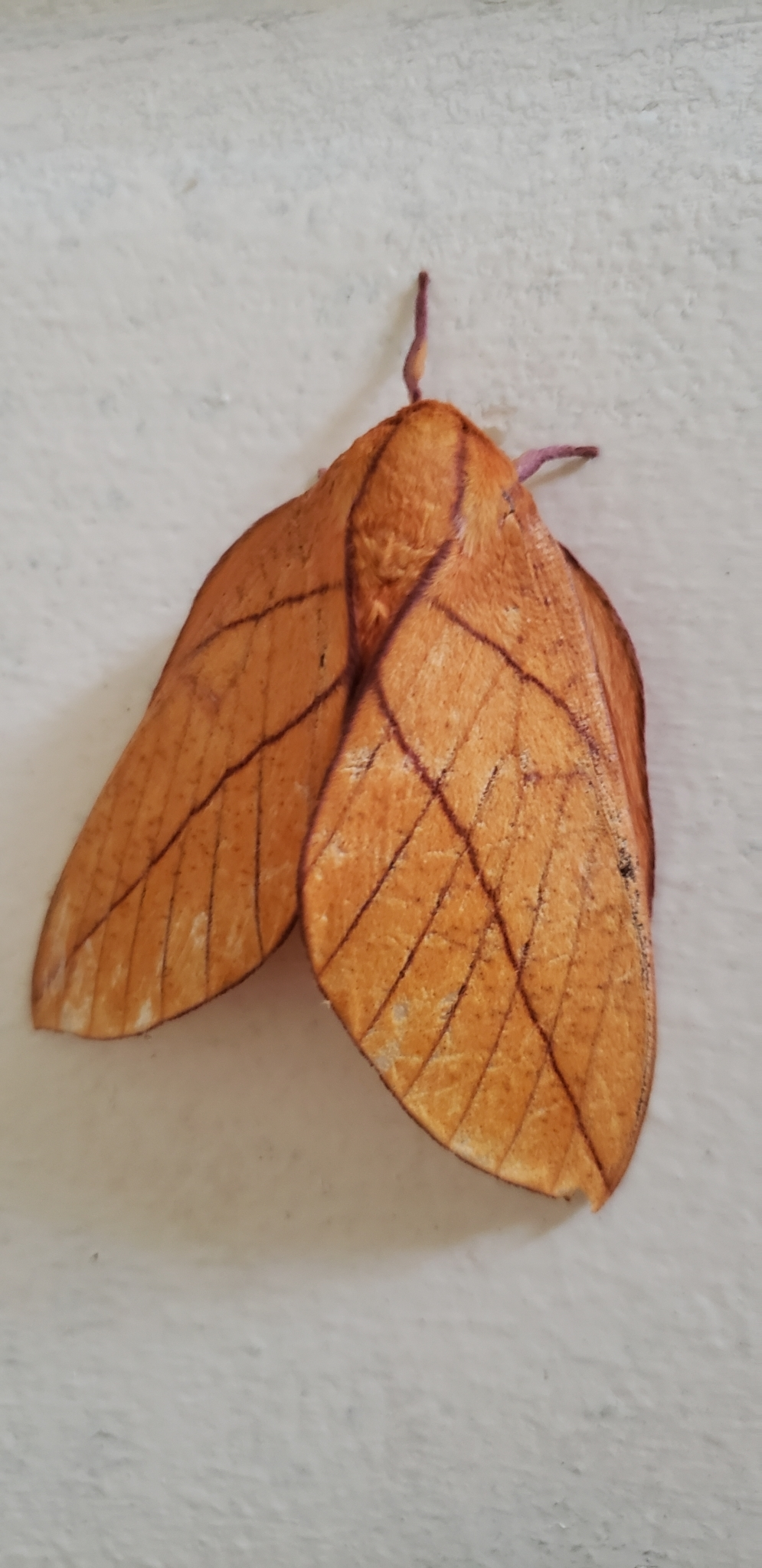

Scientific classification
- Kingdom: Animalia
- Phylum: Arthropoda
- Class: Insecta
- Order: Lepidoptera
- Family: Saturniidae
- Genus: Adeloneivaia
- Species: A. jason

Binomial name
- Adeloneivaia jason (Boisduval, 1872)

= Adeloneivaia jason =

Species of moth

Adeloneivaia jason is a species of saturniid moth found in South America. The species was originally described by Jean Baptiste Boisduval in 1872.

== Description ==
Adeloneivaia jason is a bright orange-yellow moth that occurs in central and South American rain forests. The moth can also be observed near the lower cloud lines of the volcanos. In its adult stage the moth lives between six and ten days without feeding. The species lays big yellow eggs on Inga leaves, which hatch after six days. It grows through three Instars in about 6 weeks. A month later the adult moth appears.

== Host ==
Inga trees, notably the Inga vera hosts A. jason.

== Distribution ==
The range of Adeloneivaia jason has been documented from Mexico to Colombia and Brazil, with notable observations in Venezuela. This has been verified by recent crowd-sourced observations.
