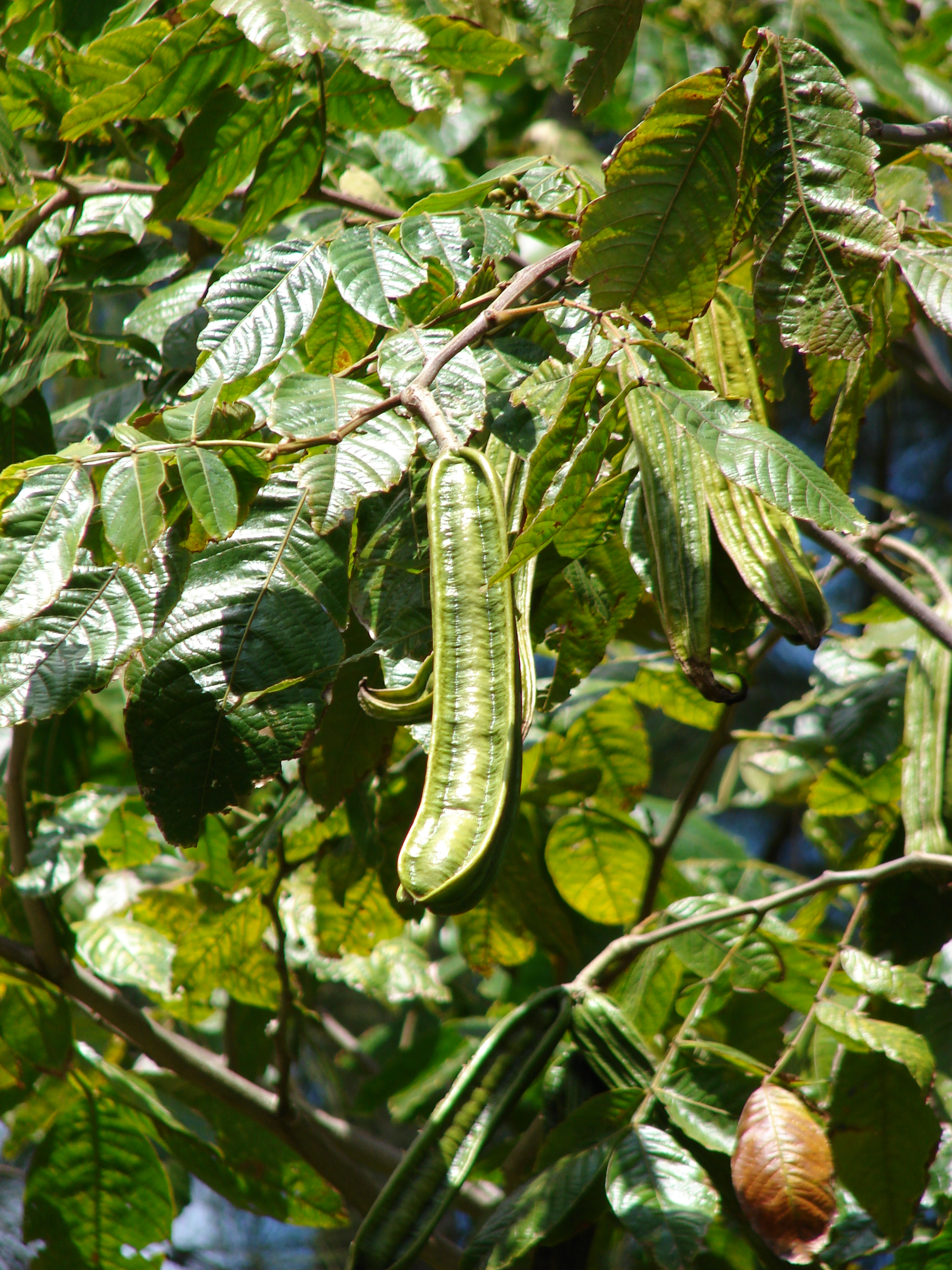
- Leaves and fruits

Scientific classification
- Kingdom: Plantae
- Clade: Tracheophytes
- Clade: Angiosperms
- Clade: Eudicots
- Clade: Rosids
- Order: Fabales
- Family: Fabaceae
- Subfamily: Caesalpinioideae
- Clade: Mimosoid clade
- Genus: Inga
- Species: I. feuilleei

Binomial name
- Inga feuilleei DC.

Synonyms
- Inga cumingiana Benth; Inga edulis sensu auct. (misapplied)

= Inga feuilleei =

Species of tree

Inga feuilleei (named after Louis Feuillée), commonly known as pacay or ice-cream bean tree, is a tree in the family Fabaceae native to Andean valleys of northwestern South America. Pacay trees, as is the case with other trees in genus Inga, produce pods that contain an edible white pulp and have nitrogen-fixing roots.

== Description ==
Pacay is a medium- to large-sized tree up to 18 m (59 ft) tall. Indumentum of pubescent hairs with rusty color on young branchlets, leaf rhachis and inflorescences. Leaves have 3-5 pairs of oblong-elliptic leaflets, with a terminal leaflet of ca. 10–20 cm long. Inflorescences in spikes to 3 cm long. Pods, flat, 20 cm long or more.

In English, they have been called "ice-cream beans" due to the sweet flavor and smooth texture of the pulp. Naturally growing Inga trees produce abundant root nodules, which fix nitrogen, thus adding nitrogen to the soil rather than taking it away, hence benefitting the land by increasing fertility levels. I. feuilleei is a legume tree that can reach an average of 60 feet or taller and withstand temperatures as high as 30°C when mature. At low temperatures, these trees are often damaged. These trees generally occur near riverbanks, so it has year-round irrigation. Inga species are dependable, producing fruit in abundance and providing sustenance in bad times. A family can produce food without occupying the farmland used for food crops, because they can grow on sites neglected by agriculture. They grow rapidly, are tolerant of diverse soils, and are resistant to disease and fire. These trees are easy to establish, spread their shade quickly, and provide fruit for years. The fruits of the trees are quite edible and are often consumed by people of regions where this fruit grows. In Mexico, coffee-plantation workers can double their annual salary by selling the pods from the Inga trees used to shade the coffee plants. In Central America, the seeds are cooked and eaten as a vegetable. In Mexico, the seeds are roasted and sold outside theaters to moviegoers. In Costa Rica, the fruit is also known as guaba.

== Gallery ==
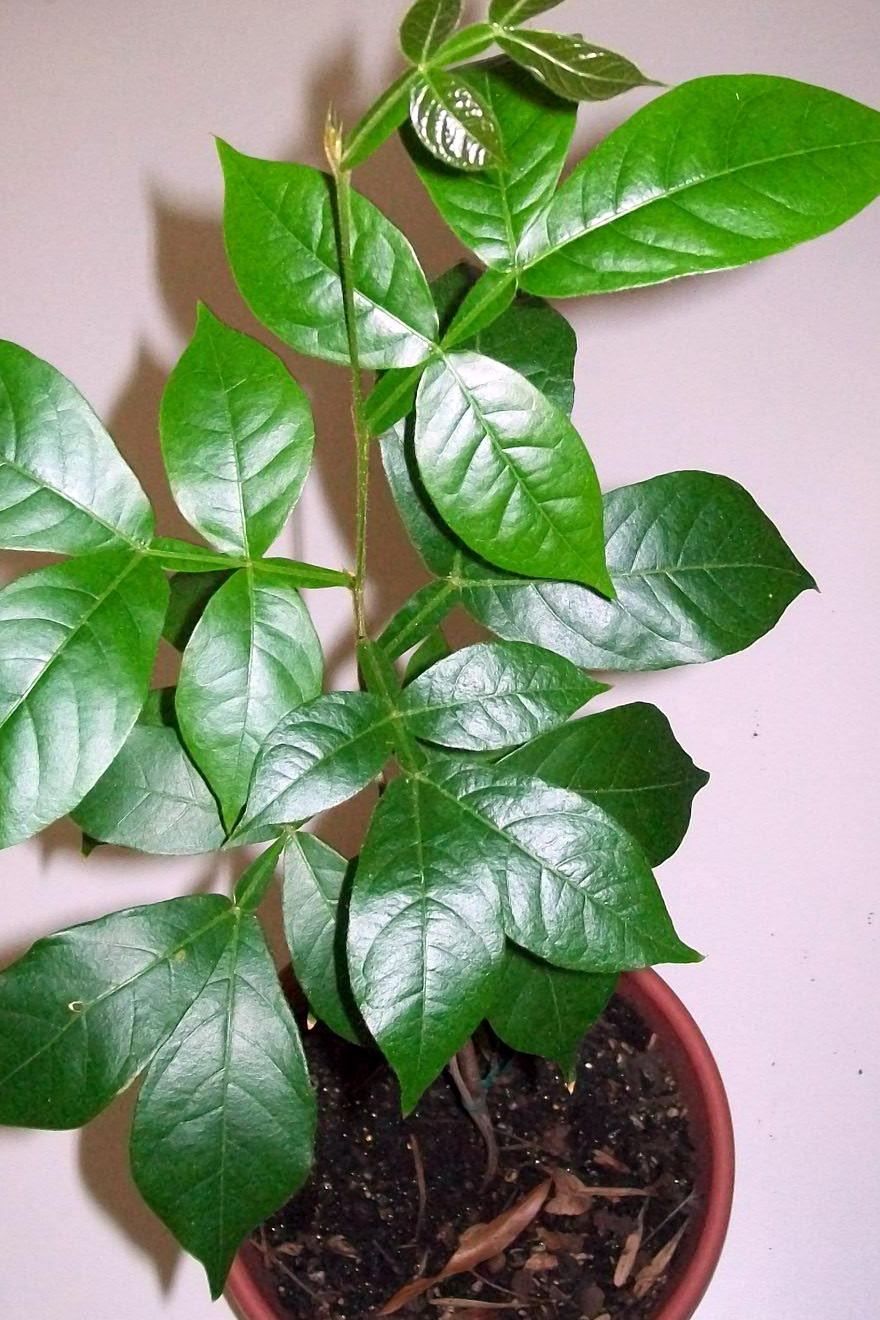
Pacay Seedling 1 year

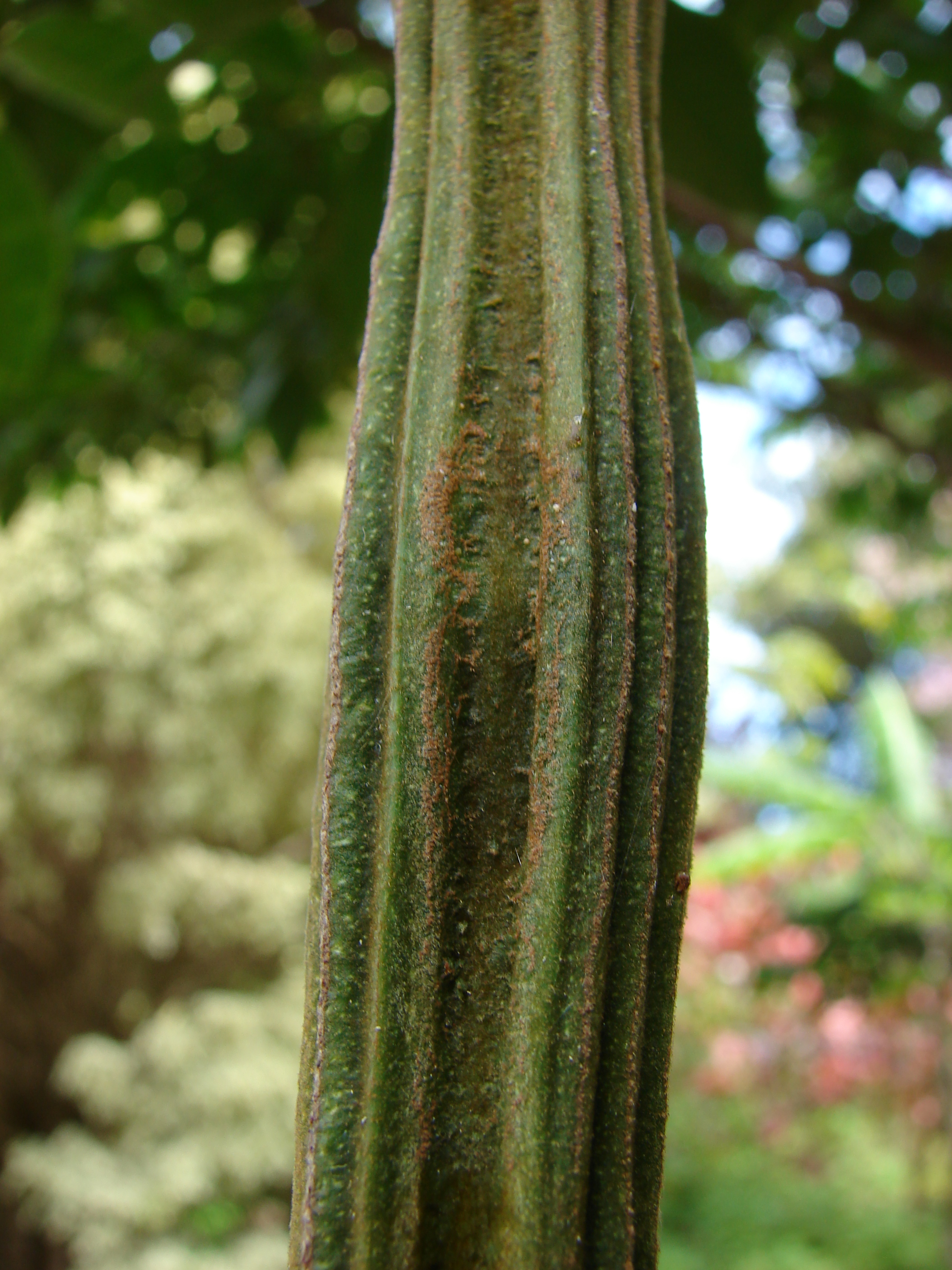
Pacay Bean

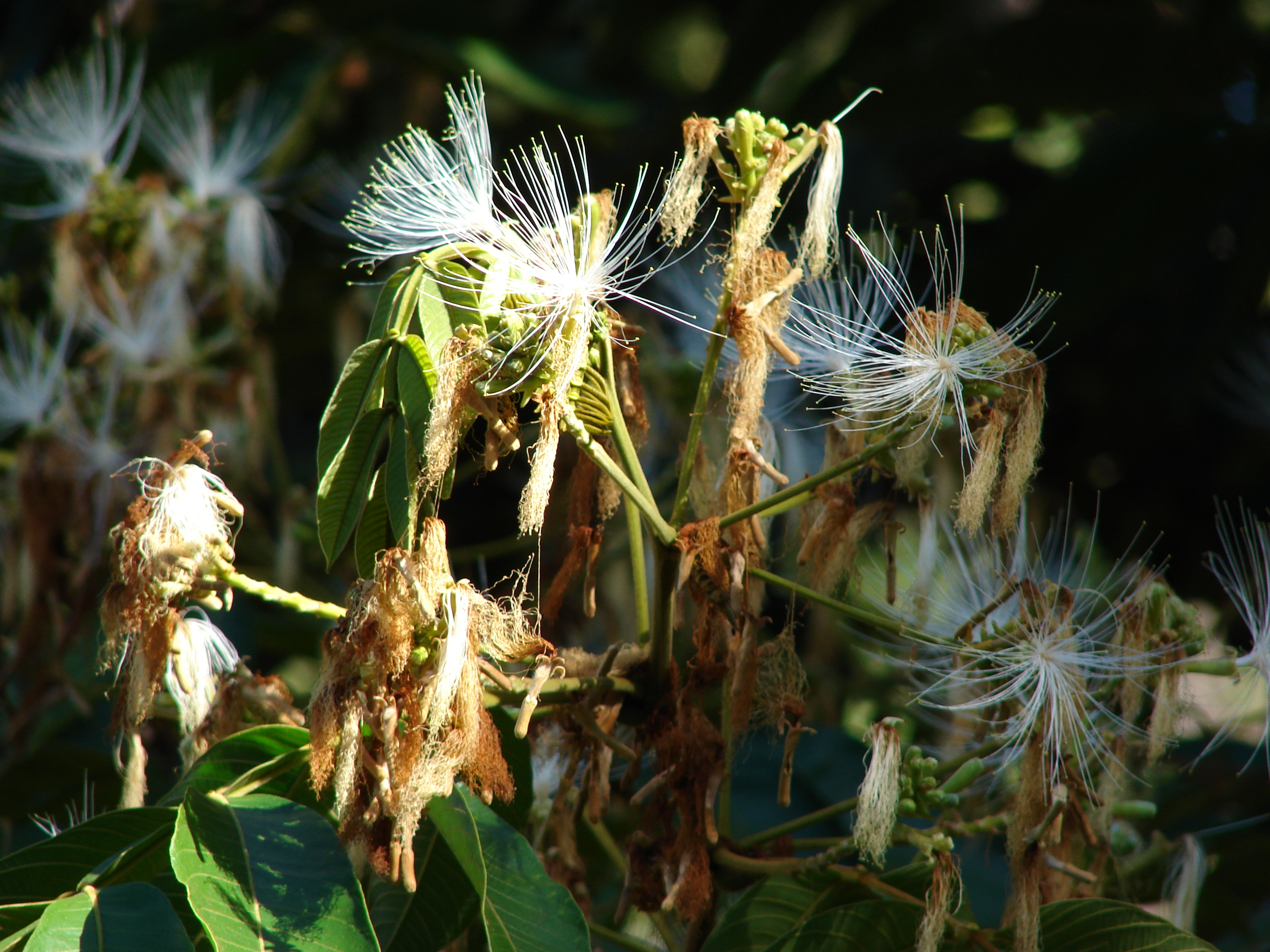
Flowers

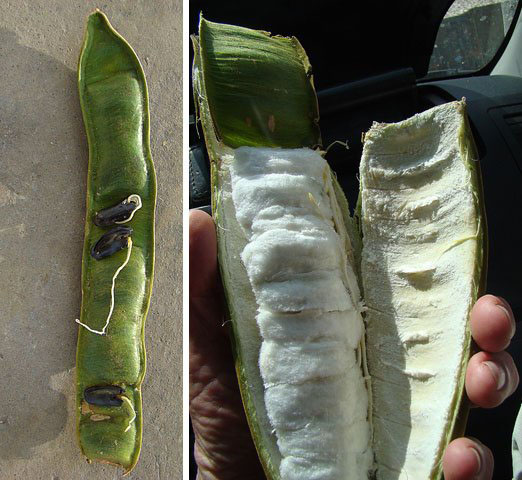
Cross section of Bean

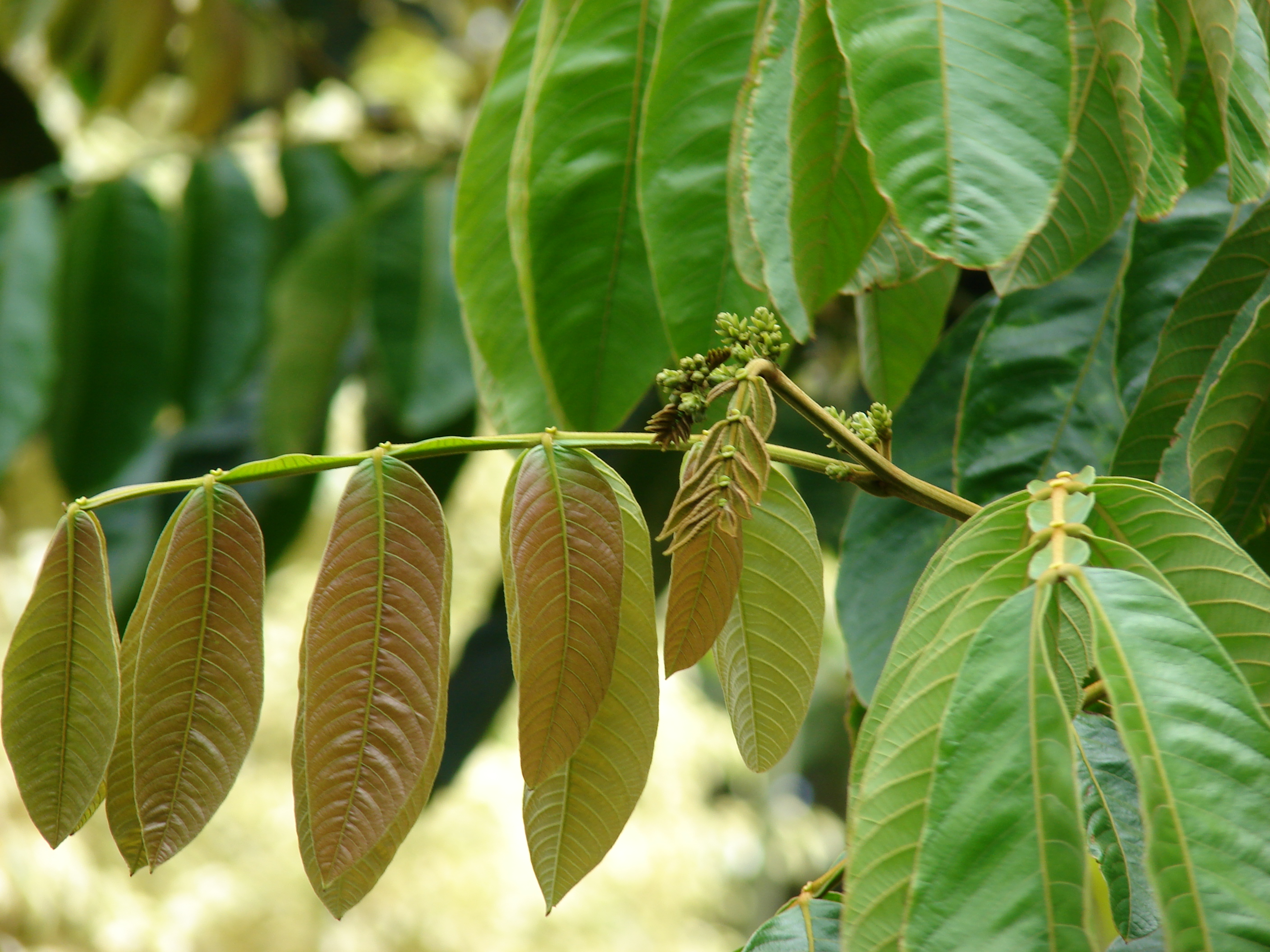
New Leaves

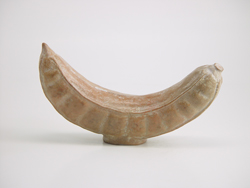
Moche culture vessel in the form of a pacay pod
