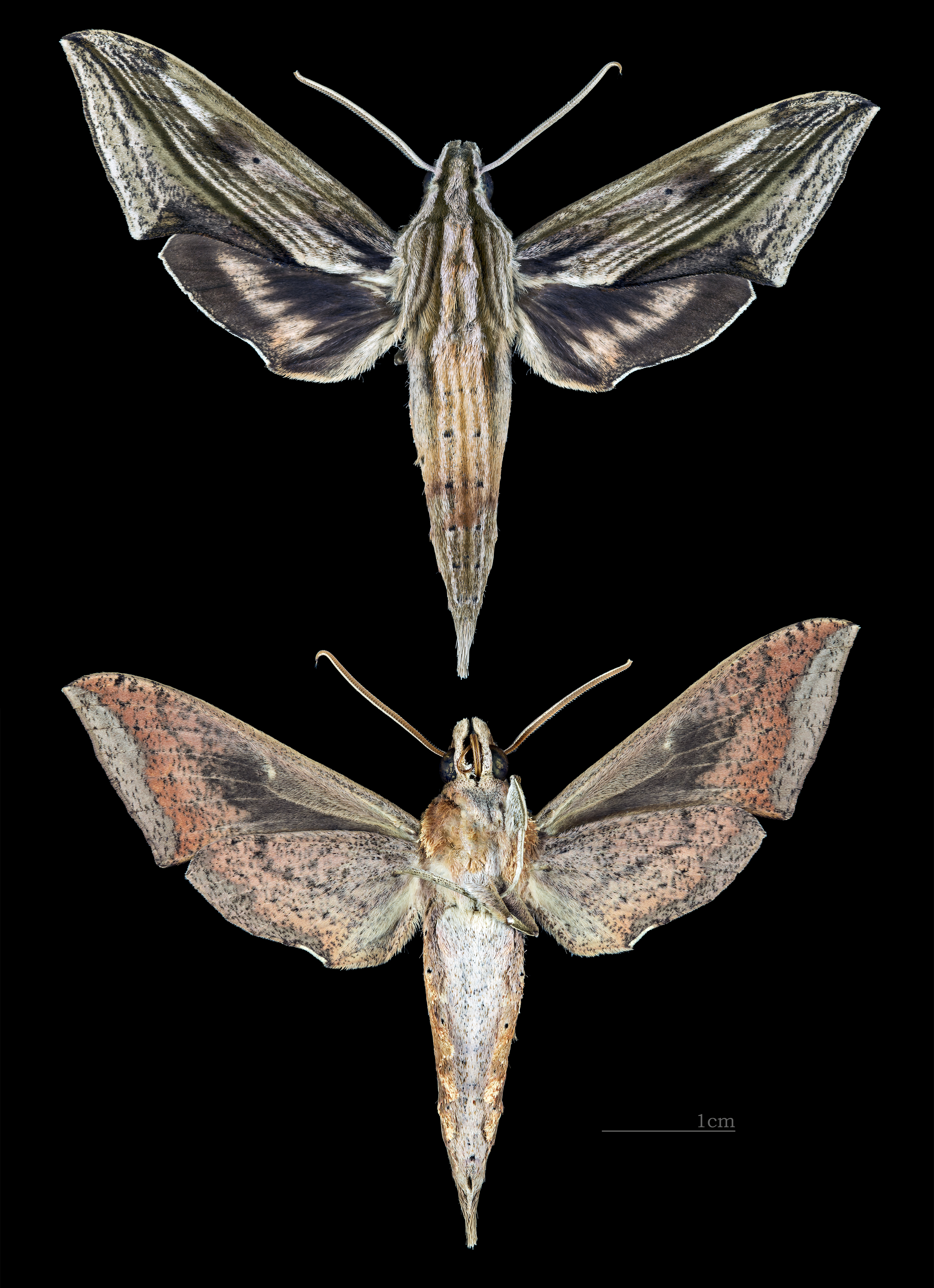

Scientific classification
- Kingdom: Animalia
- Phylum: Arthropoda
- Clade: Pancrustacea
- Class: Insecta
- Order: Lepidoptera
- Family: Sphingidae
- Genus: Xylophanes
- Species: X. lichyi

Binomial name
- Xylophanes lichyi Kitching & Cadiou, 2000

= Xylophanes lichyi =

Species of moth

Xylophanes lichyi is a moth of the family Sphingidae. It is known from Bolivia.

The length of the forewings is 29–35 mm for males and 32–38 mm for females. It is similar to Xylophanes maculator, but the dorsal lines of the tegulae, thorax and abdomen are fainter. Furthermore, the forewing upperside ground colour is more greenish, the first postmedian line is more basal in position and dentate over its distal half and the median band of the hindwing upperside is broader, with an even inner edge and lacking the pink shading.

The larvae probably feed on Rubiaceae and Malvaceae species.
