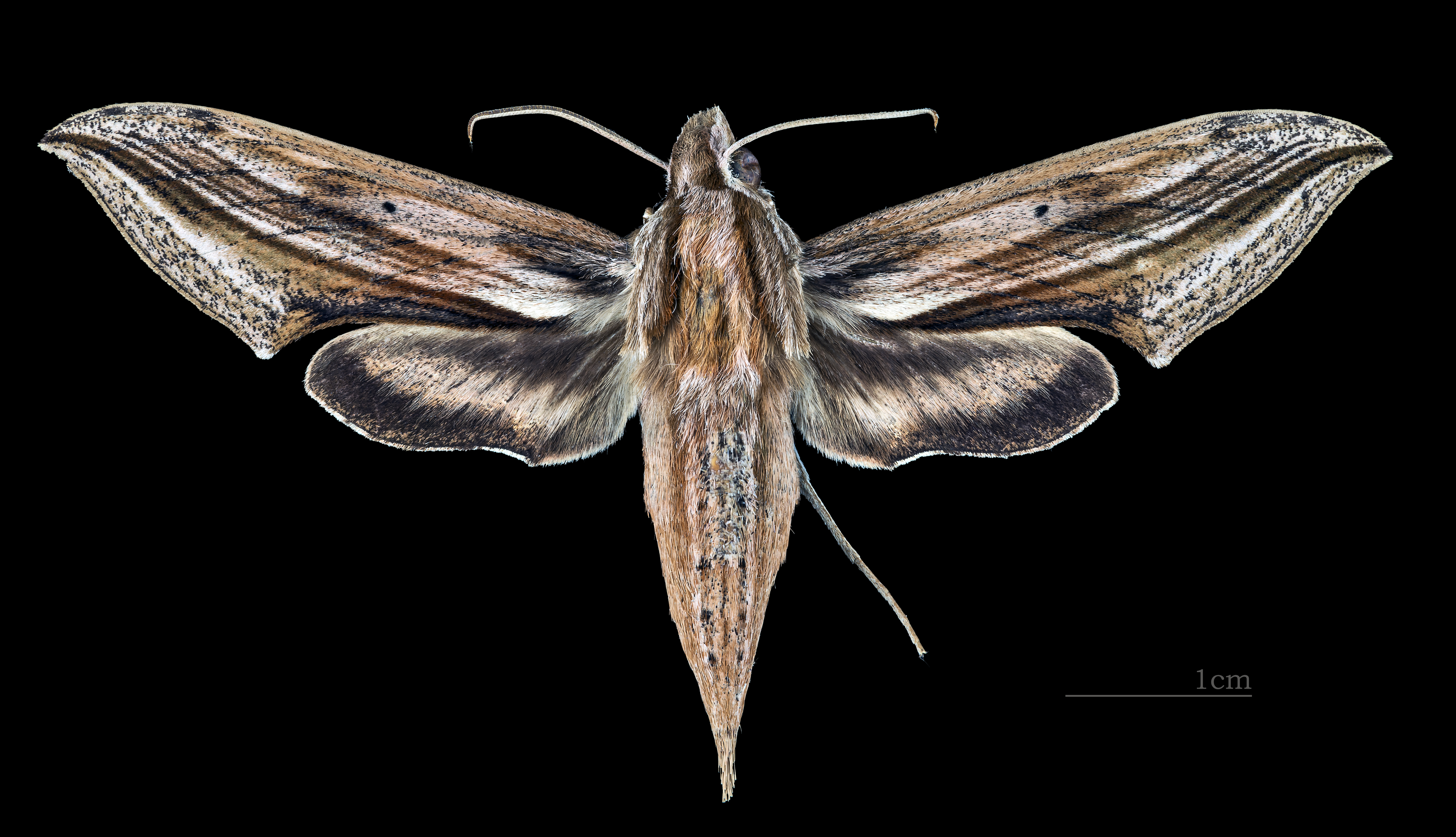
- Xylophanes maculator male dorsal
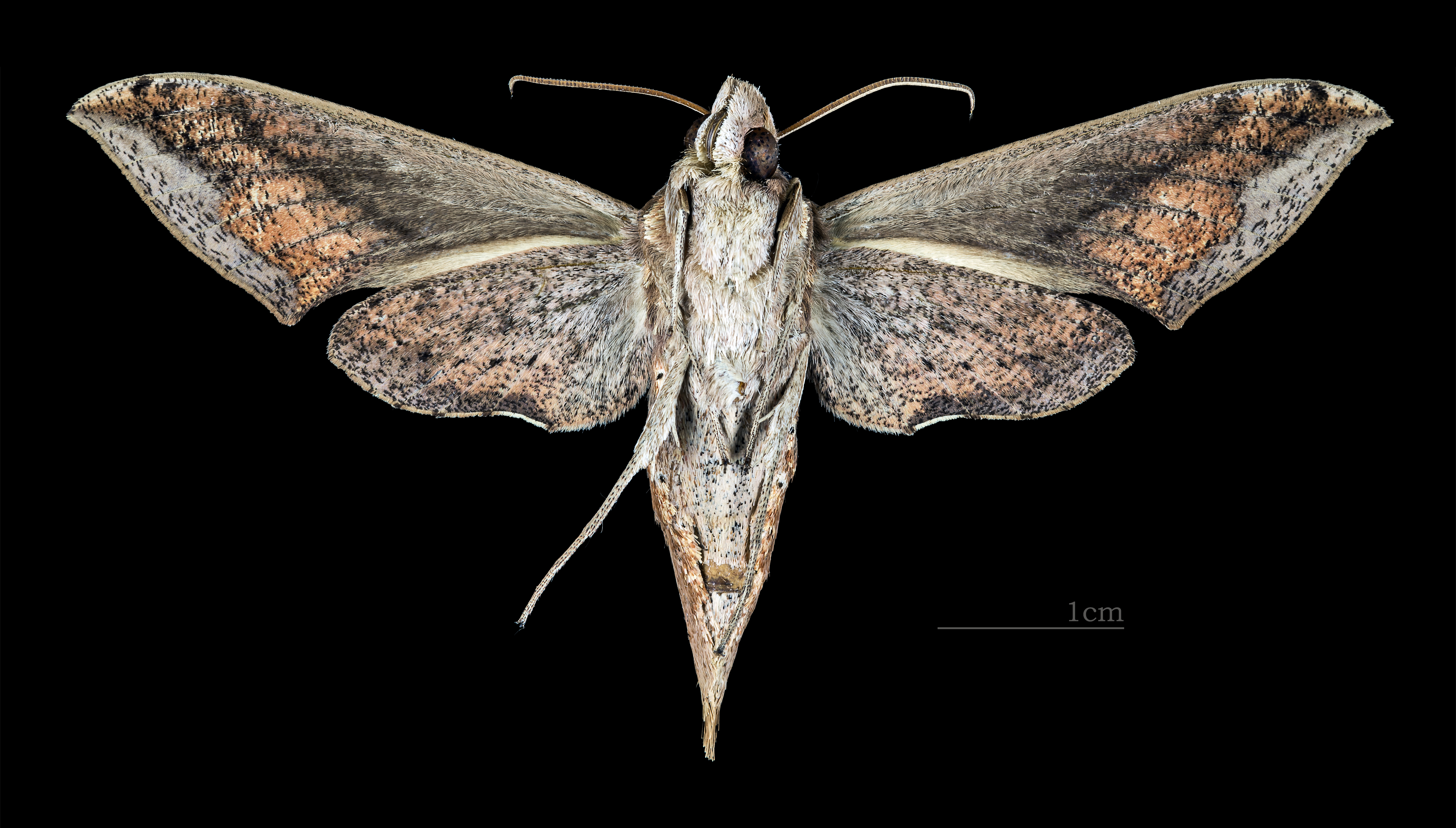
- Xylophanes maculator male ventral

Scientific classification
- Domain: Eukaryota
- Kingdom: Animalia
- Phylum: Arthropoda
- Class: Insecta
- Order: Lepidoptera
- Family: Sphingidae
- Genus: Xylophanes
- Species: X. maculator

Binomial name
- Xylophanes maculator (Boisduval, 1875)

Synonyms
- Choerocampa maculator Boisduval, 1875; Chaerocampa moeschleri Erschoff, 1877; Choerocampa wolfi Druce, 1883; Xylophanes linearis Clark, 1935

= Xylophanes maculator =

Species of moth

Xylophanes maculator is a moth of the family Sphingidae. It is found from Mexico and Belize to Ecuador and further south to Venezuela and Bolivia. The wingspan is 65–75 mm.

Adults are on wing in April, from June to July, August or September and from November to December in Costa Rica but might even be on wing year-round.

The larvae probably feed on Rubiaceae (such as Psychotria nervosa and Psychotria horizontalis), Fabaceae (such as Inga vera), Malvaceae and Dilleniaceae (such as Tetracera volubilis) species.
