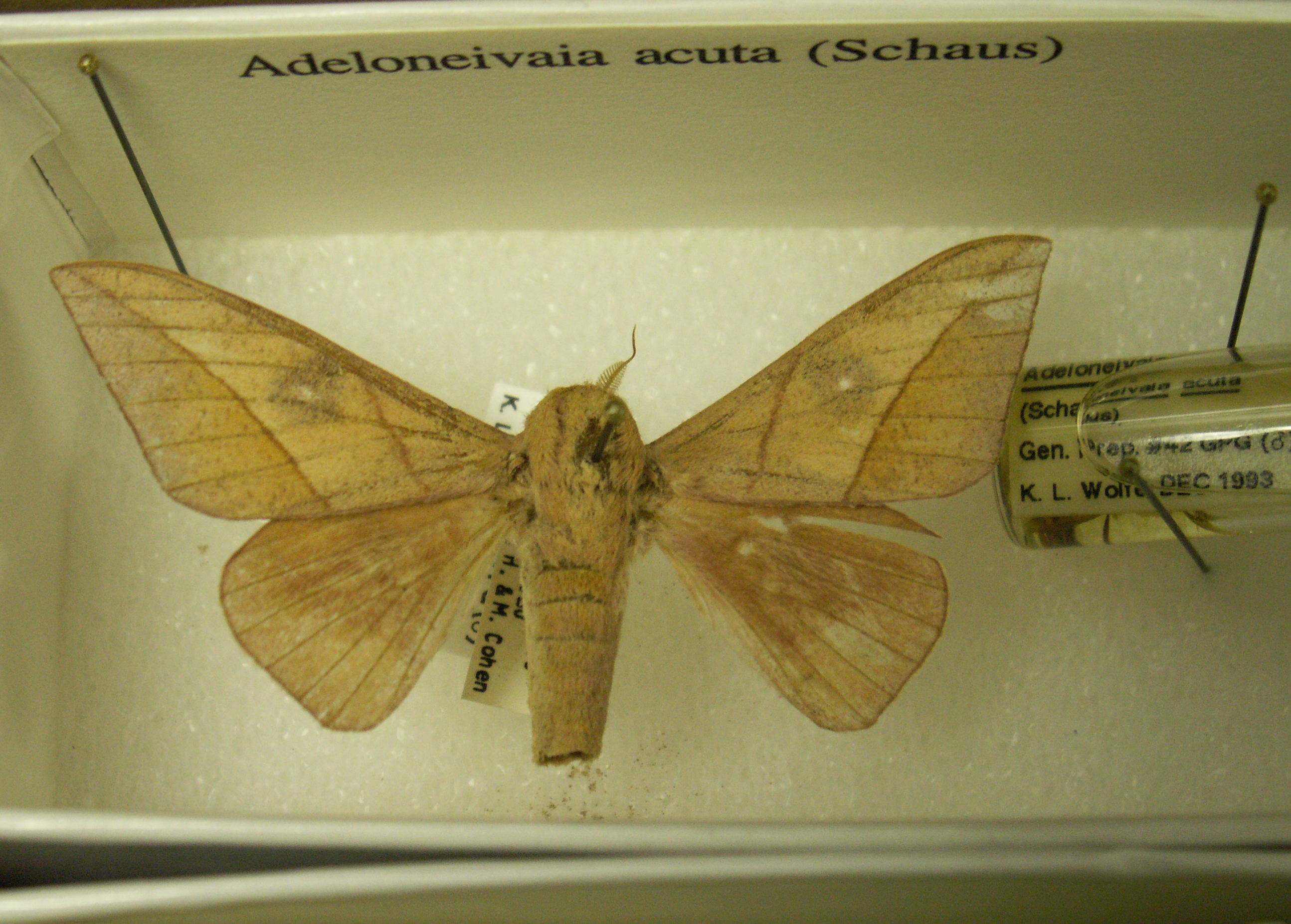

Scientific classification
- Domain: Eukaryota
- Kingdom: Animalia
- Phylum: Arthropoda
- Class: Insecta
- Order: Lepidoptera
- Family: Saturniidae
- Genus: Adeloneivaia
- Species: A. acuta

Binomial name
- Adeloneivaia acuta Schaus, 1896

= Adeloneivaia acuta =

Species of moth

Adeloneivaia acuta is a moth of the family Saturniidae. It is found from Venezuela to Paraguay and in the south-east of Brazil, but not in the Amazon.
