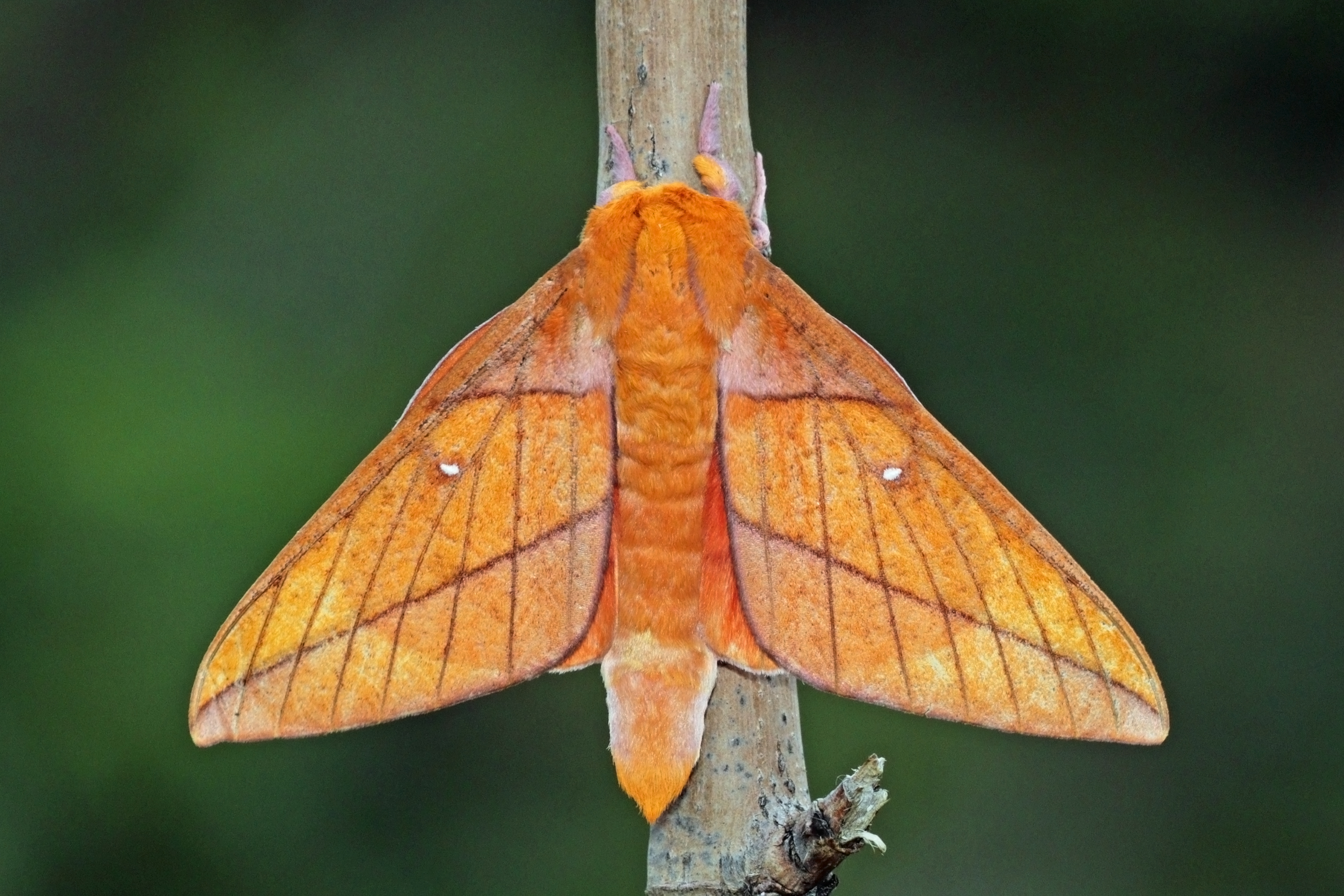
- A. jason Mount Totumas cloud forest, Panama

Scientific classification
- Domain: Eukaryota
- Kingdom: Animalia
- Phylum: Arthropoda
- Class: Insecta
- Order: Lepidoptera
- Family: Saturniidae
- Subfamily: Ceratocampinae
- Genus: Adeloneivaia; Travassos, 1940

= Adeloneivaia =

Genus of moths

Adeloneivaia is a genus of moths in the family Saturniidae first described by Travassos in 1940.

== Species ==
- Adeloneivaia acuta (Schaus, 1896)
- Adeloneivaia bellardi (Schaus, 1928)
- Adeloneivaia boisduvalii (Doumet, 1859)
- Adeloneivaia catharina (Bouvier, 1927)
- Adeloneivaia catoxantha (W. Rothschild, 1907)
- Adeloneivaia fallax (Boisduval, 1872)
- Adeloneivaia irrorata (Schaus, 1900)
- Adeloneivaia isara (Dognin, 1905)
- Adeloneivaia jason (Boisduval, 1872)
- Adeloneivaia minuta (Bouvier, 1927)
- Adeloneivaia pelias (W. Rothschild, 1907)
- Adeloneivaia sabulosa (W. Rothschild, 1907)
- Adeloneivaia schubarti Rego Barros & Mielke, 1970
- Adeloneivaia subangulata (Herrich-Schaeffer, 1855)
- Adeloneivaia wellingi Lemaire, 1982
