= Inga oerstediana =

Scientific classification
- Kingdom: Plantae
- Clade: Tracheophytes
- Clade: Angiosperms
- Clade: Eudicots
- Clade: Rosids
- Order: Fabales
- Family: Fabaceae
- Subfamily: Caesalpinioideae
- Clade: Mimosoid clade
- Genus: Inga
- Species: I. oerstediana

Binomial name
- Inga oerstediana Benth.

Species of tree

Inga oerstediana is a species of tree in the family Fabaceae. It was described by English botanist George Bentham. It can be found in Mexico, Belize, El Salvador, Honduras, Nicaragua, Costa Rica, Panama, Colombia, Venezuela, Ecuador, Peru, Bolivia, Brazil and Trinidad and Tobago.

== Description ==
Inga oerstediana grows to be between 4 and 20 meters tall. Its bole is between 10 and 40 centimeters in diameter. The seedpod is between 8 and 32 centimeters long.

Inga oerstediana has three to five pairs of leaflets, with red veins, rachi and leaf veins. Inga oerstediana can be found in the lower mountain areas of Panama and Costa Rica, as well as lowland rain forests. Inga oerstediana has similarities to Inga edulis, and is sometimes considered the same species.

== Uses ==
Inga oerstediana is used to provide shade in coffee plantations in Central America. The pulp surrounding the seeds is sweet and edible. The wood of Inga oerstediana is usable but is vulnerable to dry wood termites and is not durable in soil.
