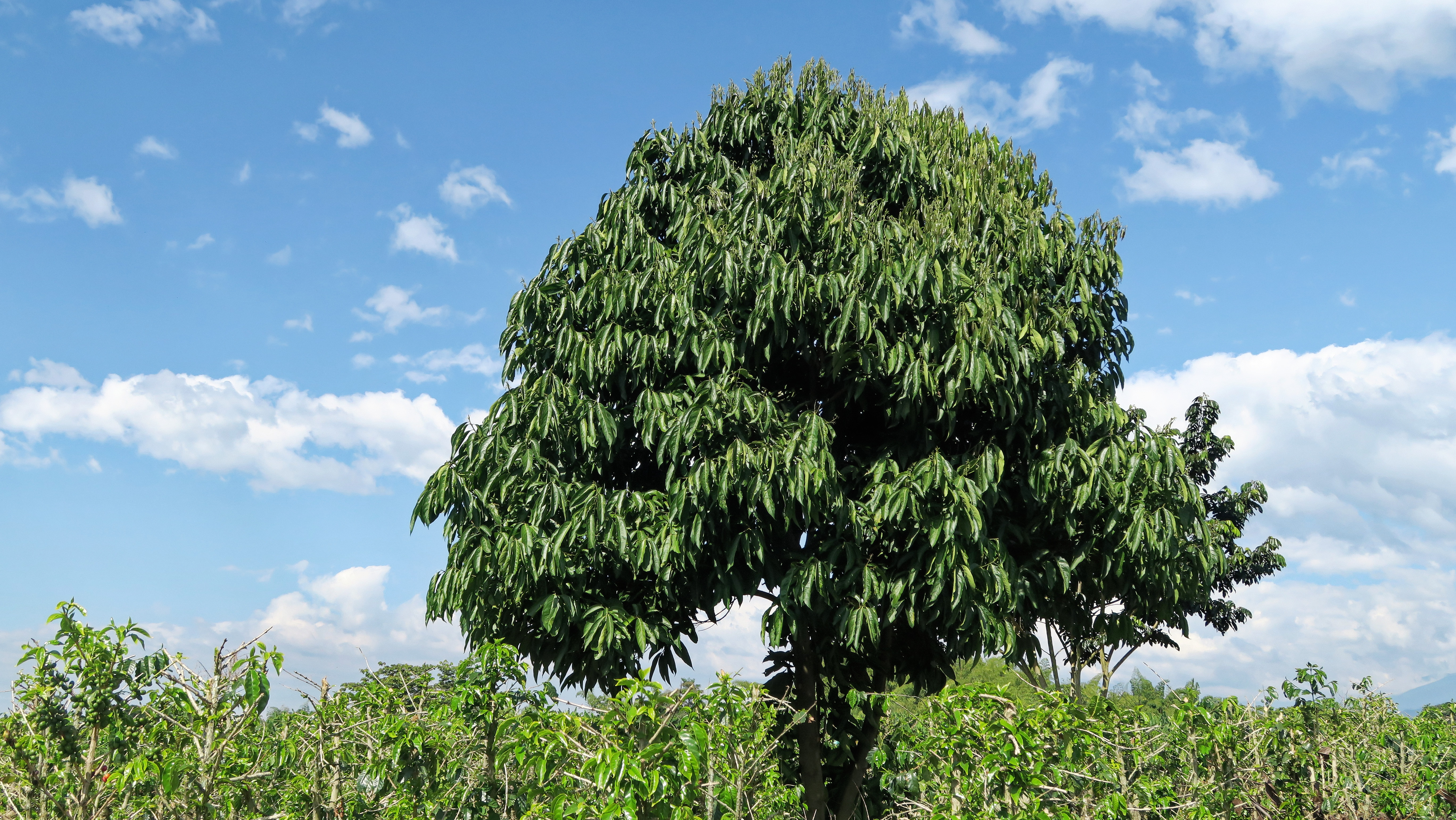

Conservation status
- Least Concern (IUCN 3.1)

Scientific classification
- Kingdom: Plantae
- Clade: Tracheophytes
- Clade: Angiosperms
- Clade: Eudicots
- Clade: Rosids
- Order: Fabales
- Family: Fabaceae
- Subfamily: Caesalpinioideae
- Clade: Mimosoid clade
- Genus: Inga
- Species: I. edulis

Binomial name
- Inga edulis Mart.

Synonyms
- See text

= Inga edulis =

Species of tree

Inga edulis, known as ice-cream bean, paterna, whitey, padoo, cushín (short variety), joaquiniquil, cuaniquil (both from Nahuatl: cuahuxinicuile combining cuahuitl "tree"; icxitl "feet" and necuilli "crooked") guama, or guaba, is a fruit native to Central and South America. It is in the mimosoid tribe of the legume family Fabaceae. It is widely grown, especially by Indigenous Amazonians, for shade, food, timber, medicines, and production of the alcoholic beverage cachiri. It is popular in Peru, Ecuador, Pernambuco-Brazil, Venezuela, Guyana, Costa Rica and Colombia. The taxonomic generic name Inga is derived from its name with the Tupí people of South America (ingá) while the specific name edulis is Latin for "edible". The common name "ice-cream bean" alludes to the sweet flavor and smooth texture of the pulp.

== Biology ==
Mature trees of I. edulis reach 30 m (98 ft) high and 60 cm (2.0 ft) diameter at breast height, usually branching from below 3 m (9.8 ft). The branches form a broad, flat, moderately dense canopy. I. edulis can be evergreen in tropical regions or deciduous when planted in colder regions. The tree has a pale grey-coloured trunk. The stems and young twigs can be sparsely to densely haired. The leaves are alternate, evenly pinnate, 10–30 cm long, with four to six pairs of opposite, dark-green, membranous, slightly pubescent, oval leaflets. The terminal leaflets can grow up to 18 cm long by 11 cm wide in comparison to the basal ones. Extrafloral nectaries are placed on petioles, and stipules can be either inconspicuous, absent, or caducous.

The flowers are fragrant, sessile, and pentamerous, and are arranged in dense axillary spikes. Each flower has a calyx tube with five puberulent, striated lobes, and a corolla with five silky, villous petals. These are around 14–20 mm long and contain numerous white stamens. The fruits are longitudinally ribbed, cylindrical, indehiscent, leguminous pods, which can be straight, curved, or often spirally twisted up. They are pendant and up to 1 m long and yellowish brown to green in colour. The number of purplish-black to olive-colored ovoid seeds can vary from 10 to 20. These are embedded in the sweet, cottony, white arillus, which gives it the name ice-cream bean, since their texture and sweetness are reminiscent of ice cream.

=== Symbiosis ===
Inga species are symbiotic with ants (e.g., Pheidole species), which feed on the nectar of the extrafloral nectaries. In exchange, the ants patrol over the Inga plant to protect it against herbivores. Certain insects, such as Riodinid caterpillars, excrete sugary honeydew from their tentacle nectaries. The ants form a symbiosis with the caterpillars by letting them feed on the tree in exchange for their sugary honeydew.

The inga plant can also form symbiotic relationships in which nitrogen gas can be fixated by rhizobial bacteria and mycorrhiza, as can other legumes. Surveys have shown that I. edulis forms a mutualistic relationship with Bradyrhizobium bacteria.

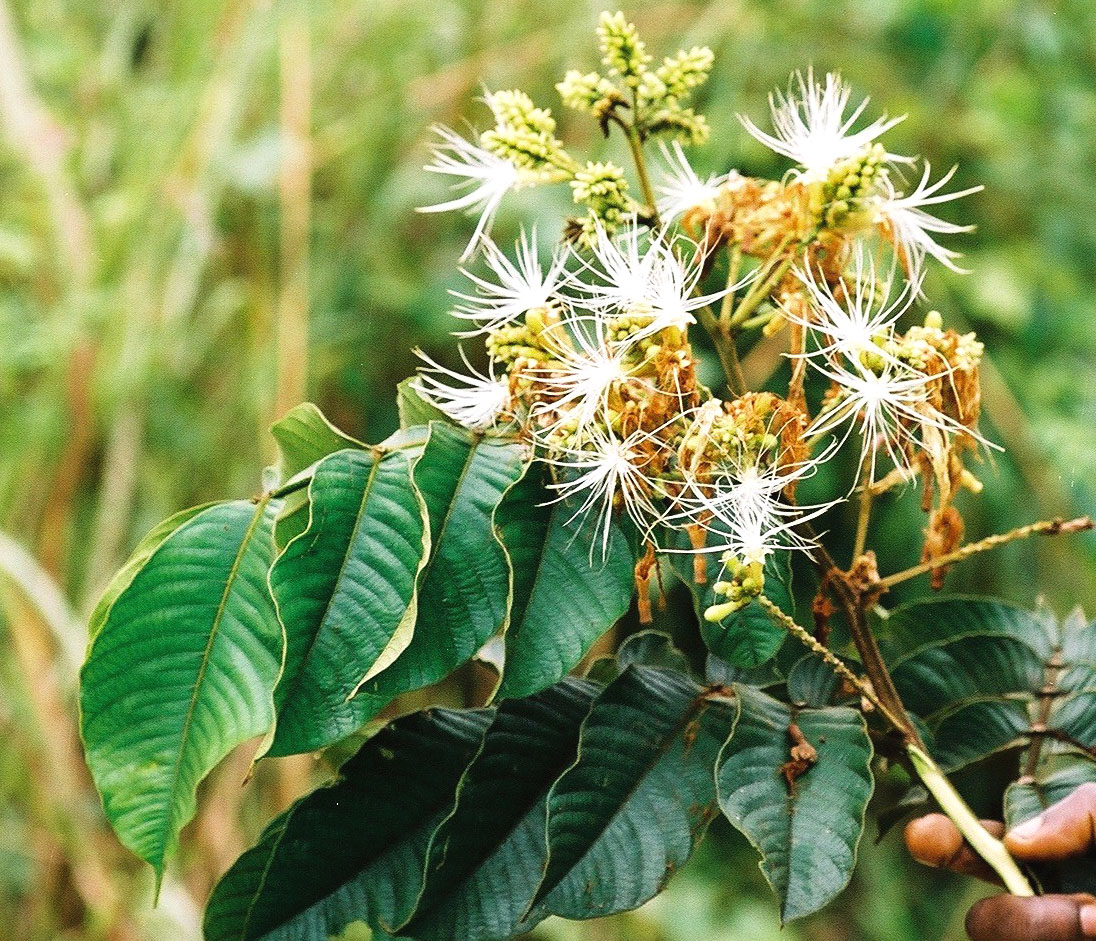
Flowers

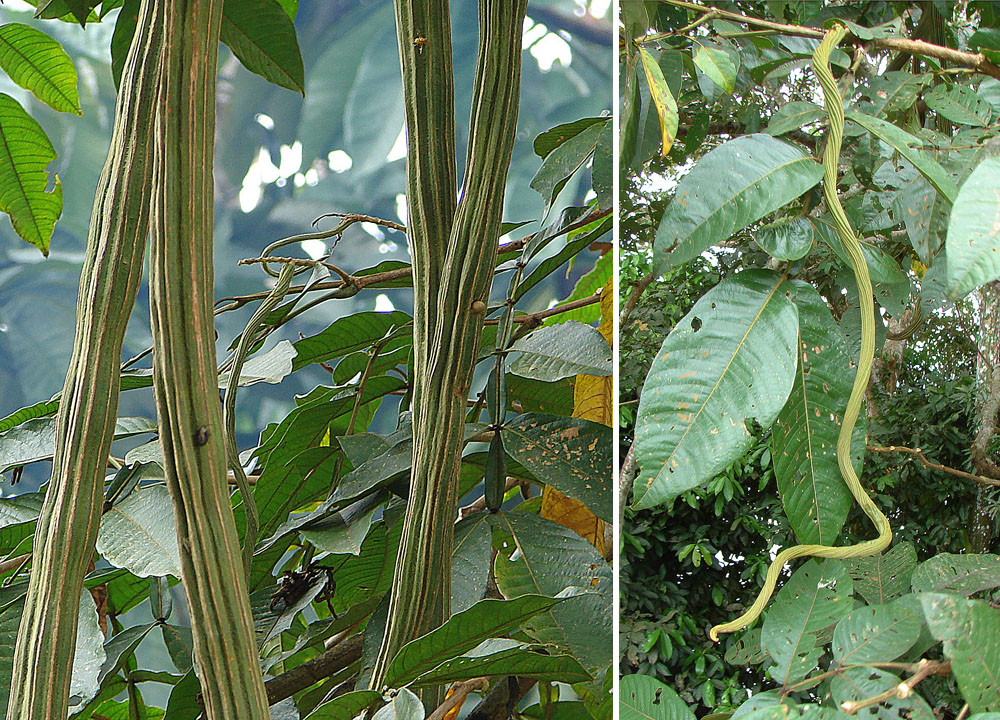
Mature and young pods

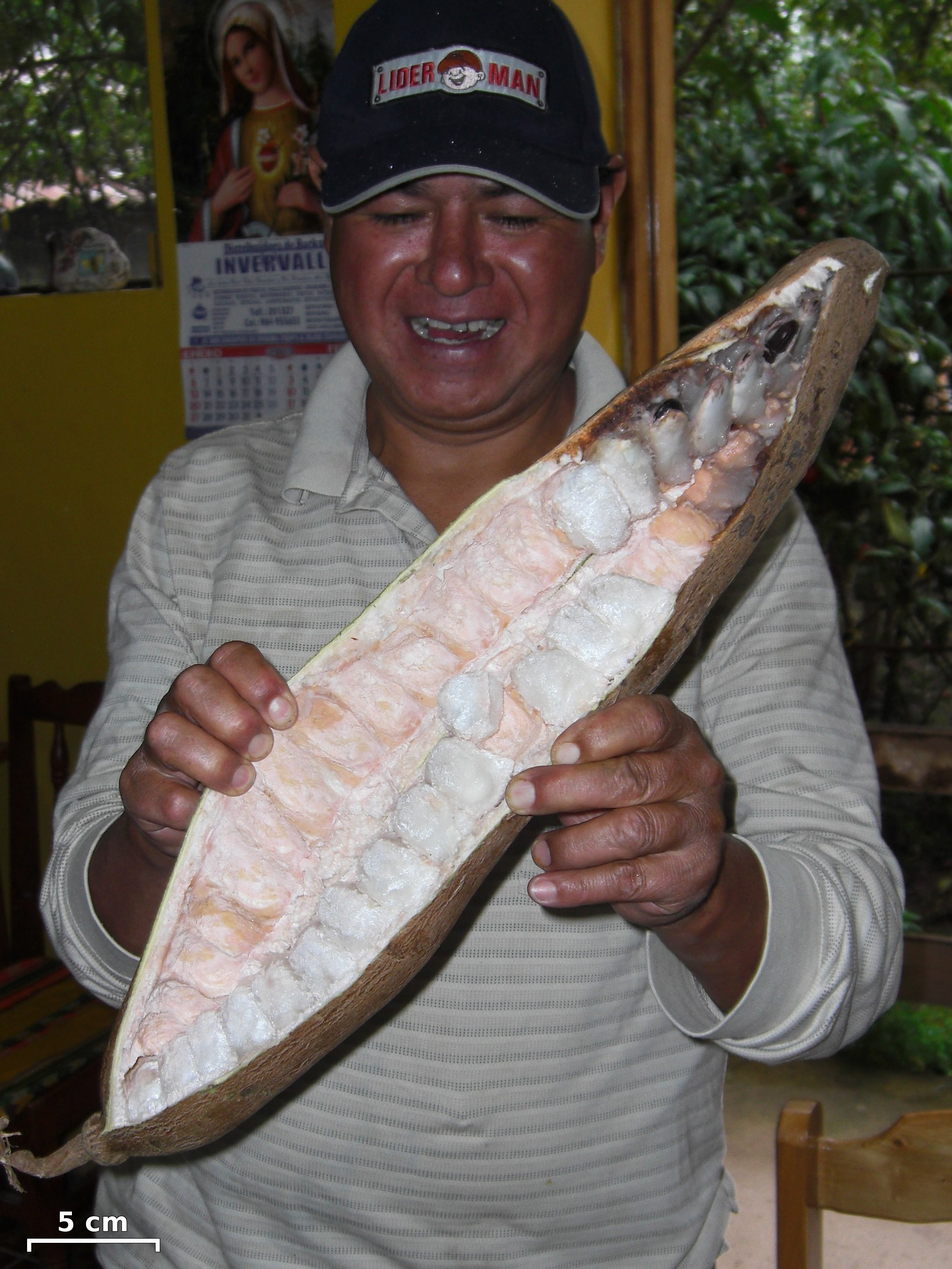
Open pod

== Synonyms ==
This plant has a convoluted history of synonymy with Inga vera. The plants discussed under that name by Brenan and Kunth are actually I. edulis, whereas that based on the writings of Carl Ludwig Willdenow refers to the actual I. vera. Inga edulis in works referring back to authorities other than von Martius usually refers to Inga feuilleei.

Synonyms of Inga edulis Mart.:

- Feuilleea edulis (Mart.) Kuntze
- Inga benthamiana Meisn.
- Inga edulis var. grenadensis Urb.
- Inga minutula (Schery) T.S.Elias
- Inga scabriuscula Benth.
- Inga vera Kunth
- Inga vera sensu Brenan
- Inga ynga (Vell.) J.W.Moore
- Mimosa inga L.
- Mimosa ynga Vell.

== Ecology ==
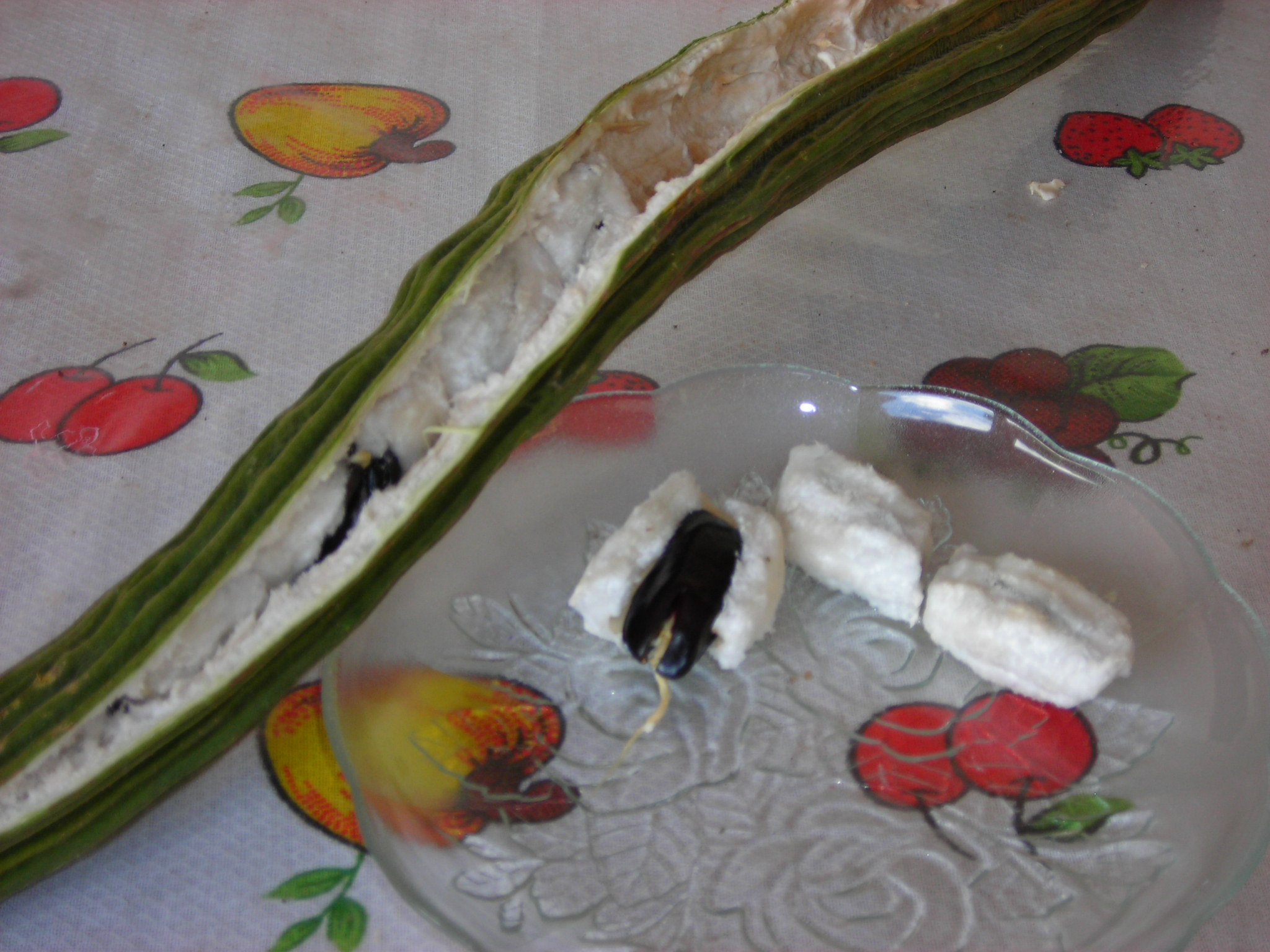
Inga edulis pod containing seeds, each covered in sweet white sarcotesta.

The natural distribution of I. edulis spreads from Central to South America, and ranges from subtropical dry to tropical wet conditions. It can be found at elevations from sea level up to 2200 m. I. edulis grows best when mean annual daytime temperatures range from 23 to 30 °C. However, it can tolerate 18–35 °C. During the resting period, mature trees can survive −2 °C, while young plants are killed at 0 °C. Preferred annual precipitation ranges from 1200 to 2500 mm but 640 to 4000 mm of annual precipitation can be tolerated, also. It can be grown on a widely varying range of soil conditions. It prefers a soil pH of 5.0–6.5, but can also grow in very strongly acidic soil down to a pH of 4.5 or moderately alkaline conditions up to pH 8.0. The natural habitat includes margins of large rivers like the Amazon, thickets below high water line, and wooded swamps. The tree can tolerate temporarily waterlogged soils for 2–3 months each year, but it can also tolerate drought seasons up to 6 months. Furthermore, I. edulis can cope with heavy soils or slope fairly well. In terms of soil fertility, I. edulis is not only unpretentious, but also has the potential to improve soil quality. As a leguminous tree, this species can compensate for nutrient-depleted soils by fixing nitrogen with its root nodules. Ammonium and nitrate salts found in soil typically result in nodulation reduction. I. edulis is an exception, as its nodules increase in size when ammonium ion levels are at 5 mM. Nitrate, though, did not benefit I. edulis and continued to show properties that prevented nodulation. Additionally to nitrogen, I. edulis is reported to significantly increase the extractable phosphorus content in the soil, thus further ameliorates degraded soils.

== Cultivation ==
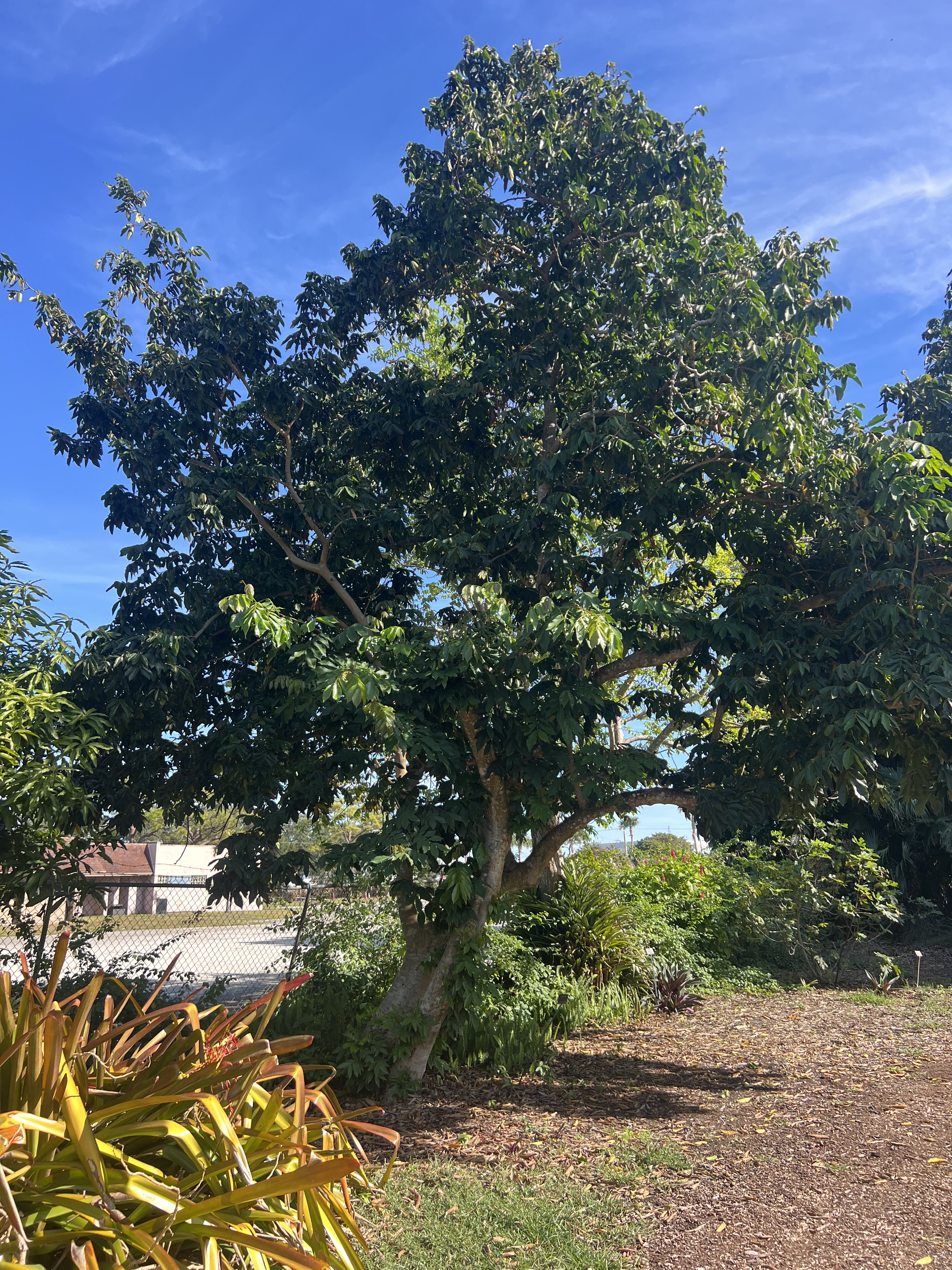
At Mounts Botanical Garden

I. edulis is widely cultivated in agroforestry systems in its neotropical dispersal area. This form of cultivation, often associated with coffee or cocoa culture, is widely known since pre-Columbian times. Germination of I. edulis seeds is fairly easy, as the seeds are recalcitrant and often germinate already in the pod. Seeds lose their ability to germinate, though, after two weeks of storage. Direct sowing of the seeds is possible, but the establishment of seedlings with already a certain height can decrease competition with noxious weeds, thus increasing growth. Further, the inoculation with rhizobia and mycorrhizal fungi in depleted soils is recommended to promote growth. These inoculi can easily be produced by collecting soil, nodules, and fine roots from mature, nodulated I. edulis stands. This species seems to be very resistant to pests and diseases. Minor damage can result from fungal attacks in the seedling stage. Mature I. edulis can be defoliated by Lepidoptera larvae. Also, fruit fly larvae often damage the seed testa. In Ecuador, I. edulis is specially susceptible to mistletoe infestations.

== Uses ==
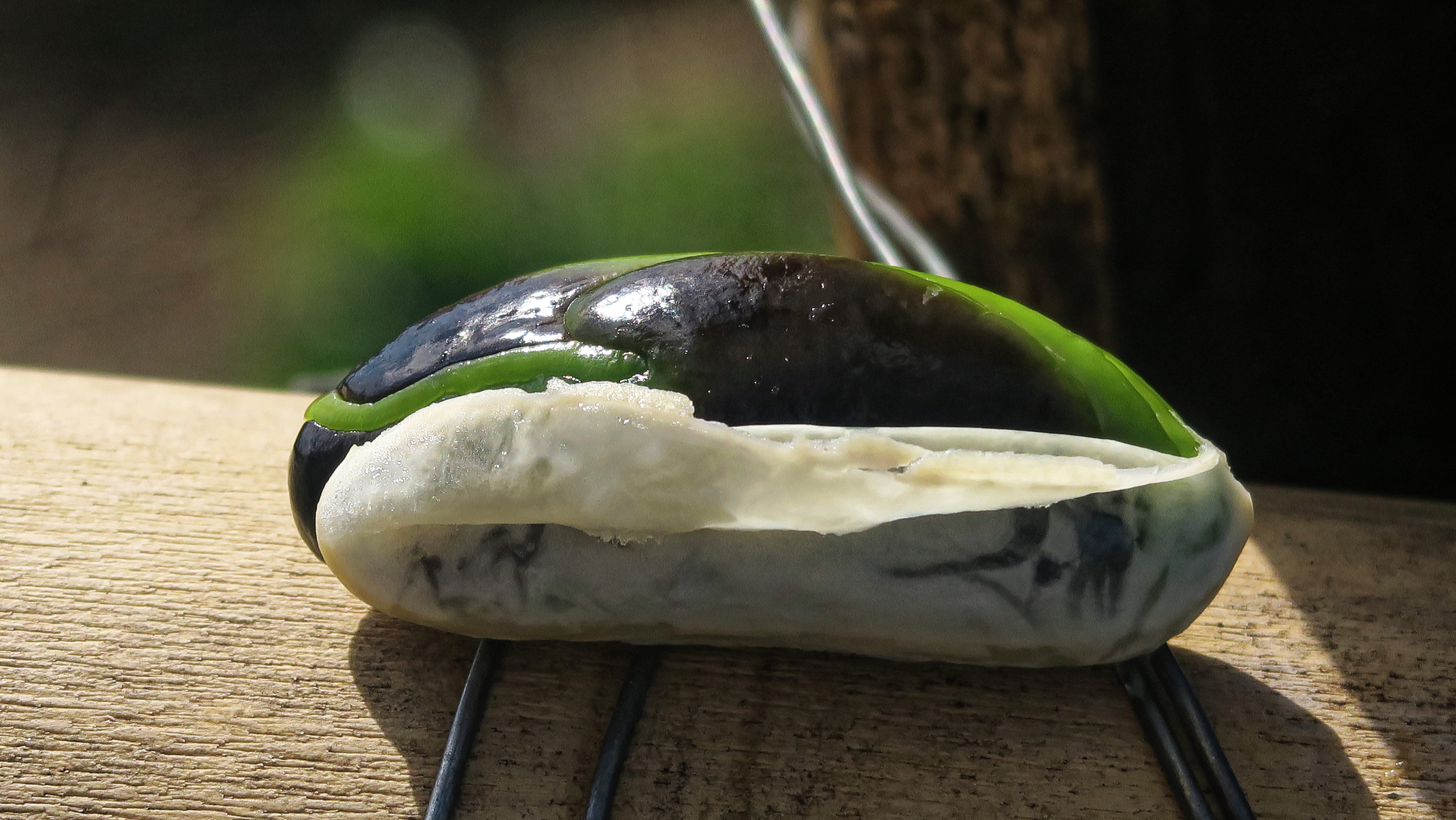
Individual seed

Inga edulis pulp
Nutritional value per 100 g (3.5 oz)
- Energy: 251 kJ (60 kcal)
- Carbohydrates: 15.5 g
- Dietary fiber: 1.2 g
- Fat: 0.1 g
- Protein: 1.0 g
- ^{†}Percentages estimated using US recommendations for adults.

Food crop

I. edulis has been cultivated as a fruit tree for millennia, and is widely sold on the local South American marketplace, mainly for the sweet, succulent pulp surrounding the seeds. The white pulp (aril) is consumed raw as a sweet snack, though it is less nutritious than the seeds. Toxic compounds such as trypsin and chymotrypsin inhibitors contained in the seeds of I. edulis are destroyed through cooking.

Inga edulis seeds
Nutritional value per 100 g (3.5 oz)
- Energy: 494 kJ (118 kcal)
- Carbohydrates: 24.0 g
- Dietary fiber: 1.6 g
- Fat: 0.7 g
- Protein: 10.7 g
- ^{†}Percentages estimated using US recommendations for adults.

The taste is described as resembling that of vanilla ice cream. Some varieties even possess a slight cinnamon flavor. The seeds are edible only when cooked and have a taste similar to that of chickpeas.

In Colombia, the arils are also used to prepare an alcoholic beverage called cachiri for a festival of the same name. The native women chew the arils and spit the mixture into a vat, where it is left to ferment. The fruit ripens quickly and can only be kept for three to four days, limiting potential export opportunities, but refrigeration can extend shelf life to about three weeks.

=== Use in agroforestry systems ===
Due to its rapid growth and ability to improve soil properties, I. edulis has found widespread use in tropical agroforestry. Most notably, inga alley cropping is used as an alternative to slash-and-burn cultivation. It is also a popular shade tree for coffee, cocoa, and tea plantations. One important reason for this is that in comparison to other shade tree species, I. edulis retains its leaves in the dry season. Cuttings and leaves are also used as mulch and animal fodder. The wood is sometimes used as timber and for fuel; its popularity as a source of firewood stems from its high caloric value and weak smoke production.

Despite its rapid growth and significant potential to improve soils in agroforestry systems, I. edulis has not been the object of any improved breeding programs. However, the plant has been shown to exhibit strong introgression with I. ingoides in species-contact areas. This could allow for selection of hybrids via interspecific hybridization to further increase yield and flood tolerance of the crop.

=== Medicinal uses ===
I. edulis is widely used in native South American folk medicine. Decoctions of the leaves, bark, or root commonly are used as treatments for diarrhea, arthritis, and rheumatism. Crushed, boiled leaves are ingested to relieve coughing or applied to lip sores, possibly caused by herpes. Several studies have investigated I. edulis as a source of polyphenols for use as antioxidants and have shown promising results.
