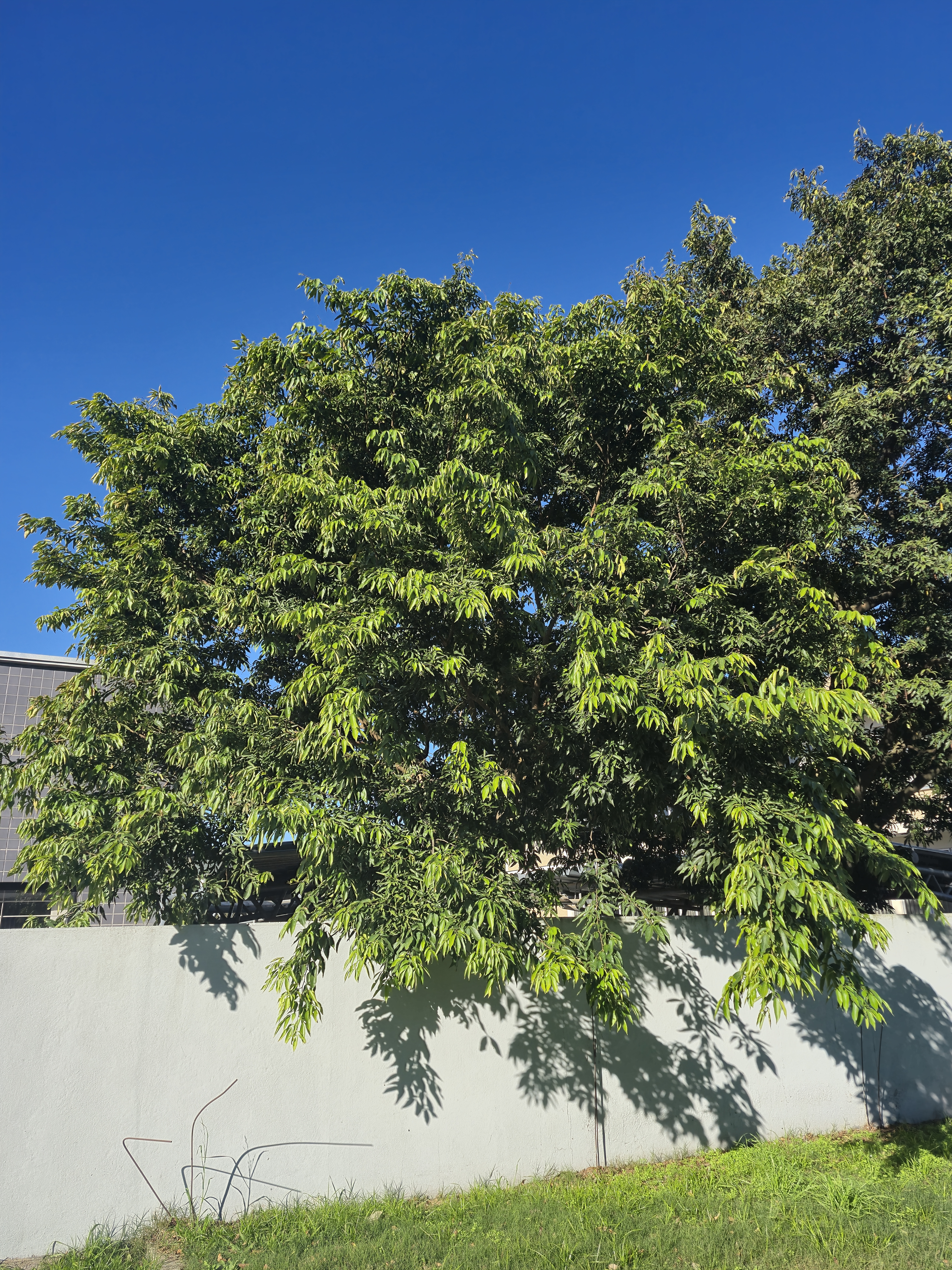
- Inga sp. tree
- Inga sp. fruit

Scientific classification
- Kingdom: Plantae
- Clade: Embryophytes
- Clade: Tracheophytes
- Clade: Spermatophytes
- Clade: Angiosperms
- Clade: Eudicots
- Clade: Rosids
- Order: Fabales
- Family: Fabaceae
- Subfamily: Caesalpinioideae
- Clade: Mimosoid clade
- Genus: Inga; Mill.

Type species
- Inga vera Willd.

Species
- Hundreds, see List of Inga species

Synonyms
- Affonsea A.St.-Hil. (1833); Amosa Neck. (1790), opus utique oppr.; Feuilleea L. ex Kuntze (1891), nom. superfl.; Ingaria Raf. (1838)

= Inga =

Genus of legumes

Inga is a genus of small tropical, tough-leaved, nitrogen-fixing trees and shrubs, subfamily Mimosoideae. Inga's leaves are pinnate, and flowers are generally white. Many of the hundreds of species are used ornamentally.

Several related plants have been placed into this genus at one time, for example Yopo (Cohoba, Mopo, Nopo or Parica – Anadenanthera peregrina – as Inga niopo).

The seeds are covered with sweet white powder. The pulp covering the seeds is lightly fibrous and sweet, and rich in minerals; it is edible in the raw state. The tree's name originates from the Tupi word in-gá meaning "soaked", due to the fruit powder consistency. The tree usually blooms twice a year.

Within the Inga genus there are around 300 species, most of them native and growing in the Amazon forest region although some species are also found in Mexico, Greater and Lesser Antilles and other countries in South America, being an exclusively neotropical genus. The trees are usually found by river and lake edges because their seeds are carried there by floods.

All Inga species produce their seeds in "bean-like" pods and some can reach up to 1 m long, in general the pods are 10–30 cm long.

Trees can reach up to 15 metres and they are widely used for producing shade over coffee plants. The plant benefits from well drained soil. The flowers are white with some green and the tree can produce fruits almost all year long.

Inga species, most notably Inga edulis (commonly known as "ice-cream-bean" or, in Spanish, guama, guaba, guaba de bejuco or paterna depending on the country or region) often have edible pulp. The name derives from the fact that those of I. edulis resembles vanilla ice cream in flavour.

In Ecuador, Inga edulis is known as guaba de bejuco and, the other popular species there, Inga spectabilis , as guaba de machete.

== Use in agroforestry ==
Alley cropping techniques using species of Inga have been developed to restore soil fertility, and thereby stem the tide of continual slashing and burning of the rainforest. Species which have proven effective for alley cropping include Inga edulis and Inga oerstediana. Much of the research was done by Mike Hands at Cambridge University over a 20-year period. Inga species are also commonly used as shade trees for coffee, cocoa, and tea.

== Other uses ==
Its fruit is also prized for its sweet, vanilla flavored white pulp. It is often used as lumber in construction and furniture making.

== Gallery ==
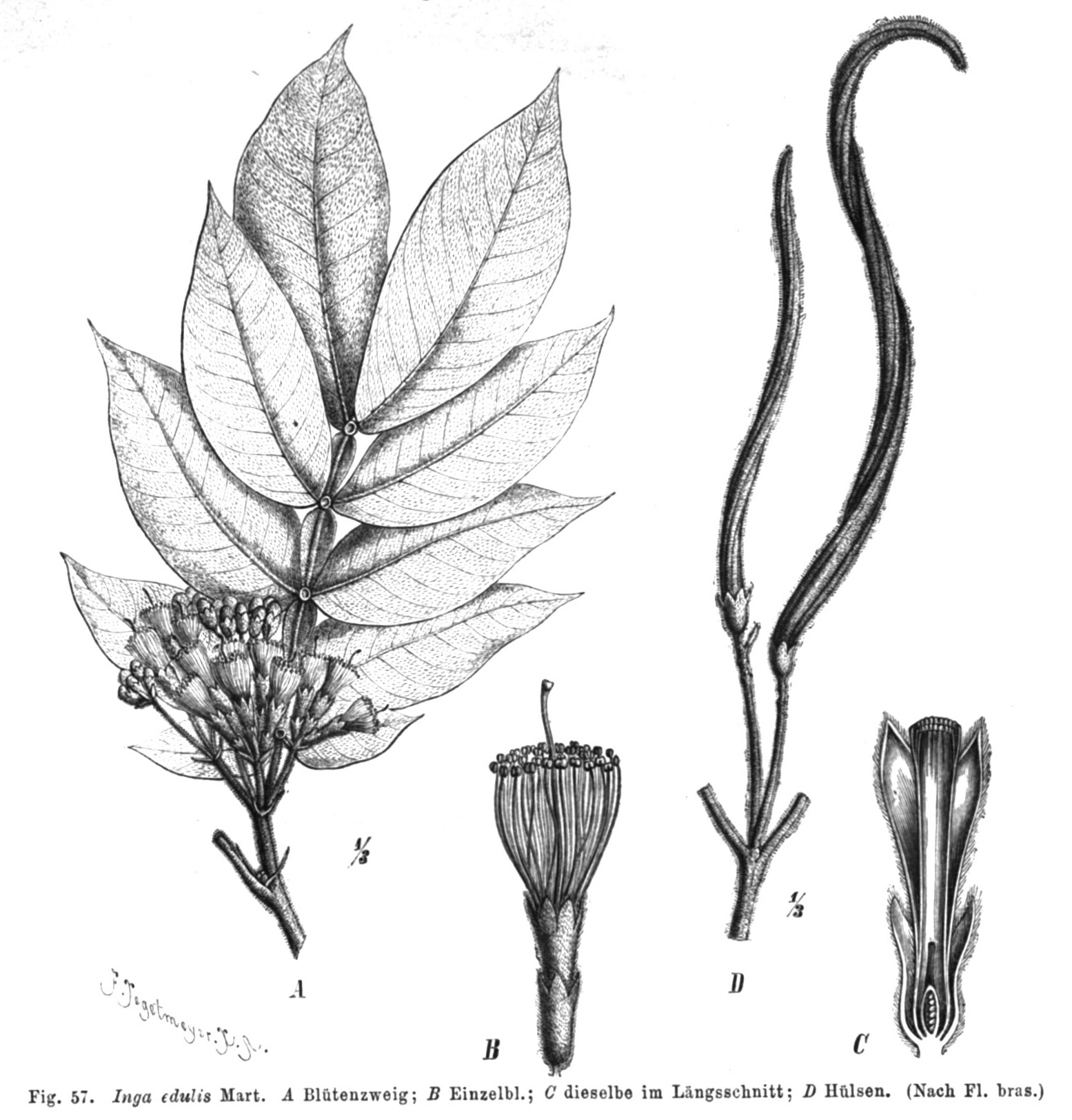
Ice-cream-bean (Inga edulis) parts drawing

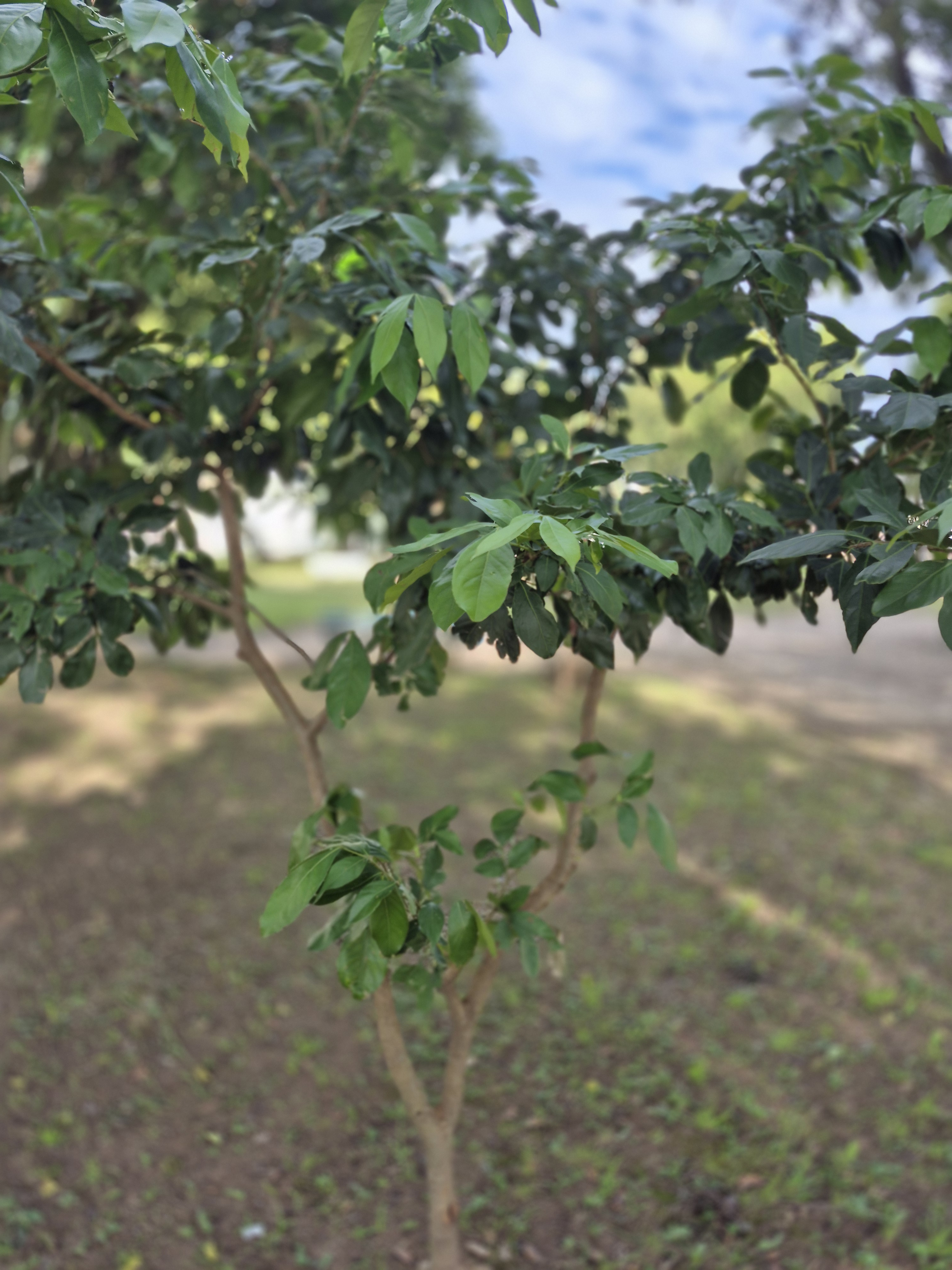
Young tree

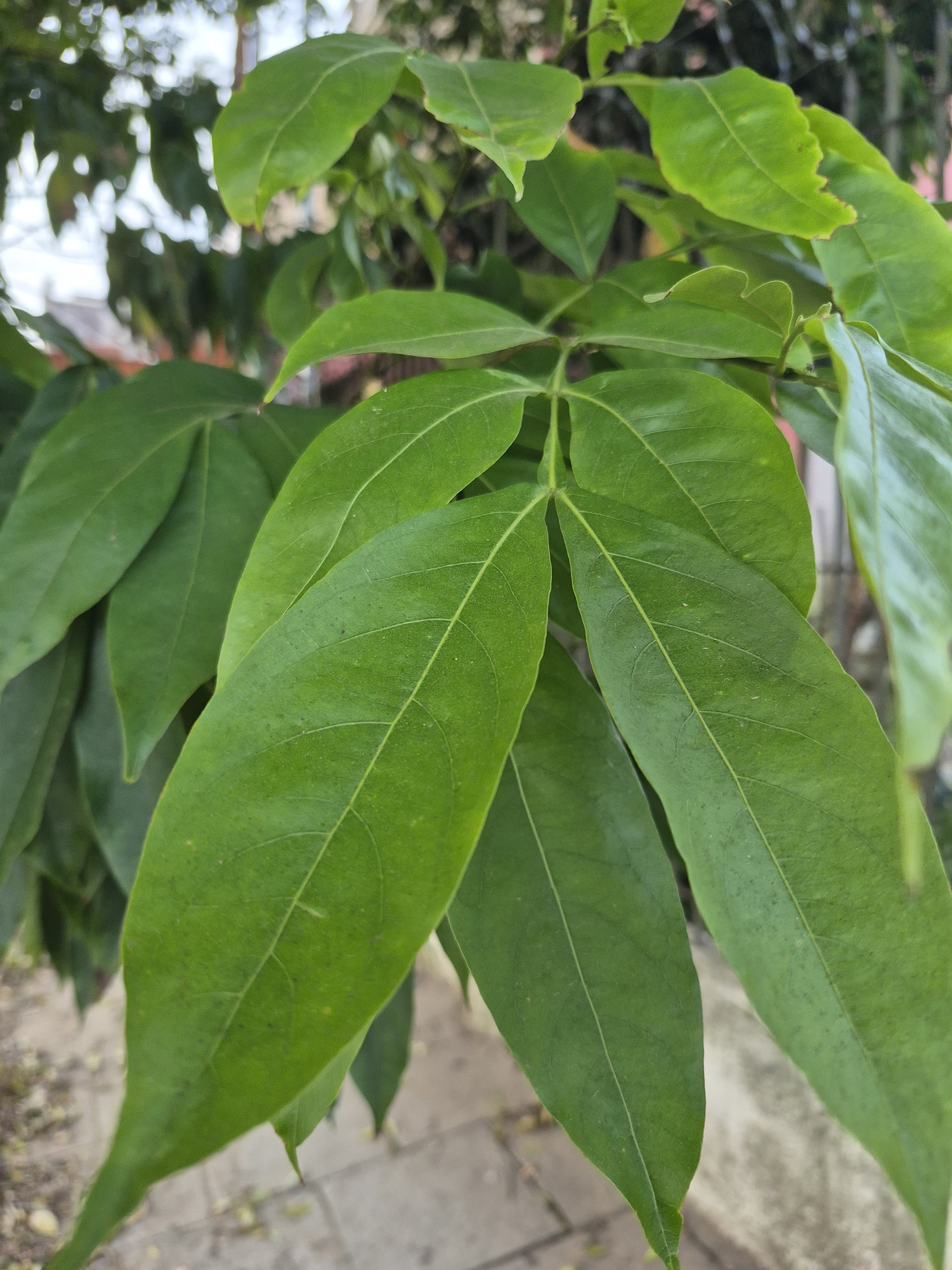
Leaves

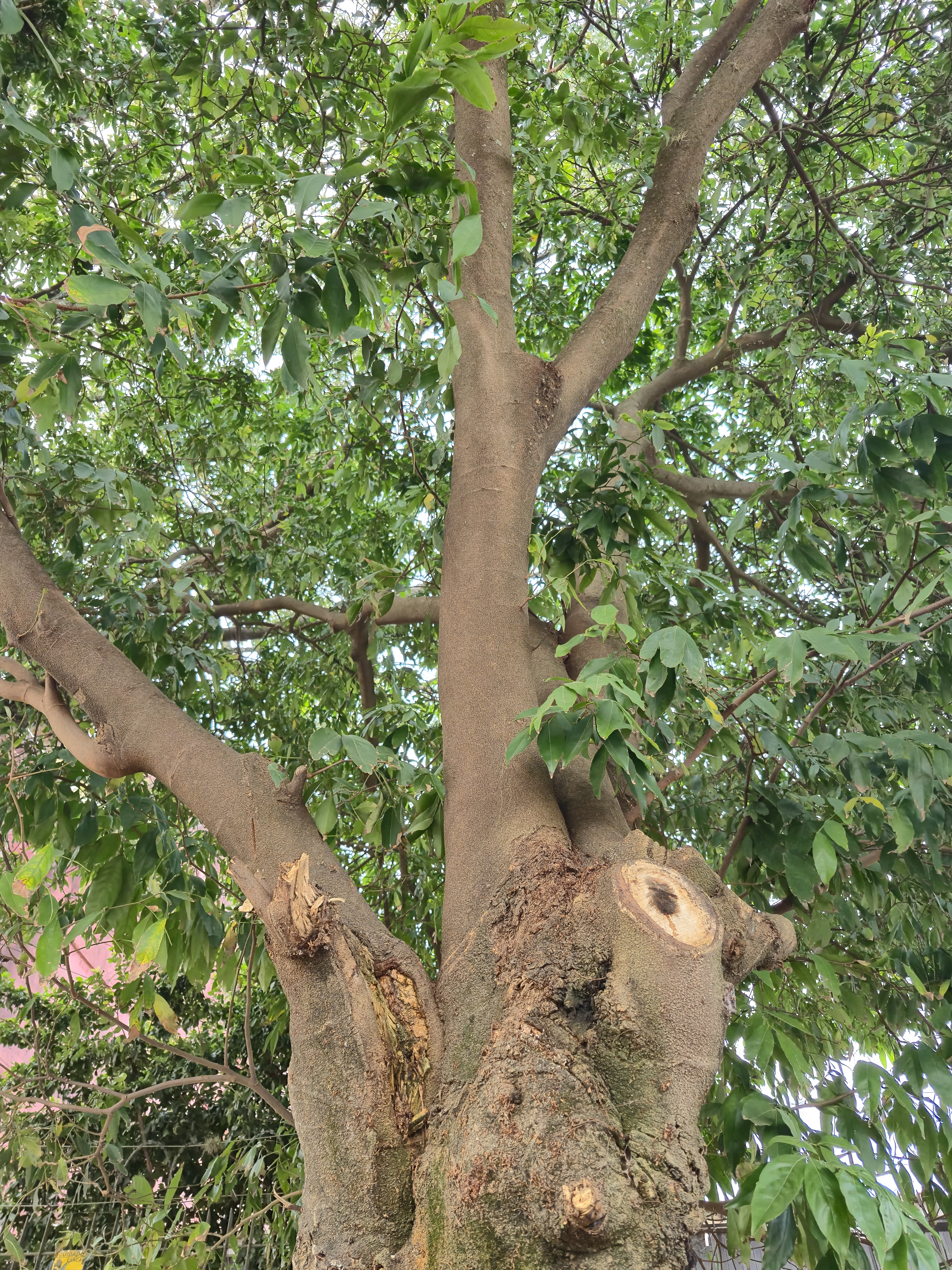
Bark

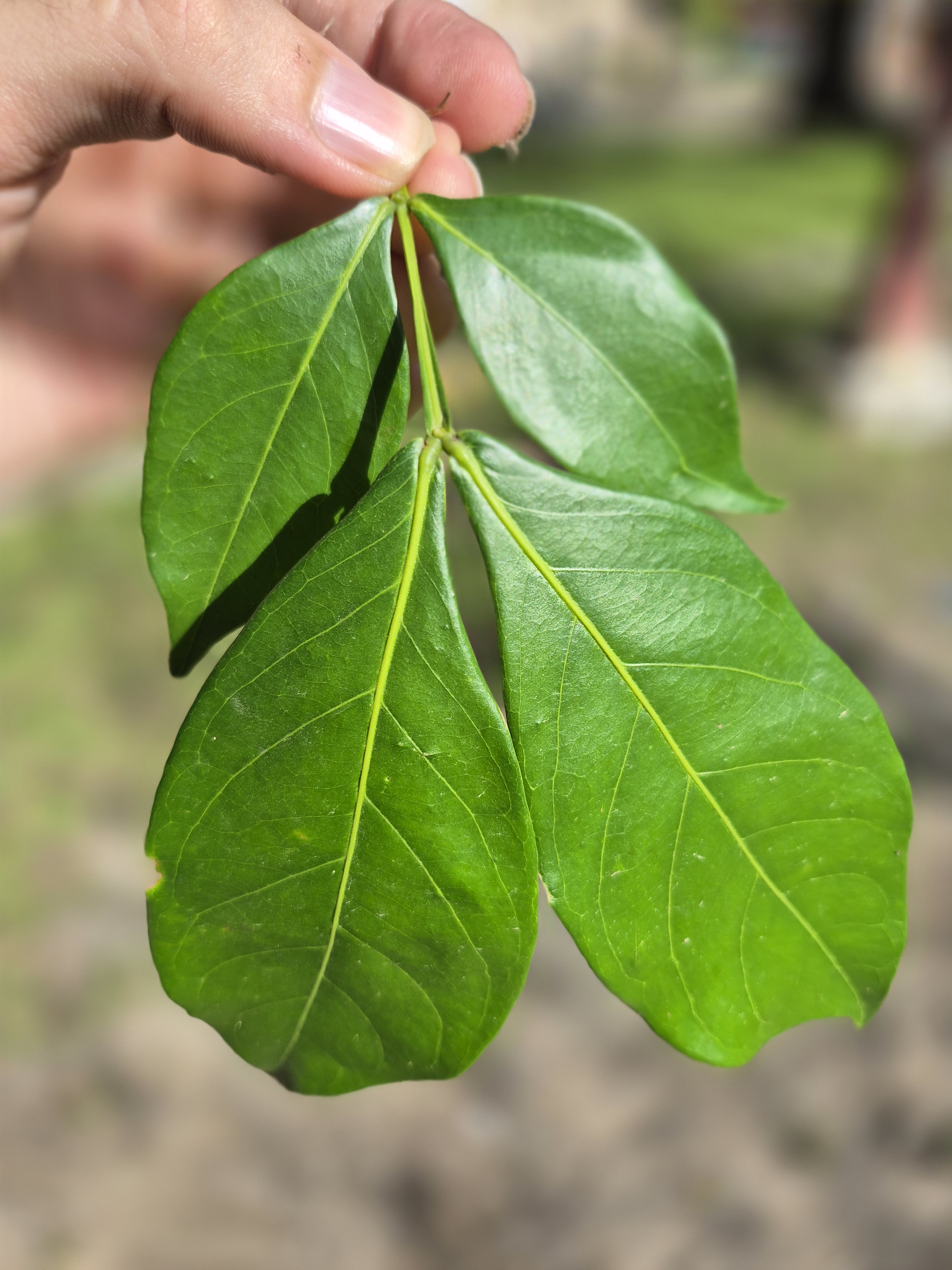
Typical Inga leaf (Inga sp.)

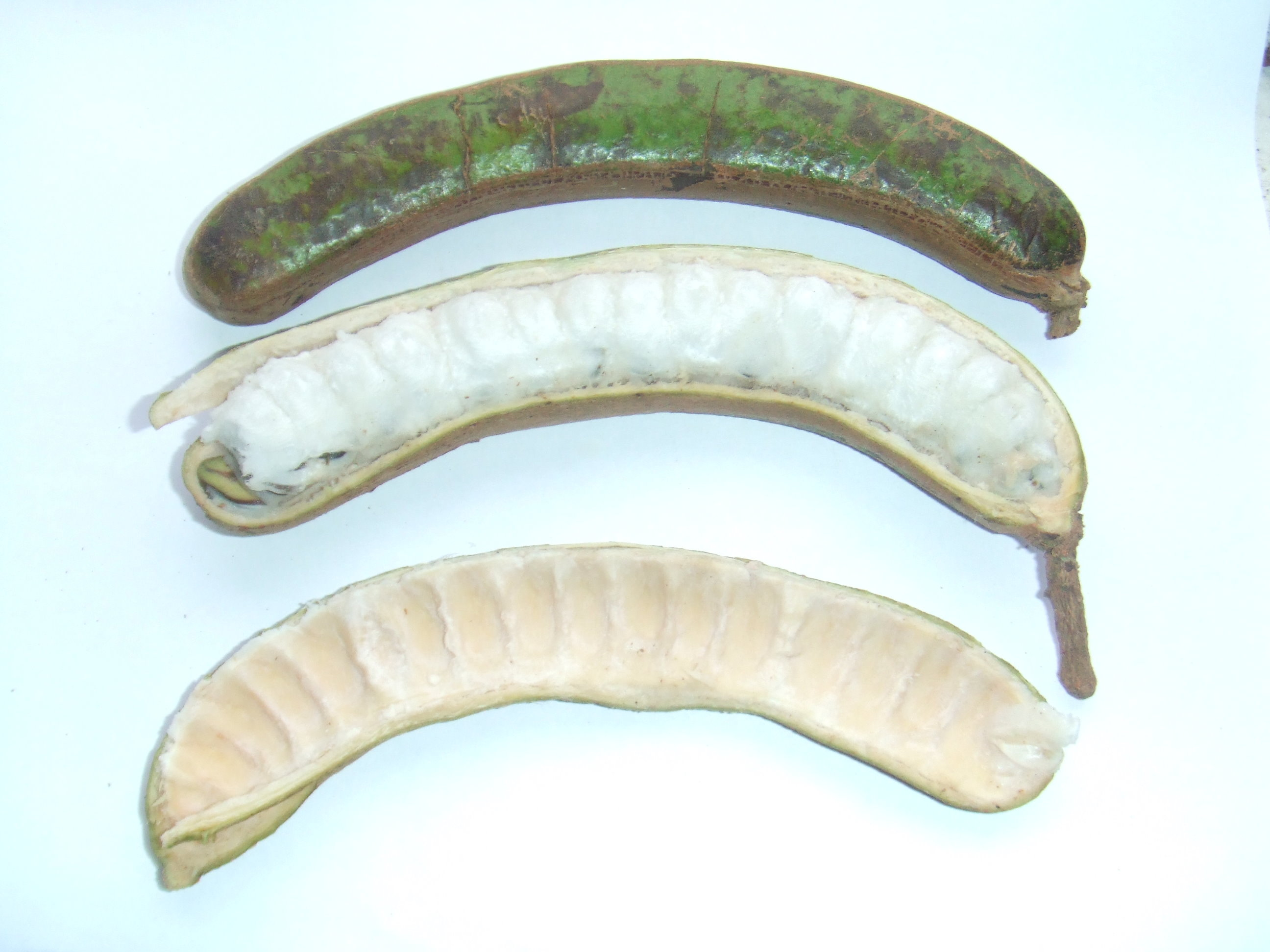
Fruit of an Inga-species

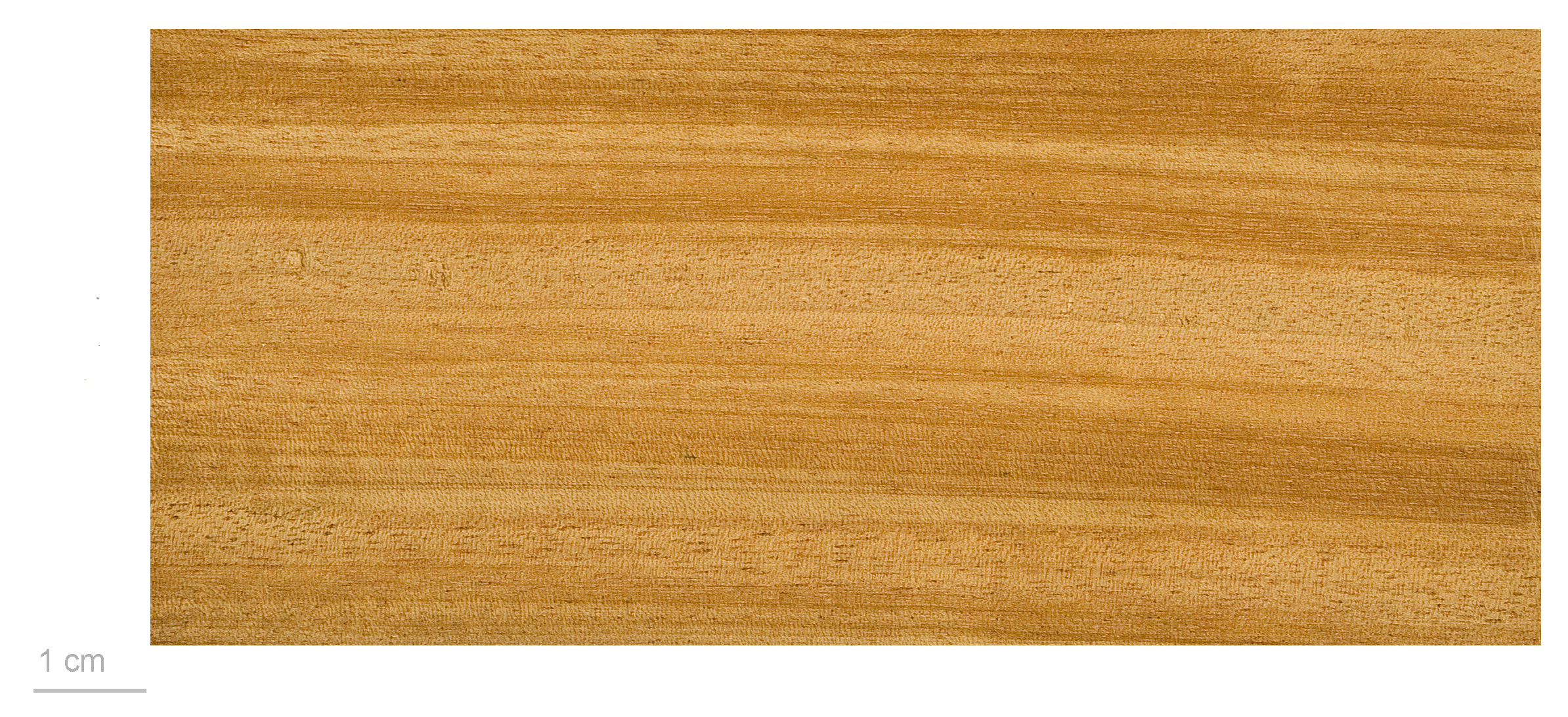
Inga sp. – MHNT

== See also ==
- List of Inga species
