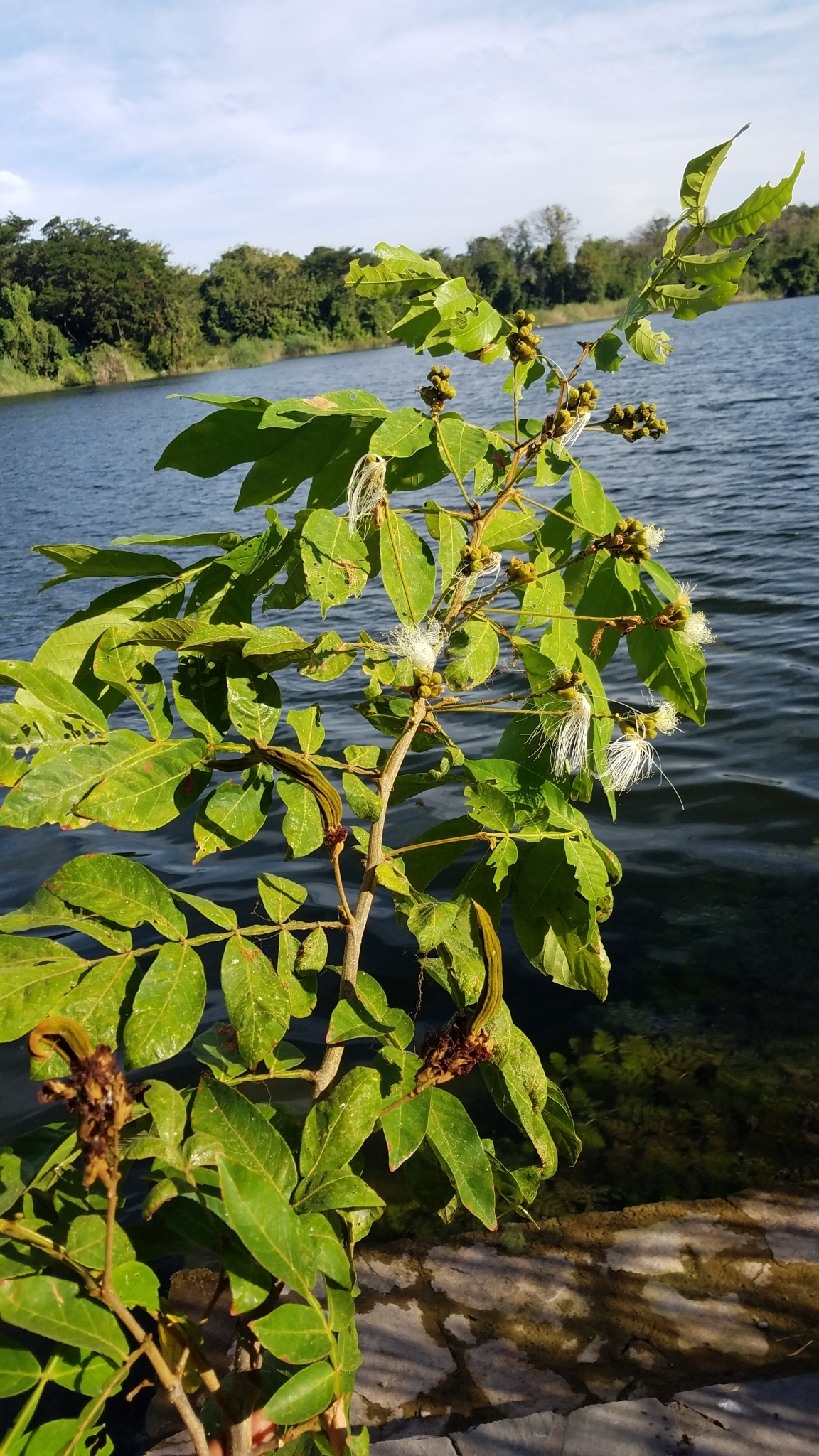

Scientific classification
- Kingdom: Plantae
- Clade: Tracheophytes
- Clade: Angiosperms
- Clade: Eudicots
- Clade: Rosids
- Order: Fabales
- Family: Fabaceae
- Subfamily: Caesalpinioideae
- Clade: Mimosoid clade
- Genus: Inga
- Species: I. vera

Binomial name
- Inga vera Willd.

Synonyms
- Feuilleea inga (L.) Kuntze; Mimosa inga L.; Inga inga (L.) Britton

= Inga vera =

Species of legume

Inga vera is a species of tropical tree in the family Fabaceae. It occurs in Central and South America, where it is known as churimo, guamo churimo, guamo arroyero and guamo macho.
