= Rice polyculture =

Growing rice with other crops

Rice polyculture is the cultivation of rice and another crop simultaneously on the same land. The practice exploits the mutual benefit between rice and organisms such as fish and ducks: the rice supports pests which serve as food for the fish and ducks, while the animals' excrement serves as fertiliser for the rice. The result is an additional crop, with reduced need for inputs of fertiliser and pesticides. In addition, the reduction of pests such as mosquito larvae and snails may reduce mosquito-borne diseases such as malaria and dengue fever, and snail-borne parasites such as the trematodes which cause schistosomiasis. The reduction in chemical inputs may reduce environmental harms caused by their release into the environment. The increased biodiversity may reduce methane emissions from rice fields.

Some rice–animal polycultures, including rice–fish systems in China and rice–duck farming in China and Southeast Asia, have been practised for centuries, while others have been developed more recently. The use of intercropping with plants such as maize and soybean, planted on levees between rice terraces, may help to reduce rice pests such as brown planthopper.

== History ==
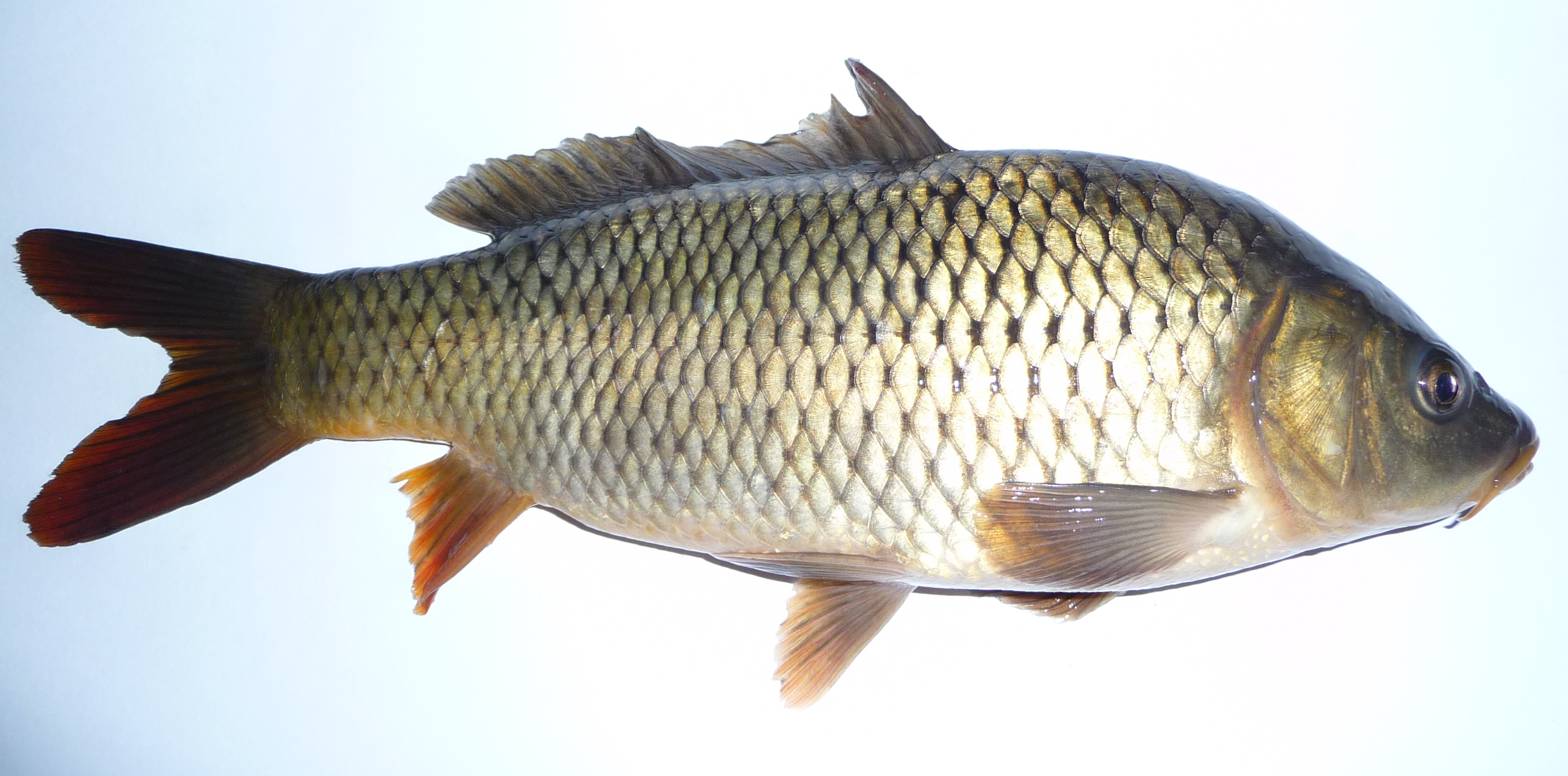
Common carp may have been the first fish in rice–fish systems.

The simultaneous cultivation of rice and fish is thought to be over 2,000 years old. Ancient clay models of rice fields, containing miniature models of fish such as the common carp, have been found in Han dynasty tombs in China. The system originated somewhere in continental Asia such as in India, Thailand, northern Vietnam and southern China. The practice likely started in China since they were early practitioners of aquaculture.

Rice–duck farming is traditional in Southeast Asia; in China it is sometimes combined with fish on the same terraces.

== Mutualism ==
Diagram of interactions within a rice polyculture, in this case rice–fish, showing mutual benefits of the crops and advantages to the farmer

Several animal species have been raised in rice fields, offering the possibility of multiple crops and a variety of ecological and agro-ecological benefits. Pairings such as rice and fish or rice and ducks form a mutualistic relationship: they both benefit from growing together. The rice provides the fish with shelter and shade and a reduced water temperature, along with herbivorous insects and other small animals that feed on the rice. Rice benefits from nitrogenous waste from the fish, while the fish reduce insect pests such as brown planthoppers, diseases such as sheath blight of rice, and weeds. By controlling weeds, competition for nutrients is decreased. CO_{2} released by the fish may be used in photosynthesis by the rice.

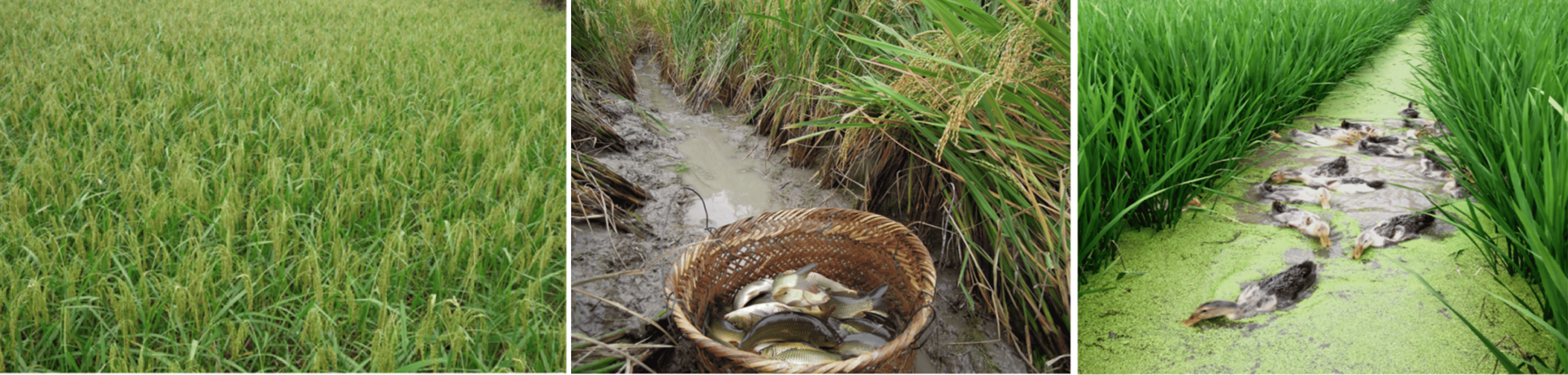
Rice–fish–duck system in China - glutinous rice, domesticated carp, Xiaoxiang ducks

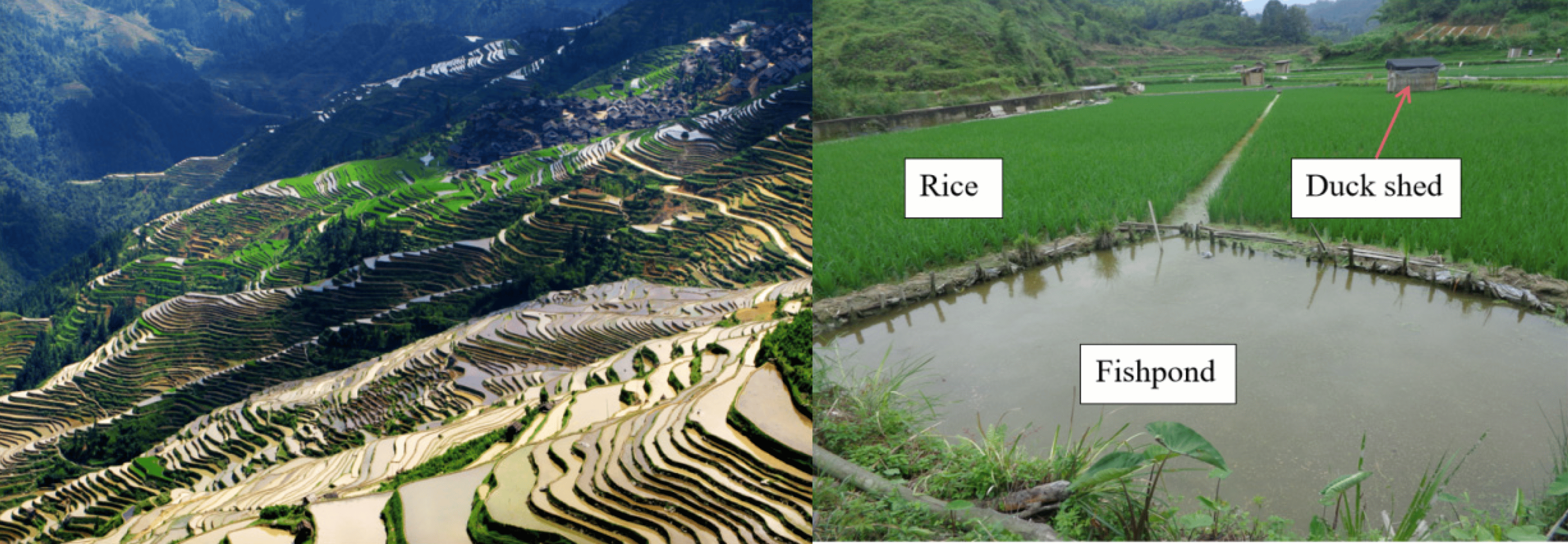
Rice–fish–duck system in China - Congjiang Dong rice terraces - rice paddy, fishpond, duck shed

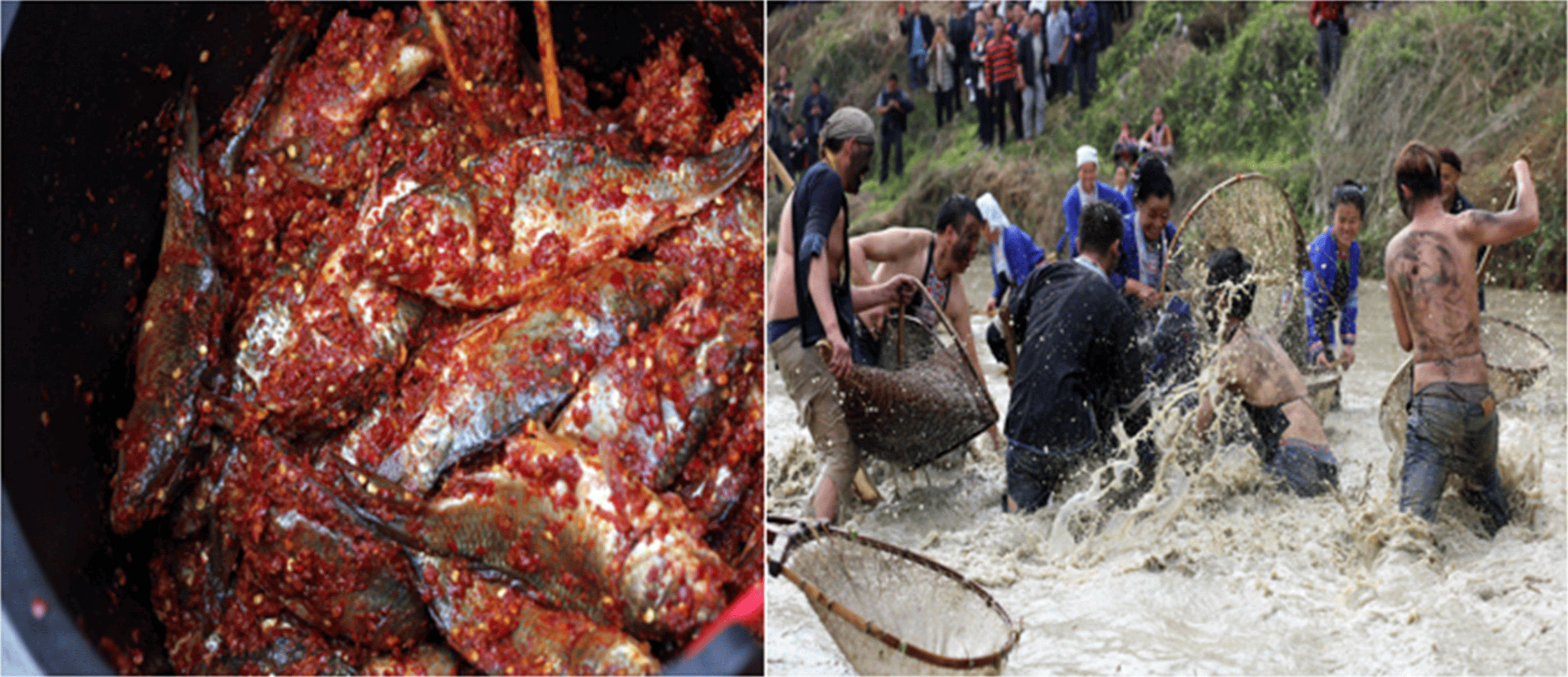
Rice–fish–duck system in China - salted fish - catching fish

== With other plants ==
Rice is widely grown using periodic flood irrigation, restricting the options for polycultures with other plants. Maize and soybeans are more profitable than rice, and they can be grown on the earth levees between rice terraces. There is some evidence that such intercropping reduces numbers of brown planthopper, a serious pest of rice, though it does not enhance numbers of natural enemies such as parasitoid wasps and insect predators.

One crop that can be grown directly with irrigated rice is water spinach (Ipomoea aquatica, Convolvulaceae family); it is widely consumed as a vegetable in Asia. Experimental intercropping with rice reduced rice diseases and pests: rice sheath blight was cut by 17–50%, while rice leaf folder caterpillars were reduced by 5–58%, and rice yield was increased. Similarly promising experiments have been carried out with pickerelweed.

== Taxonomic range ==
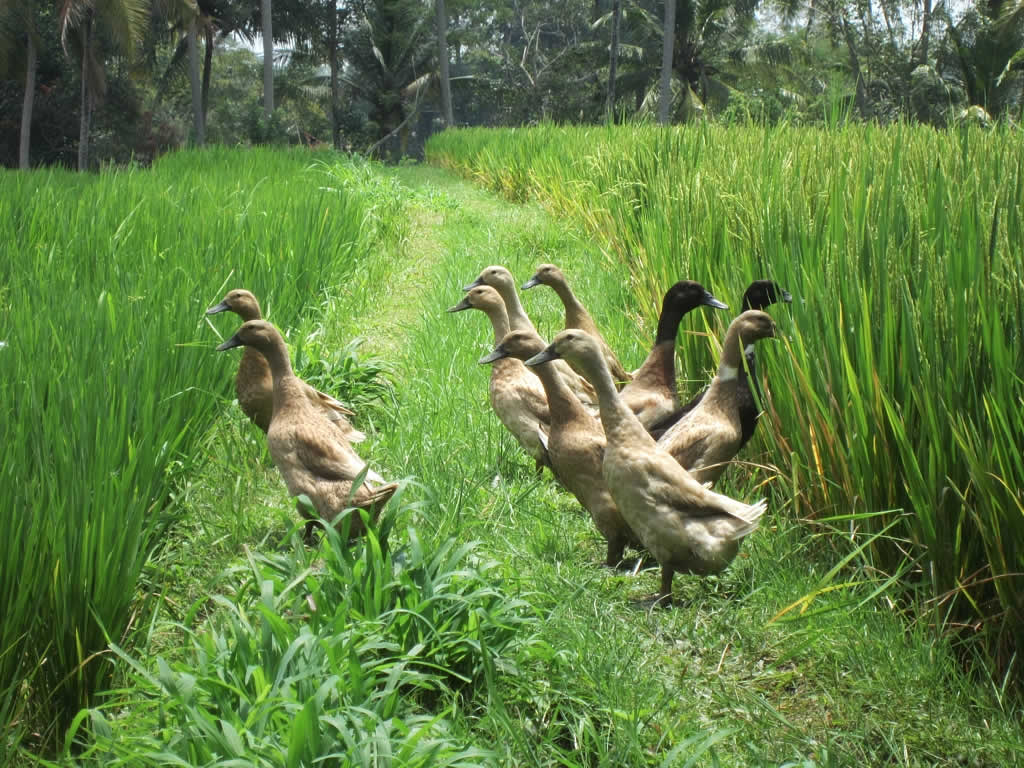
Indian Runner ducks with free access to rice paddies in Bali, Indonesia provide additional income and manure the fields, reducing the need for fertiliser.

As shown in the table, a large number of rice polycultures, with both animals and plants, have been used or studied experimentally.

Rice polycultures
Approach	Taxonomy	Location	Notes
Rice–fish	Teleost	China	Ancient system with common carp; from 1935, also other species inc. black carp, grass carp, silver carp, bighead carp
Rice–fish	Teleost	Asia	Mozambique tilapia
Rice–fish	Teleost	Egypt	Nile tilapia
Rice–duck	Bird	China, Malaysia, South Korea, Vietnam, etc.	Surface must be even; water depth must suit ducks; young ducks best as they do not damage rice leaf tips.
Rice–fish–duck	Vertebrates	China	Ancient multiply-mutualistic system
Rice–fish–duck–azolla	Vertebrates, ferns	Indonesia	Azolla (water fern) fixes nitrogen, contributing to plant growth and productivity.
Rice–crayfish	Arthropod	China	red swamp crayfish, from 1980s
Rice–prawn	Arthropod	Indonesia	Freshwater prawn Macrobrachium rosenbergii; may work best at moderate stocking density. Deepwater rice, prawns, and fish: increases rice production.
Rice–crab	Arthropod	China	Chinese mitten crab, from 1980s. The crabs feed on zooplankton.
Rice–turtle	Reptile	China	softshell turtle, from 1980s
Rice–maize	Flowering plant	China	Maize on levees may reduce planthopper numbers
Rice–soybean	Flowering plant	China	Soybean on levees may reduce planthopper numbers
Rice–water spinach	Flowering plant	China	Successful experiments
Rice–pickerelweed	Flowering plant	China	Experimentally reduces sheath blight and leaf folders, and increases rice yield.
Rice–fish	Cyprinidae	Nagaland, India	Common carp, Channa, and snails

== Sustainability ==
Rice polycultures offer the potential to help meet multiple sustainability goals in the face of pressures such as population growth and climate change. They may help maintain ecosystem diversity, produce food sustainably with reduced inputs, and adapt to changes in the environment. The inclusion of crops that provide high-quality protein, such as fish, can help to improve people's diet. In addition, environmental impacts from pesticides and fertilizers can be reduced, while for the farmer, the extra crop increases revenue and may also increase rice productivity.

== Sources ==
- Halwart, Matthias; Gupta, Modadugu Vijay (2004). Culture of fish in rice fields. Food and Agriculture Organization and WorldFish Center, Penang, Malaysia. ISBN 983-2346-33-9.
