= Rice–fish system =

Agricultural system

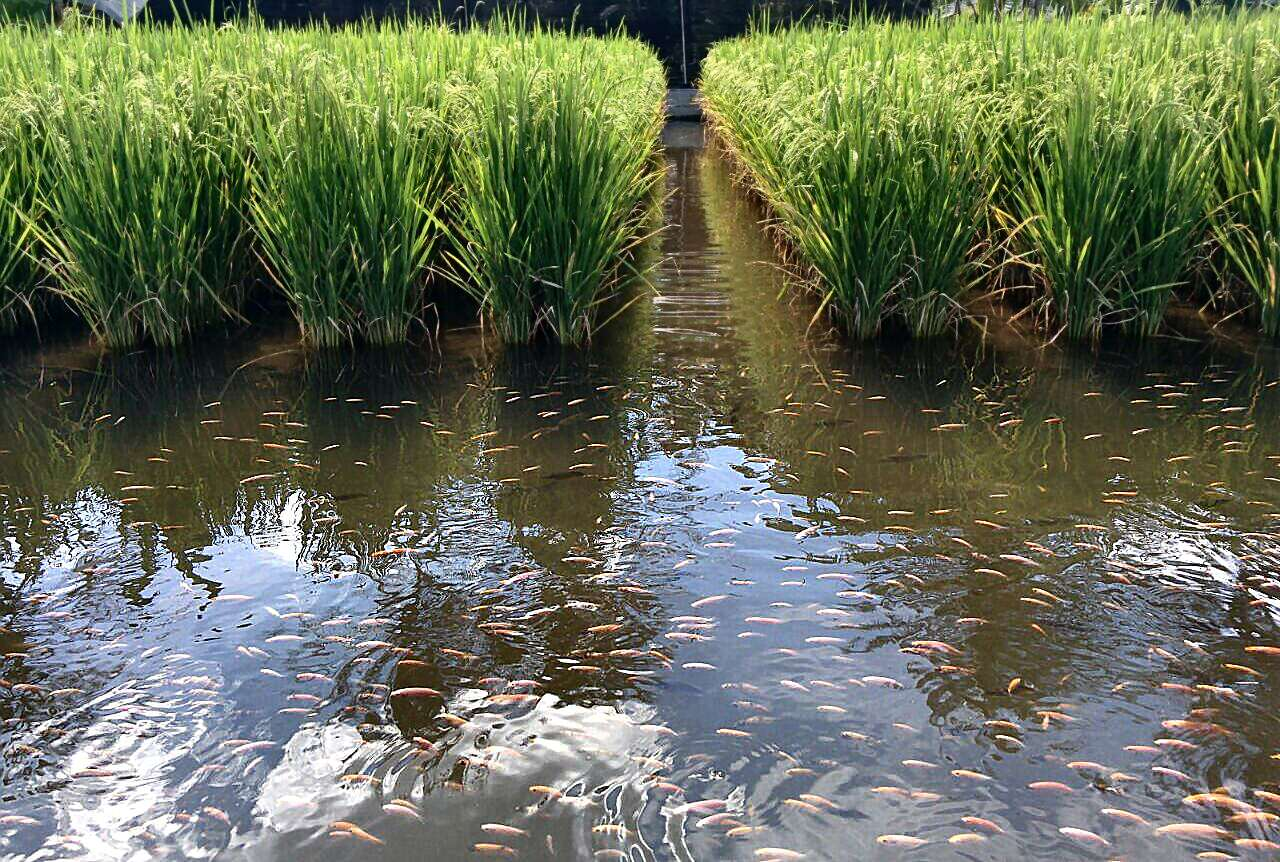
Rice and tilapia fish polyculture, Java

A rice–fish system is a rice polyculture, a practice that integrates rice agriculture with aquaculture, most commonly with freshwater fish. It is based on a mutually beneficial relationship between rice and fish in the same agroecosystem. The system was recognized by the FAO in 2002 as one of the first Globally Important Agricultural Heritage Systems.

The benefits of rice–fish systems include increased rice yield, the production of an additional (fish) crop on the same land, diversification of farm production, increased food security, and reduced need for inputs of fertilizer and pesticide. Because fish eat insects and snails, the systems may reduce mosquito-borne diseases such as malaria and dengue fever, and snail-born parasites such as the trematodes which cause schistosomiasis. The reduction in chemical inputs may reduce environmental harms caused by their release into the environment. The increased biodiversity may reduce methane emissions from rice fields.

== History ==
The simultaneous cultivation of rice and fish is thought to be over 2,000 years old. Ancient clay models of rice fields, containing miniature models of fish such as the common carp (Cyprinus carpio), have been found in Han dynasty tombs in China. The system originated somewhere in continental Asia such as in India, Thailand, northern Vietnam and southern China. The practice likely started in China since they were early practitioners of aquaculture.

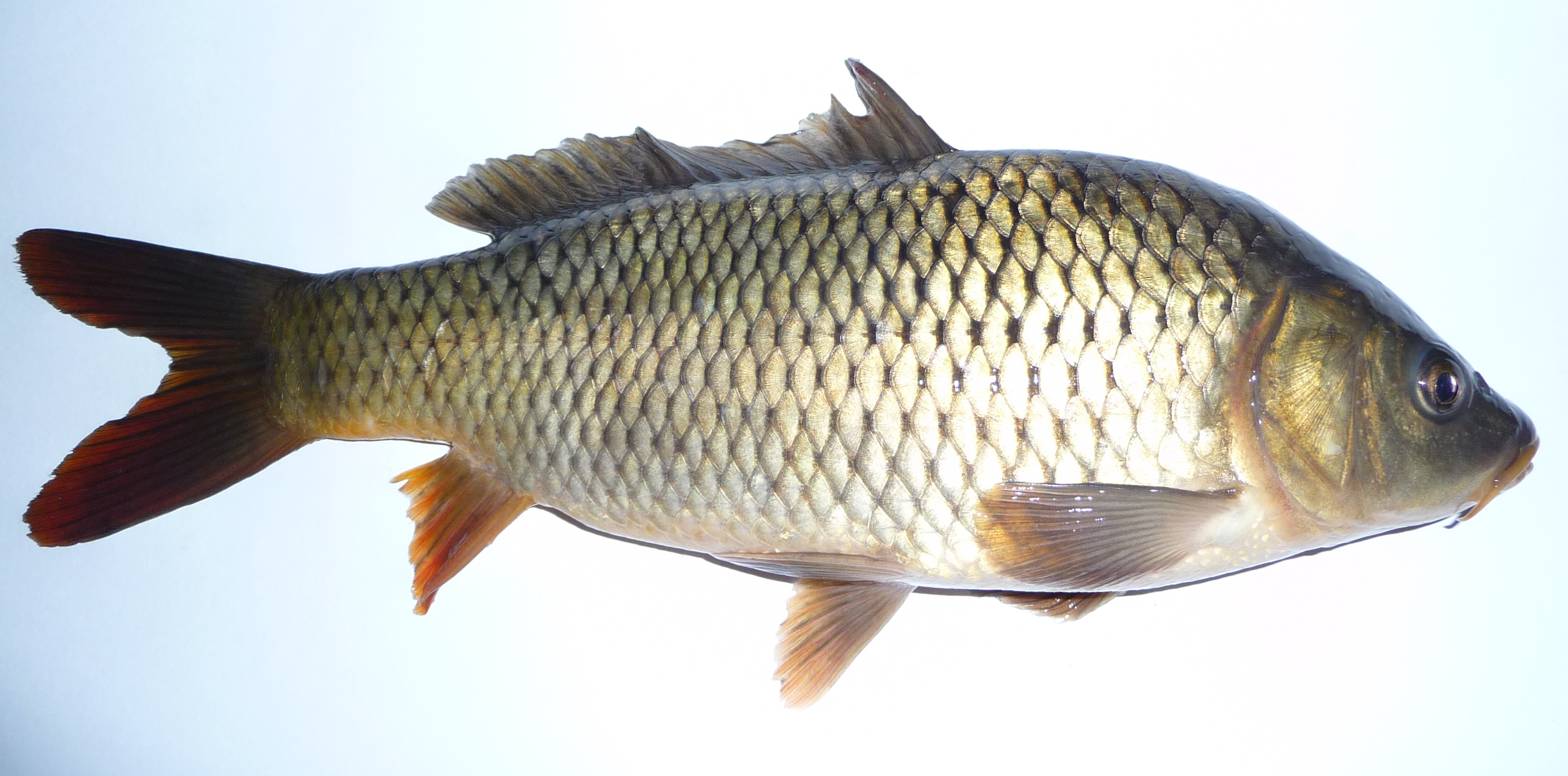
Carp may have been the first fish in rice–fish systems.

Carp were probably among the first fish used in rice–fish systems. Wei dynasty records from 220 to 265 AD mention that "a small fish with yellow scales and a red tail, grown in the rice fields of Pi County northeast of Chengdu, Sichuan Province, can be used for making sauce". Liu Xun wrote the first descriptions of the system, with texts written during 900 AD in the Tang dynasty. Rice–fish systems may have evolved from pond culture in China; one theory proposes that the practice started when farmers decided to place excess fry in their ponds and found the results beneficial. The practice may have developed independently from China in other Asian countries; there is evidence that it spread from India to neighbouring Asian countries over 1,500 years ago.

The practice slowly gained popularity among farmers, and by the mid-1900s, over 28 countries on all continents except Antarctica used rice–fish systems. Historically, the common carp was the most commonly used fish, with the Mozambique tilapia (Oreochromis mossambicus) in second place. As the practice spread throughout the world, new species were adopted. For example, Malaysia introduced the snakeskin gourami (Trichogaster pectoralis) and Egypt used the Nile tilapia (Oreochromis niloticus). An early study, in Jiangsu Province in 1935, found that placing black carp (Mylopharyngodon piceus), grass carp (Ctenopharyngodon idella), silver carp (Hypophthalmichthys molitrix, 'silverfin'), bighead carp (Aristichthys nobilis) and common carp together with rice was beneficial. Rice–fish systems were traditionally low maintenance, growing additional animal protein alongside the staple food, rice. The space used for fish–rice systems in China grew from 441,027 hectares (1,089,800 acres) to 853,150 hectares (2,108,200 acres) and the production increased dramatically, going from 36,330 tonnes to 206,915 tonnes between 1983 and 1994. In 2002, the rice–fish system became one of the first Globally Important Agricultural Heritage Systems to be recognized by the FAO.

== Principle ==
=== Mutualism ===
Diagram of rice–fish system interactions, showing mutual benefits of the crops and advantages to the farmer

Rice and fish form a mutualistic relationship: they both benefit from growing together. The rice provides the fish with shelter and shade and a reduced water temperature, along with herbivorous insects and other small animals that feed on the rice. Rice benefits from nitrogenous waste from the fish, while the fish reduce insect pests such as brown planthoppers, diseases such as sheath blight of rice, and weeds. By controlling weeds, competition for nutrients is decreased. CO_{2} released by the fish may be used in photosynthesis by the rice.

The constant fish movements allow for the loosening of the surface soil which can:

- Improve oxygen levels by increasing the amount of dissolved oxygen. Consequently, the activity of microorganisms is increased and they generate more usable nutrients, which will allow an increased nutrient uptake for the rice.
- Increase mineralization of the organic matter.
- Optimization of nutrient release in the soil.
- Promote fertilizer decomposition and therefore fertilizer effectiveness.
- Better root development of the rice.

Soil fertility is improved by the integration of fish, whose manure is a fertilizer recycling organic matter, nitrogen, phosphorus and potassium. The inclusion of fish in rice-fields helps to maintain soil health, biodiversity, and productivity.

The aquatic diversity in rice–fish systems includes phytoplankton, zooplankton), soil benthic fauna and microbial populations; all of these play a role in enhancing soil fertility and sustaining long-term production. However, benthic communities may be disturbed by constant grazing by the fish.

=== Application as a polyculture ===
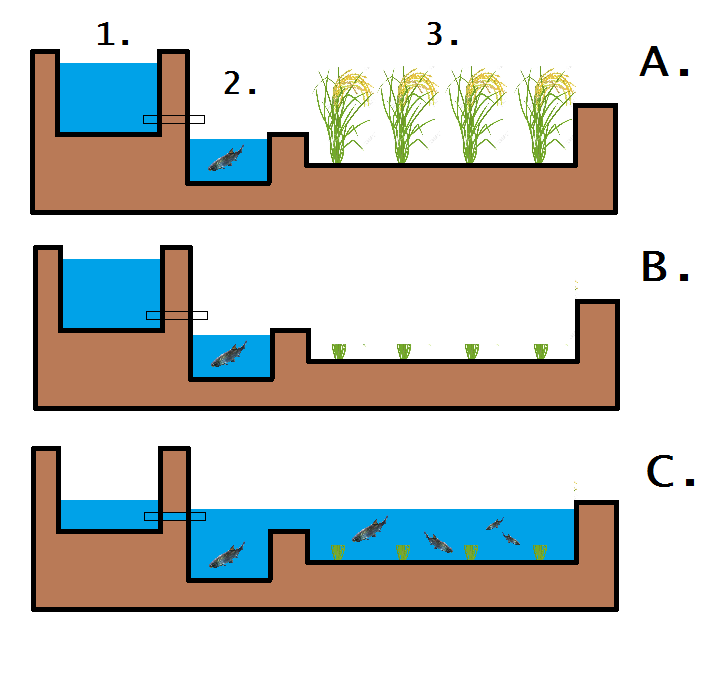
Design of a rice–fish system with channels. A: Before harvest B: After harvest C: Re-flooding

Rice–fish systems are polycultures based on the potential for mutual benefit. To put this into practice, channels are added in the previously flat rice fields to allow the fish to continue growing even during rice harvest and dry seasons.

Before creating the rice field, the field is treated with 4.5–5.25 tonnes per hectare (2.0–2.3 short ton/acre) of organic manure. Organic manure is applied again during the main growing season, with about 1.5 tonnes per hectare (0.7 short ton/acre) applied every 15 days. This provides nutrients for rice and the added cultures of plankton and benthos that feed the fish. During the main growing season, supplementary feeds complement the plankton and benthos culture and are used once or twice a day. The supplementary feeds include fish meal, soybean cake, rice bran and wheat bran. Fish are stocked at a rate between 0.25 and 1 per square metre (1,000–4,000/acre).

Unwanted fish or invasive species can threaten the mutualistic relationship between rice and fish, and therefore reduce productivity. For example, in the integrated Rice–Swamp Loach Aquaculture Model, catfish, snakeheads (Channa argus) and paddy eels (Monopterus albus) are considered as unwanted species. Predatory birds are a threat; bird netting can be used to protect the fish.

== Benefits ==
=== Economic ===
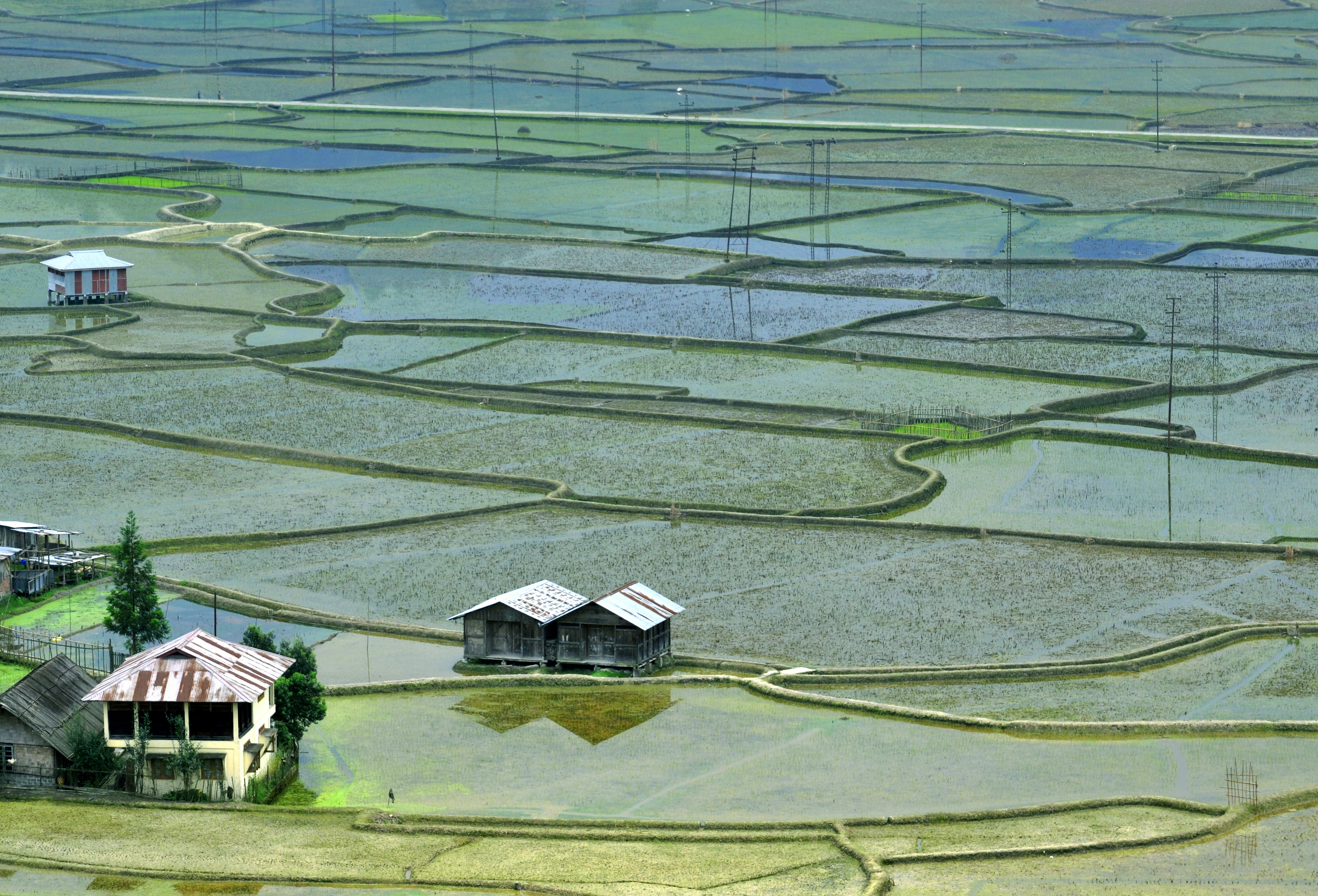
Rice–fish farming landscape in Arunachal Pradesh, Northeast India

Net gains vary between and within countries. Overall, integrated rice–fish fields have a positive impact on net returns. In Bangladesh, net returns are over 50% greater than in rice monocultures. In China, the net return by region is between 45 and 270% greater. A case of loss in net returns was found in Thailand with only 80% of the profitability of rice monocultures. This might be caused by the initial investment needed when starting the system. The use of rice–fish systems has resulted in an increase in rice yields and productivity from 6.7–7.5 tonnes per hectare (3.0–3.3 short ton/acre) and simultaneously also from 0.75–2.25 tonnes per hectare (0.3–1.0 short ton/acre) of fish. Rice–fish systems form a possible tourist attraction, as the practice creates a distinctive landscape. The addition of fish diversifies the farm's production, increases food security, and generates income; Halwart and Gupta comment that if it also increases rice yield and cuts the need for fertilizer and pesticide inputs, these are "added bonus[es]".

=== Public health ===
In 1981, the Health Commission of China recognised integrated rice fields as a possible measure to decrease the population of mosquitoes, which carry diseases such as malaria and dengue fever. The larvae density is reduced in integrated rice fields since freshwater fishes routinely prey on the larvae. Rice–fish systems may decrease the number of snails, known to carry trematodes which in turn cause schistosomiasis. Farmers' diets may improve with the addition of fish protein. Reduced antibiotic resistance is another possible benefit; bacteria in rice–crayfish systems have a lower frequency and a lower diversity of antibiotic resistance genes than aquaculture systems without rice.

=== Environmental ===
As fish control pests and weeds, fewer chemicals (such as pesticides and herbicides) are used, reducing the release of these agricultural chemicals into the environment. Paddies with fish have been measured to require 24% less fertilizer input and 68% less pesticide usage than rice grown alone. In addition, farmers often choose not to use pesticides, to avoid harming the fish.

In turn, biodiversity is increased. For example, the addition of common carp (Cyprinus carpio) to a rice monoculture increased the number of energy transfer pathways by 78.69%, while the energy transfer efficiency increased by 67.86%.

In addition, rice–fish systems can reduce methane emissions compared to rice monoculture. Rice paddyfields are agriculture's main contributors to greenhouse gases, which contribute to climate change, mainly because when flooded, as they often are on a regular cycle, they support methanogenic bacteria; overall, paddyfields contribute around 10% of the global greenhouse effect. Rice–fish systems may be able to contribute to global-scale reduction of methane emissions.

== Applications ==
=== Developing countries ===
In the 2010s, rice–fish systems were exported to less developed countries with the FAO/China Trust fund. About 80 Chinese rice–fish experts were sent to underdeveloped countries in diverse regions of the world such as certain African countries, other parts of Asia and in the South Pacific to implement the rice–fish systems and their benefits as well as share their agriculture knowledge. For example, the China–Nigeria South-South Cooperation programme integrated over 10,000 hectares (25,000 acres) of rice–fish fields in Nigeria, which has allowed for the production of rice and tilapia to almost double.

=== Climate resilience ===
Climate change threatens global food production as it creates numerous changes to regional weather, such as higher temperatures, heavy rainfall, and storms. These changes may cause outbreaks of pests with, for example, an increase in the number of plant hoppers and stem borers. Rice–fish systems offer the potential for benefit in future climates because they have higher reliability and stability than rice monoculture in the face of changing weather patterns. The diversified agroecosystem is likely to be more resilient to climate change, making better use of resources and supporting a range of ecosystem services.

== Alternatives ==
Rice–fish systems are the most common type of integrated rice-field polyculture. However, some 19 other models exist, including rice–duck, rice–crayfish, rice–crab and rice–turtle. From the 1980s on, the diversity of Chinese rice polycultures developed rapidly, involving new species such as the Chinese mitten crab, the red swamp crayfish, and softshell turtles.

== Sources ==
- Halwart, Matthias; Gupta, Modadugu Vijay (2004). Culture of fish in rice fields. Food and Agriculture Organization and WorldFish Center, Penang, Malaysia. ISBN 983-2346-33-9.
