= Heterospinus =

Scientific classification
- Kingdom: Animalia
- Phylum: Acanthocephala
- Class: Palaeacanthocephala
- Order: Polymorphida
- Family: Polymorphidae
- Genus: Heterospinus; Rothman, Hill-Spanik, Wagner, Kendrick, Kingsley-Smith, & de Buron, 2024
- Species: H. mccordi

Binomial name
- Heterospinus mccordi Rothman, Hill-Spanik, Wagner, Kendrick, Kingsley-Smith, & de Buron, 2024

Genus of parasitic worms

Heterospinus is a monotypic genus of acanthocephalans (thorny-headed or spiny-headed parasitic worms) containing a single species, Heterospinus mccordi.

== Taxonomy ==
The species was described by Rothman, Hill-Spanik, Wagner, Kendrick, Kingsley-Smith, & de Buron in 2024. A phylogenetic analysis has been published.

== Description ==
Based on a sample of cystocanths only, Heterospinus mccordi consists of a proboscis covered in hooks and a trunk.

== Distribution ==
The distribution of Heterospinus mccordi is determined by that of its hosts, which is unknown. Cystecanths were found in the red swamp crayfish in South Carolina.

== Hosts ==
Life cycle of Acanthocephala. (Note: There are no known aberrant human infections for Heterospinus mccordi species.)

The life cycle of an acanthocephalan consists of three stages beginning when an infective acanthor (development of an egg) is released from the intestines of the definitive host and then ingested by the invasive red swamp crayfish the intermediate host. When the acanthor molts, the second stage called the acanthella begins. This stage involves penetrating the wall of the mesenteron or the intestine of the intermediate host and growing. The final stage is the infective cystacanth which is the larval or juvenile state of an Acanthocephalan, differing from the adult only in size and stage of sexual development. The cystacanths within the intermediate hosts are consumed by the definitive host, usually attaching to the walls of the intestines, and as adults they reproduce sexually in the intestines. The acanthor is passed in the feces of the definitive host and the cycle repeats. There may be paratenic hosts (hosts where parasites infest but do not undergo larval development or sexual reproduction) for Heterospinus.

The definitive host for Heterospinus mccordi is not known, only the intermediate host red swamp crayfish (Procambarus clarkii). There are no reported cases of Heterospinus mccordi infesting humans in the English language medical literature.

Hosts for Heterospinus mccordi

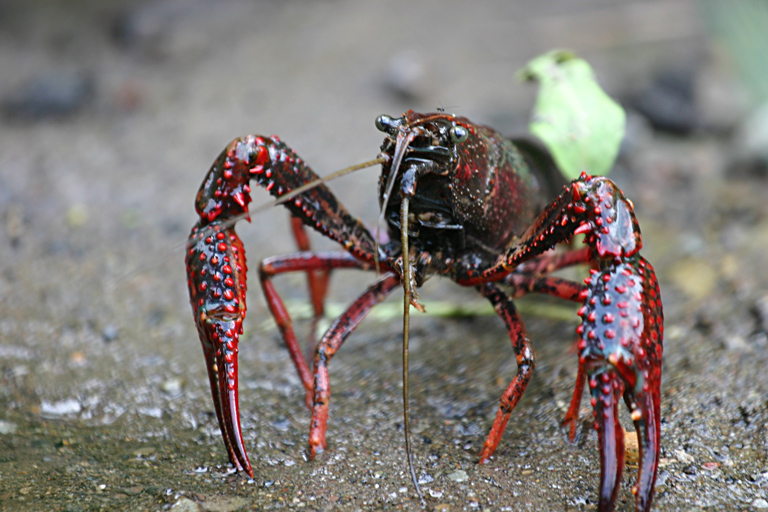
The red swamp crayfish is an intermediate host of H. mccordi
