= Takao Furuno =

Takao Furuno (born 1950) is a Japanese farmer, social entrepreneur, philanthropist, private aid volunteer, and pioneer of the duck-rice farming, known as aigamo in Japanese.

== Biography ==
Born in 1950, Takao Furuno lives in Fukuoka Prefecture, Kyushu, Japan, a rural region west of the Japanese archipelago. A small farmer, he was one of the first to begin using organic farming methods in Japan, starting in 1978. By his account, he found in Rachel Carson’s famous book, Silent Spring, the motivation to take his farm in a new direction. He obtained a PhD in Kyushu University.

== Evolution of the aigamo method ==
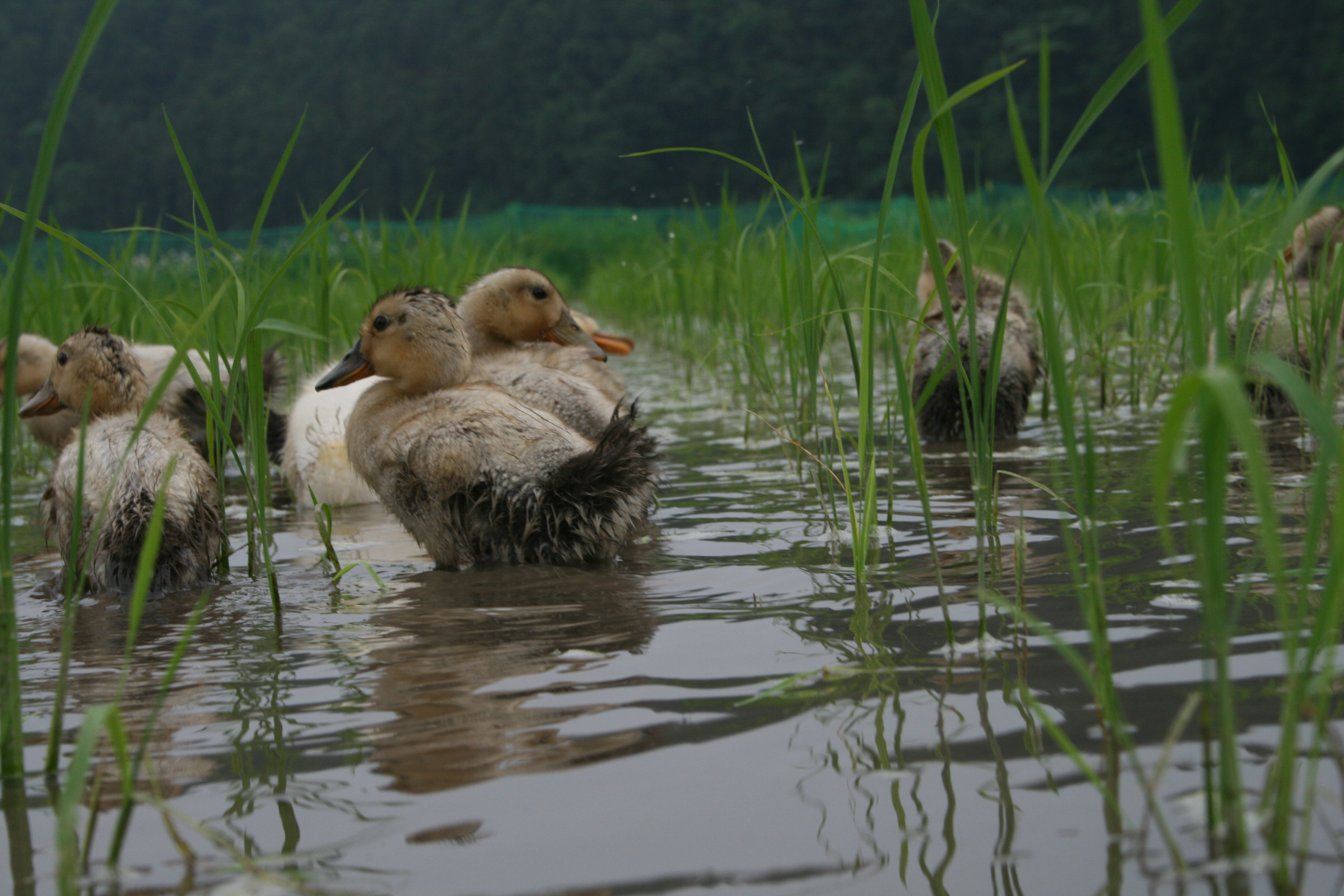
Aigamo ducks in rice paddy—合鴨農法

After ten years of using organic farming practices, Furuno learned of a traditional Japanese rice farming method that consisted of using ducks to eliminate the weeds in rice fields, the "Aigamo Method." His first experiment was a success, but not without problems. In this system, ducklings are introduced into rice paddies for the purpose of (1) providing natural fertilizer, (2) to strengthen the rice seedlings by oxygenating the water from the turbulence caused by the ducklings' swimming actions, as well as (3) to weed and eat insects. One season, disease destroyed Furuno's entire crop. For three years, dogs ate his ducks until he installed electric fences. Then, Furuno had to ward off birds of prey, who would fly into the paddies for a quick meal.

By continuous observation and research, however, Furuno was able to identify the optimal age at which ducklings should be released into rice fields (7 days), the number that should be introduced for every tenth of a hectare (15-30), and the moment when the ducklings should be removed from working in a paddy (8 weeks) so as not to eat the rice. Through experimentation, he discovered, too, that the addition of loaches (a type of freshwater fish) and the nitrogen-fixing weed Azolla to the fields boosted rice and duck growth, and simultaneously supplied nutrition for the ducks. Wires strung at intervals across the fields deterred the birds of prey.

By 1989, he had re-engineered the method into a sustainable, integrated organic rice and duck farming system that could be replicated. Today, Furuno produces crop yields without the use of chemicals that equal or surpass those of farmers still using conventional methods. Furuno has successfully marketed duck rice, which now sells at a 20-30% premium over conventionally grown rice in Japan and other countries. Today, his 3.2-hectare farm produces rice, organic vegetables, eggs, ducks, and ducklings.

Through his writings, travels, lectures and cooperation with agricultural organizations and governments, his methods have spread to more than 75,000 farmers in Japan, Korea, China, Vietnam, the Philippines, Laos, Cambodia, Malaysia, Bangladesh, Iran, and Cuba. The adoption of this method boosts a farmer's income, decreases their workload, and reduces environmental damage, while increasing local and regional food security. When the ducks are no longer needed, they are used as table birds or sold to add considerably to the family income and protein intake. Farmers using the aigamo method also have more time to spend with their family or doing other things. In the past, it has been estimated that manual weeding of paddies requires 240 person-hours per hectare every year.

== Publications ==
- Furuno, Takao. The Power of Duck: Integrated Rice and Duck Farming. Tagari Publications, 2002 ISBN 0908228120.
- Furuno, Takao. Aigamo Duck Cookbook. In Japanese. Nobunkyo, ISBN 4-540-98395-4.
- Furuno, Takao. The One-Duck Revolution. In English. Self-published on Lulu.com, 2012. ISBN 9781300076339.

ISBN 9781329202078.
