= Rice–duck farming =

Polyculture in Asia

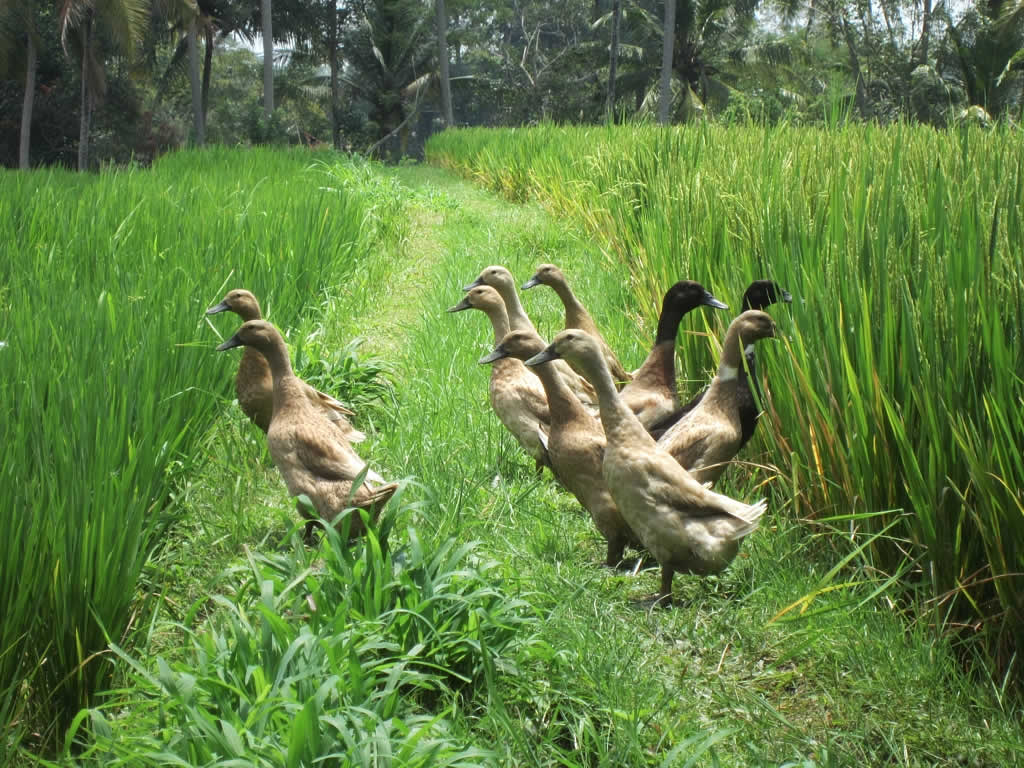
Indian Runner ducks with free access to rice paddies in Bali, Indonesia provide additional income and manure the fields, reducing the need for fertilizer.

Rice–duck farming is the polycultural practice of raising ducks and rice on the same land. It has existed in different forms for centuries in Asian countries including China, Indonesia, and the Philippines, sometimes also involving fish. The practice is beneficial as it yields harvests of both rice and ducks. The two are in addition synergistic, as the rice benefits from being weeded and fertilized by the ducks, and having pests removed, while the ducks benefit from the food available in the rice paddy fields, including weeds and small animals.

== Systems ==
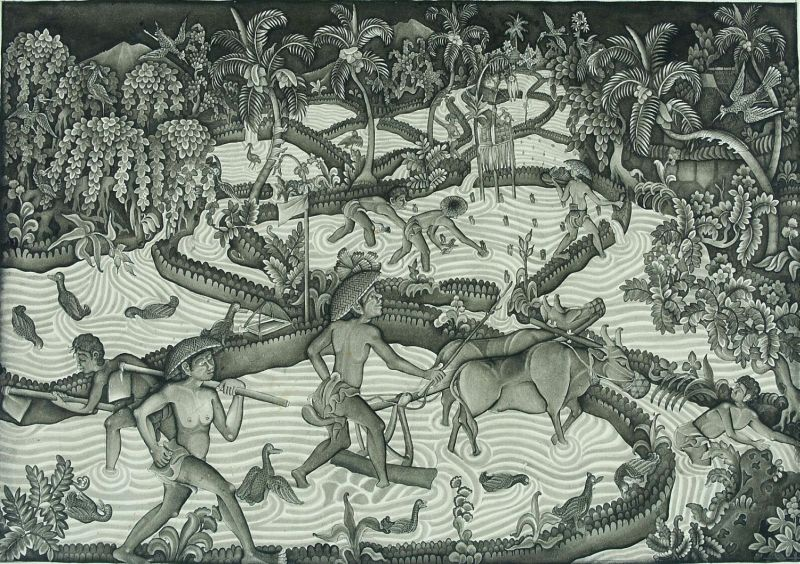
Balinese painting, c. 1940, in traditional style, depicting paddy fields with ducks foraging for food

In 2010, Asia produced around 90% of the world's rice, and in 2012 some 80% of all duck meat. Asian farmers had a tradition of fattening ducks on rice paddies, though this was achieved in different ways. Integrated rice–duck farming uses hybrid ducks such as Aigamo that avoid eating the leaves of rice plants. Such mutually beneficial polycultural systems have been described as permacultures.

Rice–duck systems
Approach	Location	Time	Effects	Constraints
Duck fattening	Common across tropical and subtropical Asia	After harvest	Not a polyculture. Ducks eat spilt rice grain and earthworms in dry field	Seasonal
Rice–duck	China, Malaysia, South Korea, Vietnam, etc.	While rice is growing	Ducks eat pests (e.g. brown planthoppers) in the crop; they stir water, limiting weeds, and manure the rice.	Surface must be even; water depth must suit ducks; young ducks best as they don't nibble rice leaf tips.
Rice–fish–duck	China	Fish bred on rice terraces	Fattens ducks and fish, controls pests, manures the rice.	Presence of fish limits use of pesticides.
Rice–fish–duck–azolla	Indonesia	While rice is growing	Fattens ducks and fish, controls pests, manures the rice.	Duck herder or fencing needed.

In 2001, rice–duck farming was introduced to Bangladesh, where the practice had been very limited. By 2004, it had been established in over 40 villages, either on small farms or on a "community basis" within a village.

== Analysis ==
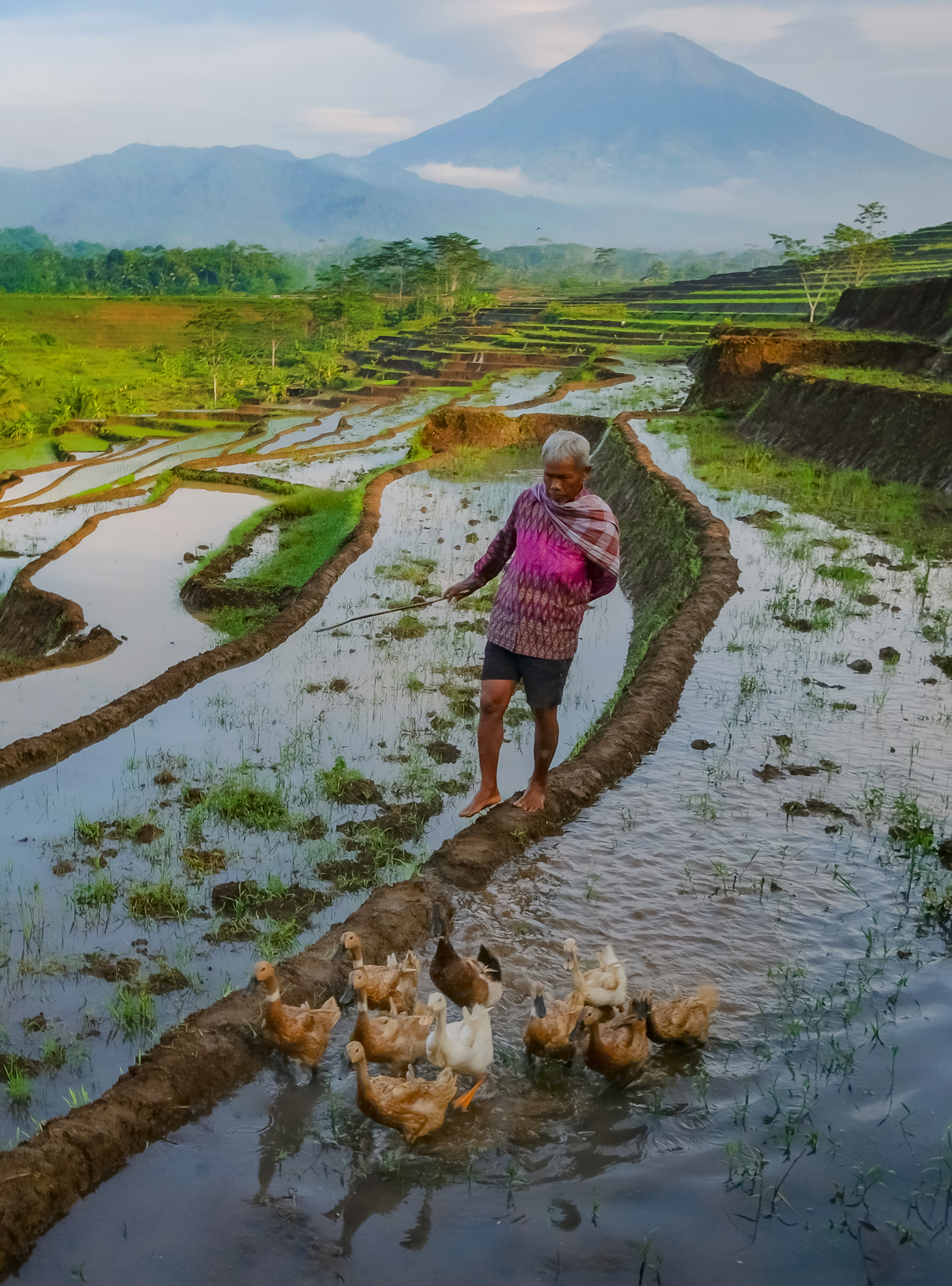
A farmer herds his ducks in the Ngendrosari rice fields, Kajoran, Magelang, Central Java

=== Advantages ===
The ducks eat weeds, preventing those plants from competing with the rice and limiting its growth. This reduces the need for herbicides, saving money and the labour of spraying, and reducing environmental harms such as eutrophication of waterways. Duck manure fertilizes the paddy fields, reducing the need for artificial fertilizers, again saving money and labour. Both soil nutrients and water parameters including nitrate, dissolved organic matter, dissolved oxygen, and suspended solids are higher because of duck manuring and dabbling in the soil, raising production and farm profits in comparison to rice farming without ducks (or fish).

=== Disadvantages ===
The addition of ducks requires labour and either a duck herder or additional fencing on the farm. Depending on the system, it may require the field to be more carefully managed, such as being flooded to the exact depth needed for ducks to swim freely but still able to dabble on the bottom.

== See also ==
- Rice–fish system
- Takao Furuno, rice–duck farm pioneer in Japan
