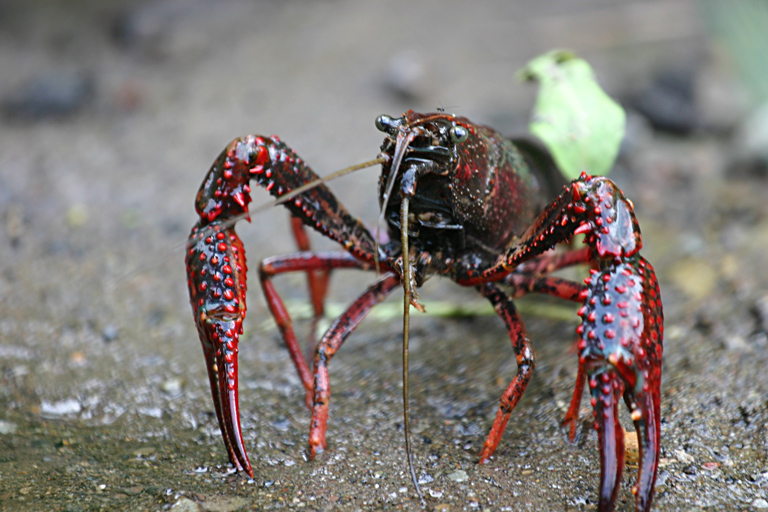

Conservation status
- Least Concern (IUCN 3.1)

- Secure (NatureServe)

Scientific classification
- Kingdom: Animalia
- Phylum: Arthropoda
- Clade: Pancrustacea
- Class: Malacostraca
- Order: Decapoda
- Suborder: Pleocyemata
- Family: Cambaridae
- Genus: Procambarus
- Species: P. clarkii

Binomial name
- Procambarus clarkii (Girard, 1852)

= Procambarus clarkii =

Species of crustacean

Procambarus clarkii, known variously as the red swamp crayfish, Louisiana crawfish or mudbug, is a species of cambarid crayfish native to freshwater bodies of northern Mexico, and southern and southeastern United States, but also introduced elsewhere (both in North America and other continents), where it is often an invasive pest.

== Appearance ==
P. clarkii is typically dark red, with long claws and head, small or no spines on the sides of its carapace just below the head, and rows of bright red bumps on the front and side of the first leg.

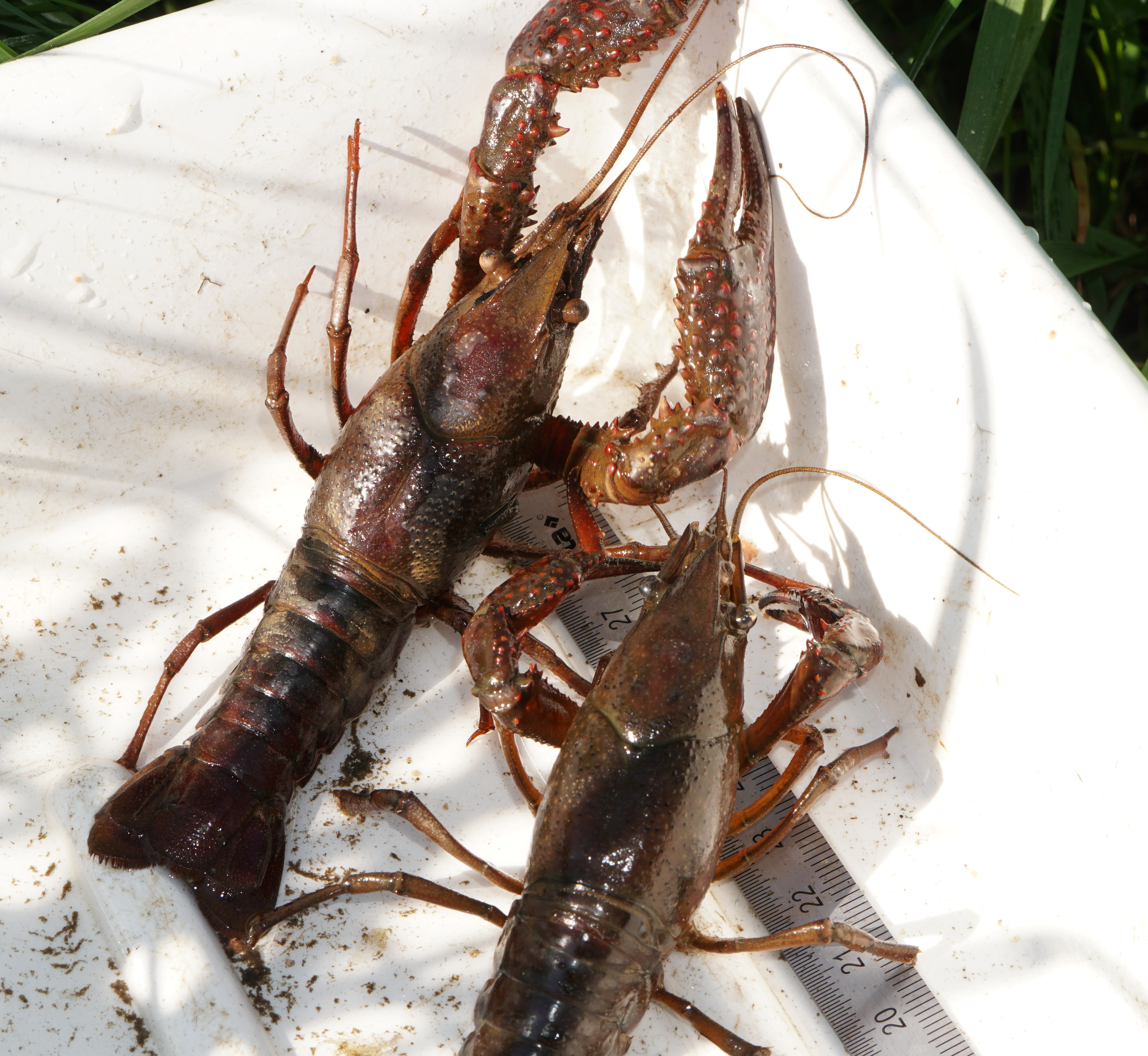
Male red swamp crayfish have bigger claws than females.

== Range and range expansion ==
The native range of P. clarkii is from northern Mexico and far southeastern New Mexico, through the Gulf States to the Florida Panhandle, as well as inland north through the Mississippi Basin to southern Illinois. It has also been introduced, sometimes deliberately, outside its natural range to countries in Asia, Africa, Europe and elsewhere in the Americas. In northern Europe, the populations are self-maintaining but not expanding, while in southern Europe, P. clarkii is multiplying and actively colonizing new territories at the expense of the native crayfish, Astacus astacus and Austropotamobius spp. In some areas this species occurs in sympatry with another invasive crayfish, Pacifastacus leniusculus. Individuals are reported to be able to cross many miles of relatively dry ground, especially in wet seasons, although the aquarium trade and anglers may have hastened the spread in some areas (anglers using P. clarkii as fishing bait are thought to have introduced it to the state of Washington). Attempts have also been made to use P. clarkii as a biological control organism, to reduce levels of the snails involved in the life cycle of schistosomiasis, leading to the dispersal of P. clarkii in, for instance, Kenya.

== Invasiveness ==
In Europe, P. clarkii has been included since 2016 in the list of Invasive Alien Species of Union concern (the Union list). This implies that this species cannot be imported, bred, transported, commercialized, or intentionally released into the environment in the whole of the European Union.

In Holland the species threatens the survival of rare dragonflies. Native birds enjoy it as a food source. The authorities are running a campaign to exterminate the crays from Dutch waters using traps that make the crays easy prey for the birds.

== Ecology ==
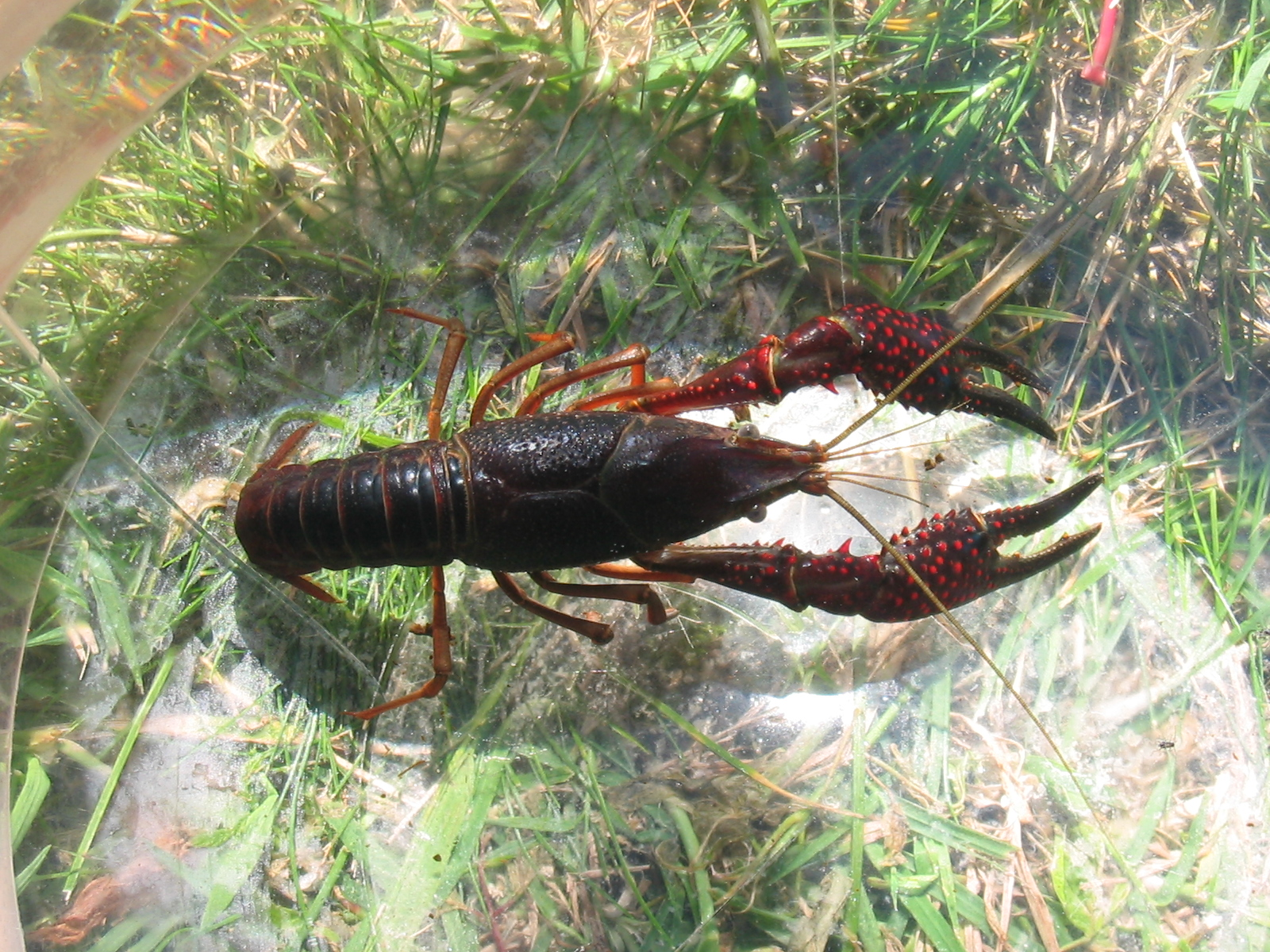
P. clarkii, dorsal view

P. clarkii is most commonly found in warm freshwater bodies such as slow-flowing rivers, marshes, reservoirs, irrigation systems and rice paddies. It is considered to be the most ecologically plastic species in the order Decapoda and is able to grow quickly even in only seasonally present water, being able to tolerate dry spells of up to four months. P. clarkii grows quickly, and is capable of reaching weights over 50 g (1.8 oz) and sizes of 5.5–12 cm (2.2–4.7 in) long. It is also able to tolerate salinties of up to 35ppt. Additionally, P. clarkii are physiologically capable of tolerating low dissolved oxygen concentrations.

The burrowing activities of P. clarkii can damage existing water courses and crops, particularly rice, and its feeding activities can disrupt native ecosystems. It may outcompete the native crayfish species and is a vector for the crayfish plague fungus Aphanomyces astaci, for crayfish virus vibriosis and for a number of parasitic worms on vertebrates. Their burrowing activities may also be a threat to civil infrastructure such as storm ponds and levees.

In 2007, troglomorphic specimens of P. clarkii were found in central Portugal in the karst springs of the Rio Anços in the Sicó massif and of the Alviela River in the Estremenho massiff. In 2011, another cave-dwelling population was discovered in caves in the San Giuliano Terme municipality in the Province of Pisa in Italy. Both localities consist of karst landscapes with extensive cave formations. The Portuguese population is entirely depigmented, although pigmented specimens are present in nearby surface streams; the deepest recorded specimen was a male recovered at a depth of 240 metres (790 ft). 53% of Italian specimens displayed a blue-white coloration. The greater presence of pigmented individuals suggests either a more recent entrance, an external source of carotenoids, or movement between surface and underground waters. Collectively, these potations make up the first recorded instances of troglodytic crayfish in Europe. The invasive crayfish have the potential to pose an environmental threat to native stygobitic fauna, due to the crayfish's recorded ability to prey on diverse sources of food and the highly restricted ranges of native cave fauna.

== Economic importance ==
Global aquaculture production of Procambarus clarkii in million tonnes from 1975 to 2022, as reported by the FAO

Harvests of P. clarkii for food account for a large majority of the crayfish produced in the United States and elsewhere. Crayfish farming began in Louisiana in the 18th century, taking place in rice fields in a concurrent or alternate culture system. The concurrent polyculture of rice and crayfish combination makes good use of land, resources, equipment and infrastructure already being used for rice production.

However, crayfish production in Louisiana has decreased in recent years due to an increase of imports from China, which is now the world's leading producer of farmed crayfish using a rice-based system. A number of species of crustaceans were introduced to China to create markets for aquaculture and because they are better adapted to growing in a rice field than native fish species. Rice-fish farming originated in China and is once again growing as the yields from Green Revolution practices used to grow rice are no longer increasing, and resources such as land and water are becoming more limited. Crayfish are also cultivated as animal feed for poultry farms, fish farms and Chinese edible frog farms, or used to add into organic fertilizers.

P. clarkii has also been introduced elsewhere for cultivation, such as Spain, where its success is attributable to its ability to colonize disturbed habitats that would be unsuitable for the native crayfish (Astacus astacus). P. clarkii is also marketed by biological supply companies for teaching and research. P. clarkii also exhibits different colour morphs, including white, blue and orange, which are commonly sold in pet stores.

The introduction of P. clarkii has also resulted in economic losses in some regions. In the Baixo Mondego region of Portugal, it caused a decrease in 6.3% of profits in rice fields. However, this was on a wet-seeded field. All negative effects of crayfish can be avoided if adult crayfish are separated from the seed and seedlings.

=== As food ===
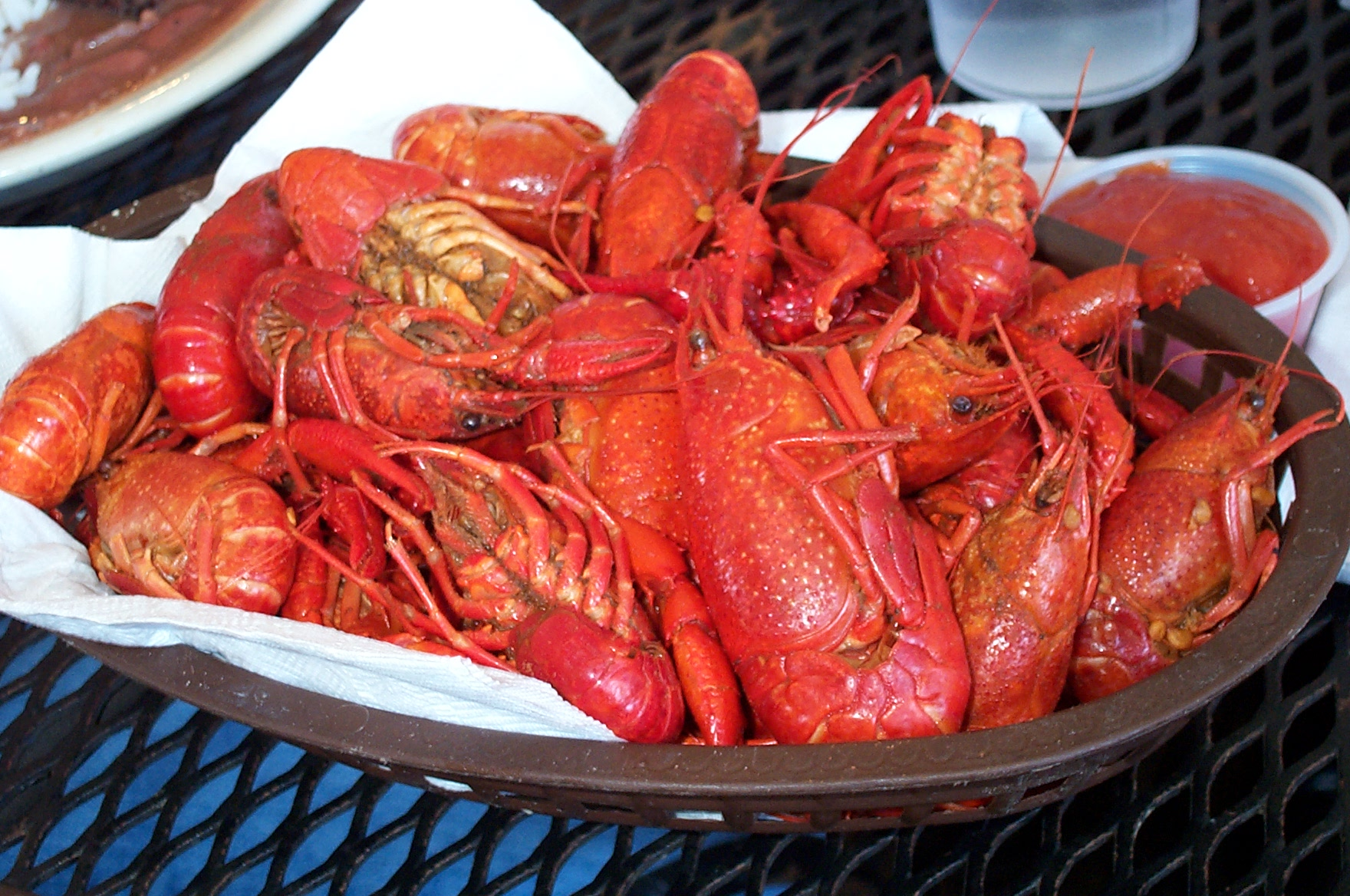
Boiled crawfish, Louisiana

P. clarkii is eaten in China, Cambodia, Thailand, Europe, Africa, the United States, Canada, Australia, New Zealand and the Caribbean. In the United States, crayfish are particularly popular in Louisiana, where the standard culinary terms vary between "crawfish", "crayfish", "crawdaddy" or "mudbug", and crawfish boils are popular social gatherings centered around eating the crustaceans. Louisiana crawfish are usually boiled in a large pot with heavy seasoning (salt, cayenne pepper, lemon, garlic, bay leaf, etc.) and other items such as potatoes and corn on the cob. Many differing methods are used to season the dish, and there are an equal number of opinions on which one is correct.

In 1990, Louisiana produced 90% of the crayfish in the world, and consumed 70% locally. However, as early as 2003, Asian fish farms and fisheries produced more and continued to outpace production in any other part of the world. By 2018, P. clarkii crayfish production in the Americas represented just 4% of total global P. clarkii supply. Louisiana crayfish remain in demand for local production and consumption. In 2018, 93% of crayfish farms in the US were located in Louisiana.

== Reproduction ==
P. clarkii typically mate from spring to fall or year-round in tropical environments. Males and females use pheromones differentiate each other and to choose mates. In addition to smell, females use sight in mate selection and have a preference for larger males. Females may copulate with several males throughout the mating season, and males will sometimes mate with a female multiple times in one season to avoid competition. Females spawn eggs 2.1-2.4mm in diameter on average, with larger crayfish usually having more eggs. These are laid in modified pleopods on the crayfish's tail, where they will incubate and hatch. Upon hatching, juvenile P. clarkii will continue living exclusively in the pleopods until their third instar, at which point they will begin to leave. Although P. clarkii normally reproduces sexually, research suggests it may also reproduce by parthenogenesis.
