= Polyculture =

Growing multiple crops together in agriculture

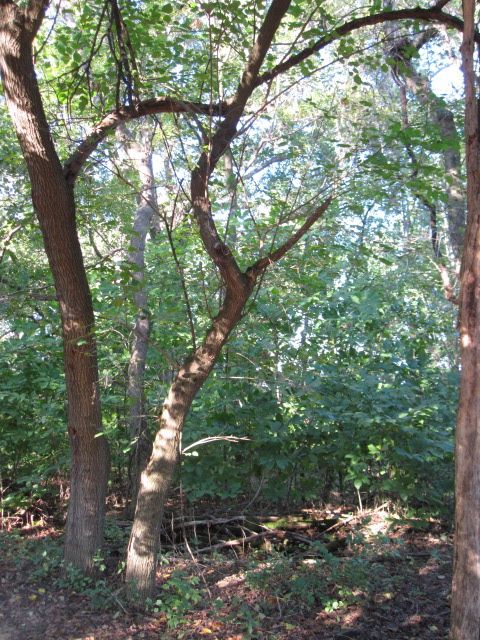
Pawpaw trees growing under mulberry trees, a forest gardening style of polyculture

In agriculture, polyculture is the practice of growing more than one crop species together in the same place at the same time, in contrast to monoculture, which had become the dominant approach in developed countries by 1950. Traditional examples include the intercropping of the Three Sisters, namely maize, beans, and squashes, by indigenous peoples of Central and North America, the rice-fish systems of Asia, and the complex mixed cropping systems of Nigeria.

Polyculture offers multiple advantages, including increasing total yield, as multiple crops can be harvested from the same land, along with reduced risk of crop failure. Resources are used more efficiently, requiring less inputs of fertilizers and pesticides, as interplanted crops suppress weeds, and legumes can fix nitrogen. The increased diversity tends to reduce losses from pests and diseases. Polyculture can yield multiple harvests per year, and can improve the physical, chemical and structural properties of soil, for example as taproots create pores for water and air. Improved soil cover reduces soil drying and erosion. Further, increased diversity of crops can provide people with a healthier diet.

Disadvantages include the skill required to manage polycultures; it can be difficult to mechanize when crops have differing needs for sowing depths, spacings, and times, may need different fertilizers and pesticides, and may be hard to harvest and to separate the crops. Finding suitable plant combinations may be challenging. Competition between species may reduce yields.

Annual polycultures include intercropping, where two or more crops are grown alongside each other; in horticulture, this is called companion planting. A variant is strip cropping where multiple rows of a crop form a strip, beside a strip of another crop. A cover crop involves planting a species that is not a crop, such as grasses and legumes, alongside the crop. The cover plants help reduce soil erosion, suppress weeds, retain water, and fix nitrogen. A living mulch, mainly used in horticulture, involves a second crop used to suppress weeds; a popular choice is marigold, as this has cash value and produces chemicals that repel pests. In mixed cropping, all the seeds are sown together, mimicking natural plant diversity; harvesting is simple, with all the crops being put to the same use.

Perennial polycultures can involve perennial varieties of annual crops, as with rice, sorghum, and pigeon pea; they can be grown alongside legumes such as alfalfa. Rice polycultures often involve animal crops such as fish and ducks. In agroforestry, some of the crops are trees; for example, coffee, which is shade-loving, is traditionally grown under shade trees. The rice-fish systems of Asia produce freshwater fish as well as rice, yielding a valuable extra crop; in Indonesia, a combination of rice, fish, ducks, and water fern produces a resilient and productive permaculture system.

== Definitions ==
Polyculture is the growing of multiple crops together in the same place at the same time. It has traditionally been the most prevalent form of agriculture. Regions where polycultures form a substantial part of agriculture include the Himalayas, Eastern Asia, South America, and Africa. Other names for the practice include mixed cropping and intercropping. It may be contrasted with monoculture where one crop is grown in a field at a time. Both polycultures and monocultures may be subject to crop rotations or other changes with time (table).

Diversity of crops in space and time; monocultures, polycultures, and rotations
			Diversity in time		
			Low	Higher	
			Low	Cyclic	Dynamic
Diversity in space	Low	Monoculture, one species in a field	Continuous monoculture, monocropping	Rotation of monocultures	Sequence of monocultures
Diversity in space	Higher	Polyculture, two or more species intermingled in a field	Continuous polyculture	Rotation of polycultures	Sequence of polycultures

== Historical and modern uses ==
=== Americas: the Three Sisters ===
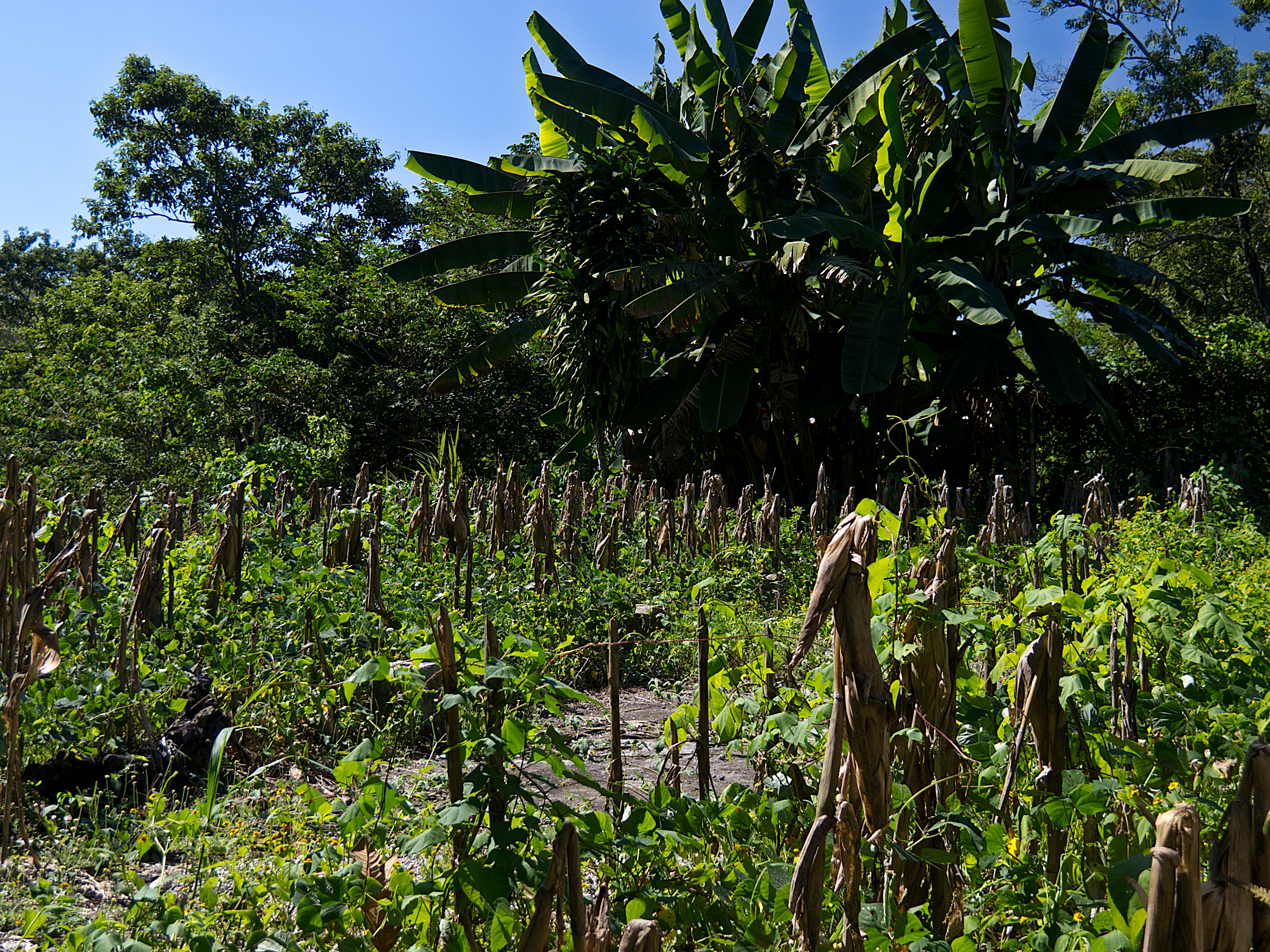
A Central American polycultural "milpa" in 2011. Beans are growing among the drying maize; banana trees are in the background.

A well-known traditional example is the intercropping of maize, beans, and squash plants in the group called "the Three Sisters". In this combination, the maize provides a structure for the bean to grow on, the bean provides nitrogen for all of the plants, while the squash suppresses weeds on the ground. This crop mixture can be traced back some 3,000 years to civilizations in Mesoamerica. It illustrates how species in polycultures can sustain each other and minimize the need for human intervention. The majority of Latin American farmers continue to intercrop their maize, beans, and squash.

=== Asia: terrestrial and aquatic ===
In China, cereals have been intercropped with other plants for 1,000 years; the practice continues in the 21st century on some 28 to 34 million hectares. Polycultures involving fish and plants, have similarly been common in Eastern Asia for many centuries. In China, Japan, and Indonesia, traditional rice polycultures include rice-fish, rice-duck, and rice-fish-duck; modern aquaculture systems in the same region include shrimp and other shellfish grown in rice paddies.

=== Africa: cowpeas and complex mixed cropping ===
In Africa, polyculture has been practised for many centuries. This often involves legumes, especially the cowpea, alongside other crop plants. In Nigeria, complex mixed cropping can involve as many as 13 crops, with rice grown in between mounds holding cassava, cowpea, maize, peanut, pumpkin, Lagenaria, pigeon pea, melon, and a selection of yam species.

=== Impact of development ===
The introduction of pesticides, herbicides, and fertilizers made monoculture the predominant form of agriculture in developed countries from the 1950s. The prevalence of polycultures declined greatly in popularity at that time in more economically developed countries where it was deemed to yield less while requiring more labor. Polyculture farming has not disappeared entirely, and traditional polyculture systems continue to be an essential part of the food production system, especially in developing countries. Around 15% to 20% of the world's agriculture is estimated to rely on traditional polyculture systems. Due to climate change, polycultures are regaining popularity in more-developed countries as food producers seek to reduce their environmental and health impacts.

== Advantages ==
Polycultures can benefit from multiple agroecological effects. Its principal advantages, according to Adamczewska-Sowińska and Sowiński 2020, are:

- Diverse crops provide increased total yield, increased stability, and reduced risk of crop failure.
- More efficient resource usage, including of soil minerals, nitrogen fixing, land, and labour.
- Reduced inputs of fertilizers and pesticides.
- Intercrops suppress weeds.
- Reduced losses from pests, diseases, and weeds.
- Multiple harvests per year are possible.
- Physical, chemical, and structural properties of soil are improved, e.g. with combination of taproot and fibrous-rooted crops.
- Improved soil cover reduces soil drying and erosion.
- Better nutrition for people with varied crops.

=== Efficiency ===
A polyculture makes more efficient use of resources and produces more biomass overall than a monoculture. This is because of synergies between crops, and the creation of ecological niches for other organisms. However, the yield of each crop inside the polyculture is lower, not least because only part of the land area of the field is available to it.

Interactions between crops are complex, but mainly competitive, as each species struggles to obtain room to grow, sunlight, water, and soil nutrients. Many plants exude substances from their roots and other parts that inhibit other plants (allelopathy); some however are beneficial to other plants. Other interactions are beneficial, providing complementarity (as with the provision of nitrogen by legumes to other plants) or facilitation. Interactions vary widely by pairs of species; many recommendations have been made for suitable and unsuitable companion plants. For example, maize is well accompanied by amaranth, legumes, squashes, and sunflower, but not by cabbage, celery, or tomato. Cabbage, on the other hand, is well accompanied by beans, carrot, celery, marigold, and tomato, but not by onion or potato.

=== Improving the soil ===
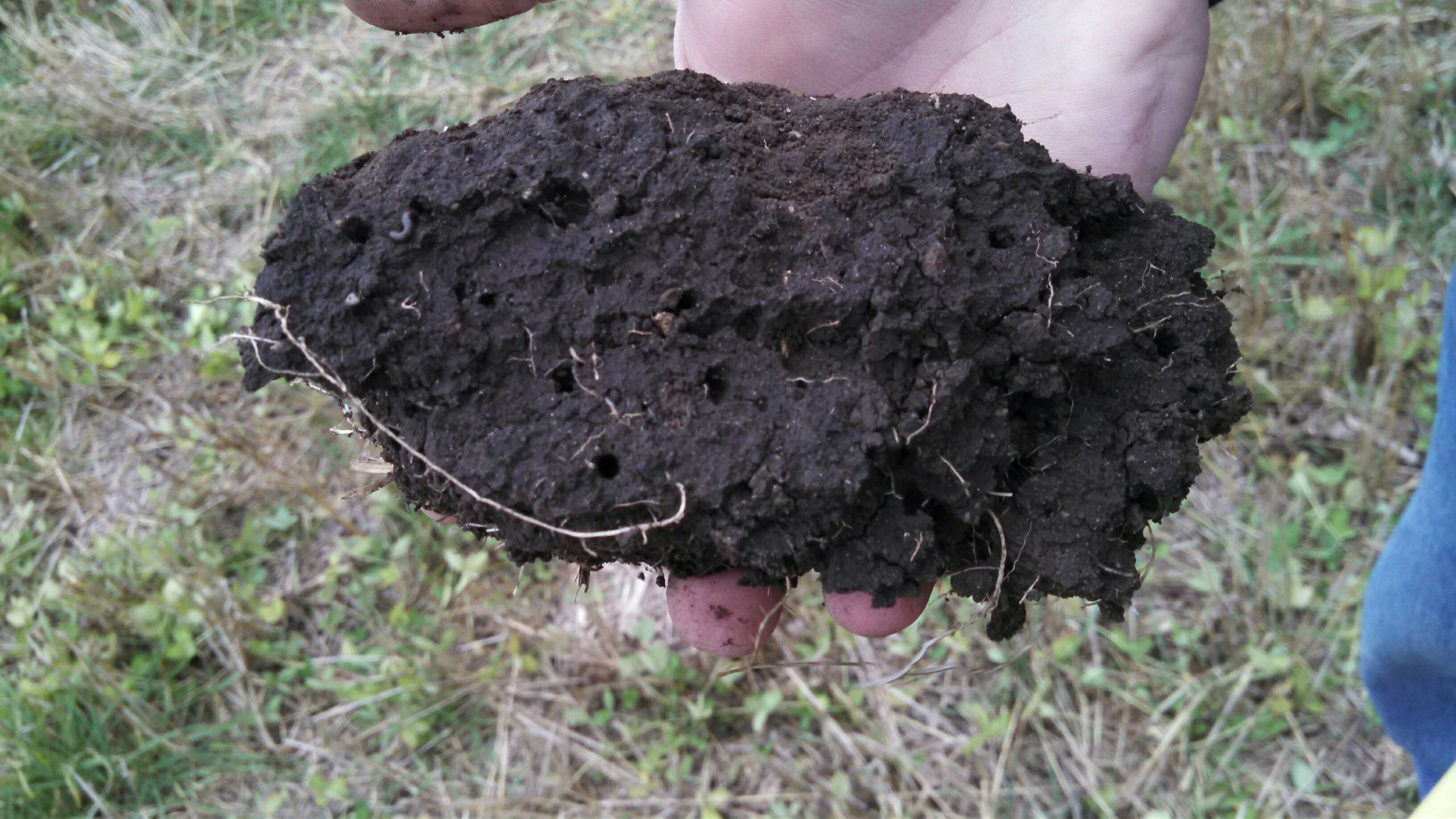
Excellent soil structure in land in South Dakota farmed without tillage using a crop rotation of maize, soybeans, and wheat accompanied by cover crops. The main crop has been harvested but roots of the cover crop are still visible in autumn.

Polycultures can benefit the soil by improving its fertility, its structure, and its biological activity. Soil fertility depends both on inorganic nutrients and on organic matter or humus. Deep-rooted companion crops such as legumes can improve soil structure: when they decay, they leave pores in the soil, improving drainage and allowing air into the soil. Some such as white lupin help cereals like wheat to take up phosphorus, a nutrient that often limits crop growth. Polyculture benefits soil microorganisms; in some forms, such as living mulches, it may also encourage earthworms (which in turn benefit soil structure), most likely by increasing the amount of organic matter in the soil.

=== Sustainability ===
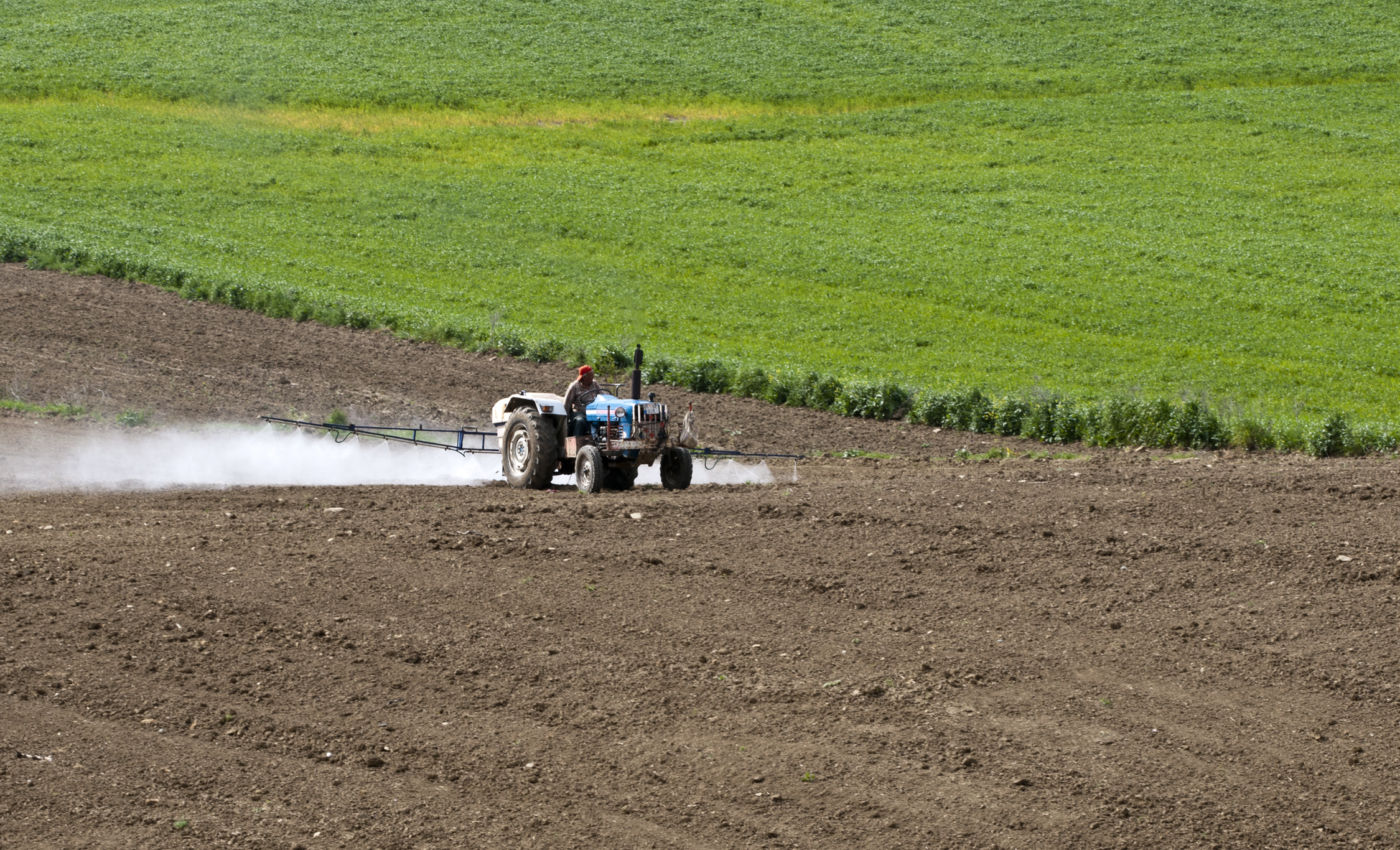
Applying pesticides to crops in a monoculture: polycultures need lower inputs, reducing environmental harms.

Polyculture can reduce the release of pesticides and artificial fertilizers into the environment. Environmental impacts such as eutrophication of fresh water are greatly reduced.

Tillage, which removes essential microbes and nutrients from the soil, can be avoided in some forms of polyculture, especially permaculture. Land is used more productively.

Polyculture increases local biodiversity. Increasing crop diversity can increase pollination in nearby environments, as diverse plants attract a broader array of pollinators. This is an example of reconciliation ecology, accommodating biodiversity within human landscapes, and may form part of a biological pest control program.

=== Weed management ===
Both the density and the diversity of crops affect weed growth in polycultures. Having a greater density of plants reduces the available water, sunlight, and nutrient concentrations in the environment. Such a reduction is heightened with greater crop diversity as more potential resources are fully utilized. This level of competition makes polycultures particularly inhospitable to weeds. When they do grow, weeds can help polycultures, assisting in pest management by attracting natural enemies of pests. Further, they can act as hosts to arthropods that are beneficial to other plants in the polyculture.

=== Pest management ===
Benefits of polyculture include fixation and provision of nitrogen by legumes and pest management.

Pests are less predominant in polycultures than monocultures due to crop diversity. The reduced concentration of a target species in a polyculture attracts fewer pests specific to that crop. These specialized pests often have more difficulty locating host plants in a polyculture. Pests with more generalized preferences spend less time on a polyculture crop, resulting in lower yield loss (associational resistance). Because polycultures mimic naturally diverse ecosystems, general pests are less likely to distinguish between polycultures and the surrounding environment, and may have a smaller presence in the polyculture. Natural enemies or predators of pests are often attracted to the diversity of plants in a polyculture, helping to suppress pest populations.

=== Disease control ===
Plant diseases are less predominant in polycultures than monocultures. The disease-diversity hypothesis states that a greater diversity of plants leads to a decreased severity of disease. Because different plants are susceptible to different diseases, if a disease negatively impacts one crop, it will not necessarily spread to another and so the overall impact on yield is contained. However, diseases and pests do not necessarily have a decreased effect on a specific crop. If targeted by a specialized pest or disease, a crop in a polyculture will likely experience the same yield loss as its monoculture counterpart.

=== Human health ===
Many of the crops consumed today are calorie-rich crops that can lead to illnesses such as obesity, hypertension, and type II diabetes. Because it encourages plant diversity, polycultures can help increase diet diversity and improve people's nutrition by incorporating non-traditional foods into people's diets.

== Disadvantages ==
=== Management ===
Polyculture's principal disadvantages, according to Adamczewska-Sowińska and Sowiński (2020), are:

- Difficult to mechanize sowing and spraying of mixtures of crops which need different sowing depths, rates, and times, and different row spacings, as well as different fertilizers and pesticides, again at their own rates, times, and choice of substances. More manual labour may therefore be required.
- Difficult to harvest and separate crops.
- May not work well for cash crops and staple crops.
- May make herbicide use difficult, again suiting one crop but not another.
- Requires more management and farmer education.

=== Finding suitable combinations ===
The effects of competition can damage plants in certain polycultures. The diverse species chosen to grow together must have complementary needs. Due to the large number of cultivated plant species, finding and testing suitable combinations of plants is difficult; the alternative is to use an existing proven combination.

== Practices ==
The kinds of plants that are grown, their spatial distribution, and the time that they spend growing together determine the specific type of polyculture that is implemented. There is no limit to the types of plants or animals that can be grown together to form a polyculture. The time overlap between plants can be asymmetrical as well, with one plant depending on the other for longer than is reciprocated, often due to differences in life spans.

=== Annual ===
==== Intercropping ====
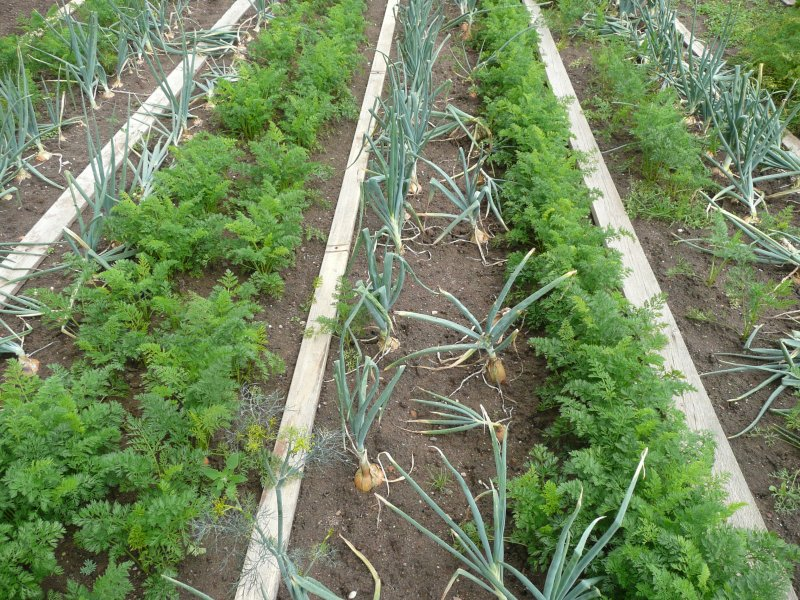
Companion planting of carrots and onions. The onion smell puts off carrot root fly, while the smell of carrots puts off onion fly.

When two or more crops are grown in complete spatial and temporal overlap with each other, the approach is described in agriculture as intercropping, and in horticulture as companion planting. Intercropping is particularly useful in plots with limited land availability. Intercropping can be mixed, in rows, in multi-row strips, or in a relay with crops interplanted at different times.

Strip cropping involves growing different plants in alternating strips, often in rotation. These may be ploughed along the contours of a steep hillside, and are typically considerably wider than a single row of a cereal crop. While strip cropping does not involve the complete intermixing of plant species, it provides many of the same benefits such as reducing soil erosion and aiding with nutrient cycling.

Legumes are among of the most commonly intercropped crops, specifically legume-cereal mixtures. Legumes fix atmospheric nitrogen into the soil so that it is available for consumption by other plants in a process known as nitrogen fixation. The presence of legumes consequently eliminates the need for man-made nitrogen fertilizers in intercrops.

==== Cover cropping ====
When a crop is grown alongside another plant that is not a crop, the combination is a form of cover cropping. If the non-crop plant is a weed, the combination is called a weedy culture. Grasses and legumes are the most common cover crops. Cover crops are greatly beneficial as they can help prevent soil erosion, physically suppress weeds, improve surface water retention, and, in the case of legumes, provide nitrogen compounds as well. Single-species cover cropping, in rotation with cash crops, increases agroecosystem diversity; a cover crop polyculture further increases that diversity, and there is evidence, using a range of cover crop treatments with or without legumes, that this increases ecosystem functionality, in terms of weed suppression, nitrogen retention, and above-ground biomass.

==== Living mulches ====
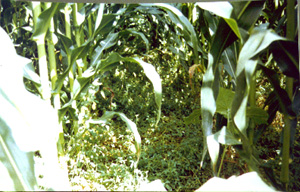
A living mulch planted to reduce weed growth between rows of maize plants.

A living mulch is a polyculture involving a second crop, used mainly in horticulture. A main crop is grown to harvest; a second crop is sown beneath it to cover the soil, reducing erosion, and to form a green manure. Living mulches have been popular under orchard trees, and beneath perennial vegetables such as asparagus and rhubarb. It is considered suitable also for annual crops which grow for a long period before harvest and where the harvest is late in the year, such as aubergine, cabbage, celery, leek, maize, peppers, and tomato. Marigolds have a special place among weed-suppressing living mulches as they produce thiophenes which repel pests such as nematodes, and provide a second cash crop.

Care is required to minimise competition between the living mulch crop and the main crop. Indirect methods include selecting sowing dates or applying water and fertilizer directly to the main crop, or by choosing fast-growing varieties for the main crop. Direct methods include mowing the living mulch to inhibit its root growth, or applying a sublethal amount of herbicide to the living mulch.

For arable use, cereals such as wheat and barley, or broadleaved crops like rapeseed, can grow with living mulches of clover, vetch, or other legumes. However, since the yield of the main crop is reduced, this approach is not widely adopted by cereal farmers. In particular, living mulches like clover compete with young seedlings of the main crop, and need to be suppressed appropriately.

==== Mixed cropping ====
Mixed cropping differs from intercropping in having all the seeds mixed and sown together. The result mimics natural plant diversity. Handling is simple, but there can be competition between the crops, and any pesticide or fertilizer applied goes on all the crops. Harvesting too is a single operation, all the crops then being put to the same use.

=== Perennial ===
==== Agroforestry ====
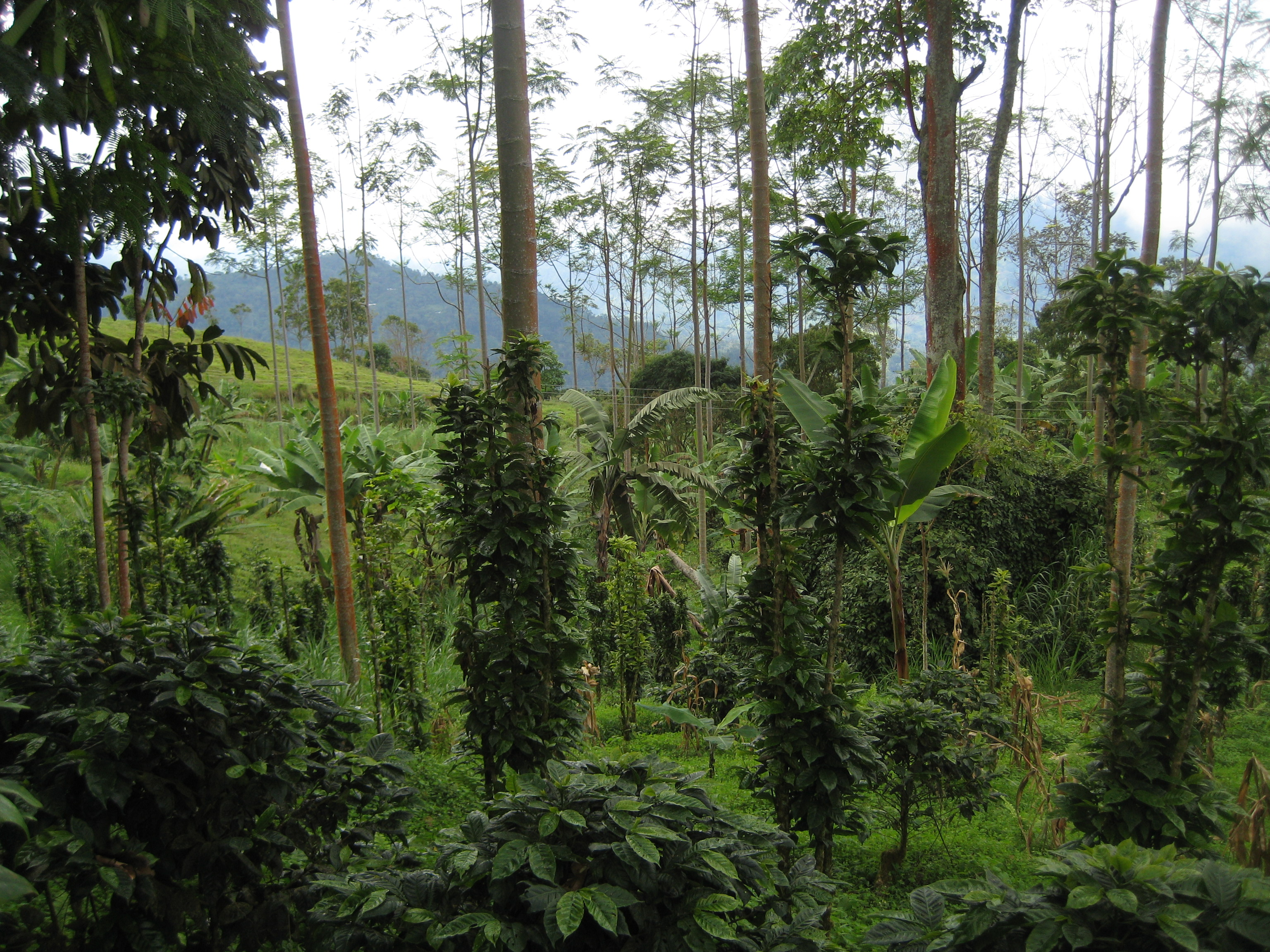
A coffee farm in Colombia where coffee plants are grown under several tree species in imitation of natural ecosystems. Trees provide resources for the coffee plants such as shade, nutrients, and a well-maintained soil.

In many Latin American countries, a popular form of polyculture is agroforestry, where trees and crops are grown together. Trees provide shade for the crops alongside organic matter and nutrients when they shed their leaves or fruits. The elaborate root systems of trees also help prevent soil erosion and increase the presence of microbes in the soil. In addition to benefiting crops, trees act as commodities harvested for paper, medicine, timber, and firewood.

Coffee is a shade-loving crop, and is traditionally shade-grown. In India, it is often grown under a natural forest canopy, replacing the shrub layer. A different polyculture system is used for coffee in Mexico, where the Coffea bushes are grown under leguminous trees in the genus Inga.

==== Varieties of annual arable crops ====
Perennial crop varieties of traditional annual arable crops can increase sustainability. They require less tillage and often have longer roots, reducing soil erosion and tolerating drought. Such varieties are being developed for rice, wheat, sorghum, pigeon pea, barley, and sunflowers. These can be combined with a leguminous cover crop such as alfalfa to fix nitrogen, reducing fertilizer inputs.

==== Rice, fish, and duck systems ====
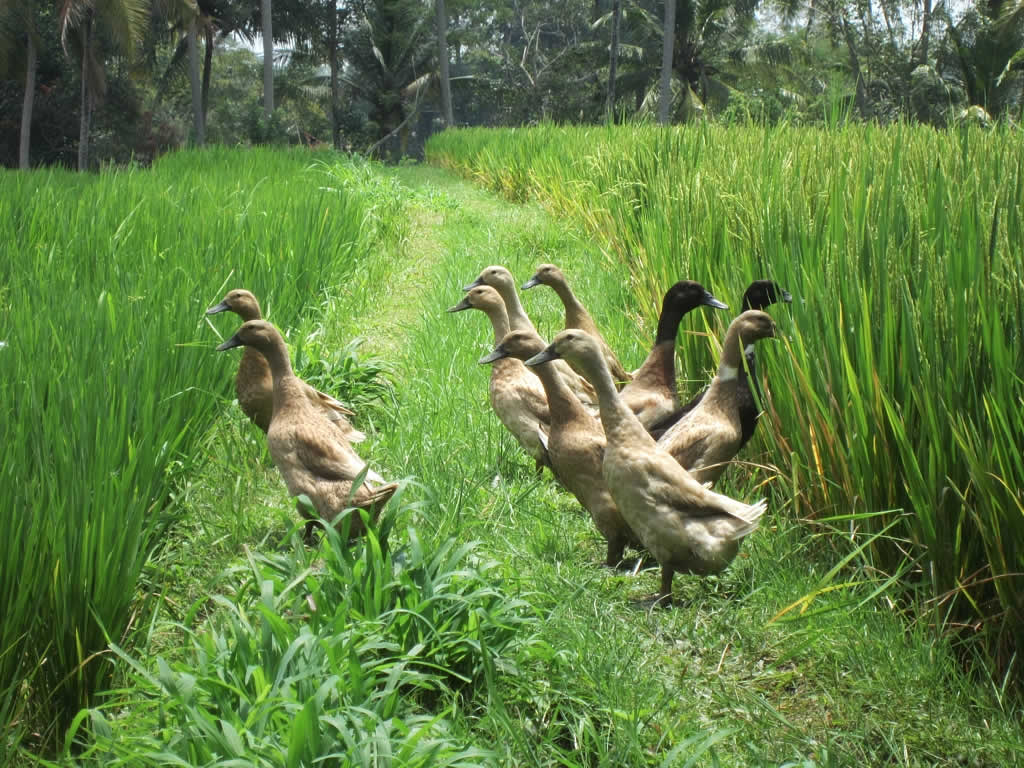
Ducks with free access to rice paddies in Bali, Indonesia provide additional income and manure the fields, reducing the need for fertilizer.

In South-East Asia and China, rice-fish systems on rice paddies have raised freshwater fish as well as rice, producing a valuable additional crop and reducing eutrophication of neighbouring rivers.

Rice-duck farming is practised across tropical and subtropical Asia. A variant in Indonesia combines rice, fish, ducks and water fern for a resilient and productive permaculture system; the ducks eat the weeds that would otherwise limit rice growth, reducing labour and herbicides; the water fern fixes nitrogen; and the duck manure and fish manure reduce the need for fertilizer.

==== Integrated aquaculture ====
Integrated aquaculture is a form of aquaculture in which cultures of fish or shrimp are grown together with seaweed, shellfish, or micro-algae. Mono-species aquaculture poses problems for farmers and the environment. The harvesting of seaweed crops in mono-species aquaculture releases nitrates into the water and can lead to eutrophication. In seafood mono-species aquaculture, the greatest problem is the high cost of feed, more than half of which goes to waste, causing nitrogen release and eutrophication or algal blooms. Technological fixes such as bacterial bio-filters have proven costly. Integrated aquaculture uses plants both as food for the sea animals and for water filtration, absorbing nitrates and carbon dioxide. This reduces the need for chemical inputs. Plants such as seaweed grown alongside seafood have commercial value. Regenerative ocean farming sequesters carbon, growing a mix of seaweeds and shellfish for harvest, while helping to regenerate and restore local habitats like reef ecosystems.

== See also ==
- Agroforestry
- Aquaponics
- Beneficial weeds
- Holistic management
- Nurse crop
