= Sheath blight of rice =

Fungal disease of rice

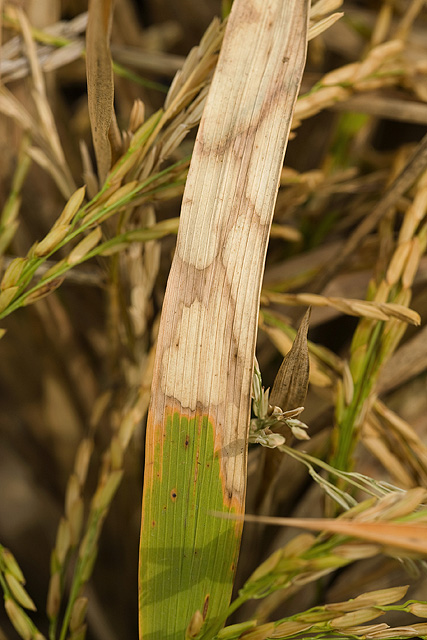
A rice leaf exhibiting typical watermark lesions associated with sheath blight disease

Rice-sheath blight is a disease caused by Rhizoctonia solani (teleomorph is Thanetophorus cucumeris), a basidiomycete, that causes major limitations on rice production in India and other countries of Asia. It is also a problem in the southern US, where rice is also produced. It can decrease yield up to 50%, and reduce its quality. It causes lesions on the rice plant, and can also cause pre- and post-emergence seedling blight, banded leaf blight, panicle infection and spotted seed.

== Disease cycle ==
Infected plants develop circular or oblong lesions, usually green-gray and water-soaked, on their lower leaves, normally in the late tillering or early internode elongation stage of growth. Under favorable conditions of high humidity and low sunlight, the lesions spread and reach the upper part of the plant using runner hyphae. When there is leaf dieback and sun can penetrate and dry the lesions, they turn tan with a brown border. The sclerotia are produced near the infection in about 6 days before falling off. They then survive in the soil, and can be spread as the field is prepared or when it’s flooded for irrigation, enabling them to infect other plants. Both the sclerotia and mycelia of Rhizoctonia solani overwinter in plant debris and in tropical environments where they can survive in weed hosts.

== Management ==
=== Biological control ===
The use of plant growth promoting rhizobacteria (PGPRs) has been proposed as a form of biological control. They have been used to promote plant growth and control other soil-residing bacteria, and have been seen to control bacterial pathogens by competing for space and nutrients and activating plant defense mechanisms. Studies show that some strains of bacteria, when applied to the rice seed before planting, decrease the viability of the sclerotia of R. solani, reducing instances of disease and increasing yield. Some species of antagonists that could become biocontrol agents are a few strains of Pseudomonas fluorescens that inhibit the mycelial growth and sclerotia germination.

=== Chemical control ===
The main control method of sheath blight is the use of systemic and nonsystemic fungicides, of systemic are considered more effective. This method produces fewer instances of disease, less inoculum and better yields. One commonly used chemical controls is azoxystrobin, a QOI that prevents the respiration of fungi.

As resistant plant cultivars have not been found, and cultural controls are impractical, chemical control is currently considered the best option for controlling the disease.

== Pathogenesis ==
Once the rice sheath has been inoculated, the pathogen forms an appressorium and infection cushions. Both intercellular and intracellular hyphae are formed in the epidermal and mesophyll cells. The pathogen then releases many cell wall degrading enzymes (CWDEs) that contribute to lesion formation and spread, including polygalacturonase, cellulase, pectin methylgalacturonase, and polygalacturonic acid trans-eliminase. The ShB pathogen also produces toxins that inhibit rice radicle growth and cause wilting of leaves. The main contributors to pathogenesis by the ShB pathogen are the secreted hormones Cytochrome P450s, a family of enzymes involved in the biosynthesis of plant hormones) and growth hormones.
