= History of organic farming =

Traditional farming (of many particular kinds in different eras and places) was the original type of agriculture, and has been practiced for thousands of years. All traditional farming is now considered to be "organic farming" although at the time there were no known inorganic methods. For example, forest gardening, a fully organic food production system which dates from prehistoric times, is thought to be the world's oldest and most resilient agroecosystem. The industrial revolution introduced inorganic methods, most of which were not well developed and had serious side effects. An organic movement began in the 1940s as a reaction to agriculture's growing reliance on synthetic fertilizers and pesticides. The history of this modern revival of organic farming dates back to the first half of the 20th century at a time when there was a growing reliance on these new synthetic, non-organic methods.

== Pre-World War II ==
The first 40 years of the 20th century saw simultaneous advances in biochemistry and engineering that rapidly and profoundly changed farming. The introduction of the gasoline-powered internal combustion engine ushered in the era of the tractor and made possible hundreds of mechanized farm implements. Research in plant breeding led to the commercialization of hybrid seed. And a new manufacturing process made nitrogen fertilizer — first synthesized in the mid-19th century — affordably abundant. These factors changed the labour equation: there were almost no tractors in the US around 1910, but over 3,000,000 by 1950; in 1900, it took one farmer to feed 2.5 people, but currently the ratio is 1 to well over 100. Fields grew bigger and cropping more specialized to make more efficient use of machinery. The reduced need for manual labour and animal labour that machinery, herbicides, and fertilizers made possible created an era in which the mechanization of agriculture evolved rapidly.

Consciously organic agriculture, as distinct from traditional agricultural methods that predated inorganic inputs, began more or less simultaneously in Central Europe and India. The British botanist Sir Albert Howard is often referred to as the father of modern organic agriculture, because he was the first to apply modern scientific knowledge and methods to traditional agriculture. From 1905 to 1924, he and his wife Gabrielle, herself a plant physiologist, worked as agricultural advisers in Pusa, Bengal, where they documented traditional Indian farming practices and came to regard them as superior to conventional agricultural practices. Their research and further development of these methods is recorded in his writings, notably, his 1940 book, An Agricultural Testament, which influenced many scientists and farmers of the day.

In Germany, Rudolf Steiner's development, biodynamic agriculture, was probably the first comprehensive system of what we now call organic farming. This began with a lecture series Steiner presented at a farm in Koberwitz (Kobierzyce now in Poland) in 1924. Steiner emphasized the farmer's role in guiding and balancing the interaction of the animals, plants and soil. Healthy animals depended upon healthy plants (for their food), healthy plants upon healthy soil, healthy soil upon healthy animals (for the manure). His system was based on his philosophy of anthroposophy rather than a good understanding of science. To develop his system of farming, Steiner established an international research group called the Agricultural Experimental Circle of Anthroposophical Farmers and Gardeners of the General Anthroposophical Society.

In 1909, American agronomist F.H. King toured China, Korea, and Japan, studying traditional fertilization, tillage, and general farming practices. He published his findings in Farmers of Forty Centuries (1911, Courier Dover Publications, ISBN 0-486-43609-8). King foresaw a "world movement for the introduction of new and improved methods" of agriculture and in later years his book became an important organic reference.

The term "organic farming" was coined by Walter James (Lord Northbourne), a student of Biodynamic Agriculture, in his book Look to the Land (written in 1939, published 1940). In this text, James described a holistic, ecologically balanced approach to farming, "the farm as organism," basing this on Steiner's agricultural principles and methods. One year previously to his book's publication, James had hosted the first Biodynamic Agriculture conference in England, the Betteshanger Summer School and Conference, at which Ehrenfried Pfeiffer was the key presenter.

In 1939 James, Albert Howard, Ehrenfried Pfeiffer and George Stapleton joined at Farleigh to implement an experiment comparing Biodynamic, organic and chemical fertilization methods. The "Farleigh Experiment" had been planned since initial meetings in 1936 and involved ten participants. The experiment was cut short due to the fact that Biodynamic compost was not available until after the Betteshanger Summer School event, the disruption of the impending war, and lack of funding. Though inconclusive, this experiment was seen as providing impetus for the similar "Haughley Experiment" described below.

In 1939, Lady Eve Balfour, who had been farming in Haughley Green, Suffolk, since 1920, launched the Haughley Experiment. Lady Balfour believed that mankind's health and future depended on how the soil was used, and that non-intensive farming could produce more wholesome food. The experiment was run to generate data to test these beliefs. Four years later, she published The Living Soil, based on the initial findings of the Haughley Experiment. Widely read, it led to the formation of a key international organic advocacy group, the Soil Association.

In Japan, Masanobu Fukuoka, a microbiologist working in soil science and plant pathology, began to doubt the modern agricultural movement. In 1937, he quit his job as a research scientist, returned to his family's farm in 1938, and devoted the following decades to developing a no-till organic method for growing grain and other crops, now known as natural farming (自然農法, shizen nōhō), nature farming, 'do–nothing' farming or Fukuoka farming.

== Post-World War II ==
Technological advances during World War II accelerated post-war innovation in all aspects of agriculture, resulting in large advances in mechanization (including large-scale irrigation), fertilization, and pesticides. In particular, two chemicals that had been produced in quantity for warfare, were repurposed for peacetime agricultural uses. Ammonium nitrate, used in munitions, became an abundantly cheap source of nitrogen. And a range of new pesticides appeared: DDT, which had been used to control disease-carrying insects around troops, became a general insecticide, launching the era of widespread pesticide use.

At the same time, increasingly powerful and sophisticated farm machinery allowed a single farmer to work larger areas of land and fields grew bigger.

In 1944, an international campaign called the Green Revolution was launched in Mexico with private funding from the US. It encouraged the development of hybrid plants, chemical controls, large-scale irrigation, and heavy mechanization in agriculture around the world.

During the 1950s, sustainable agriculture was a topic of scientific interest, but research tended to concentrate on developing the new chemical approaches. One of the reasons for this, which informed and guided the ongoing Green Revolution, was the widespread belief that high global population growth, which was demonstrably occurring, would soon create worldwide food shortages unless humankind could rescue itself through ever higher agricultural technology. At the same time, however, the adverse effects of "modern" farming continued to kindle a small but growing organic movement. For example, in the U.S., J. I. Rodale began to popularize the term and methods of organic growing, particularly to consumers through promotion of organic gardening.

In 1962, Rachel Carson, a prominent scientist and naturalist, published Silent Spring, chronicling the effects of DDT and other pesticides on the environment. A bestseller in many countries, including the US, and widely read around the world, Silent Spring is widely considered as being a key factor in the US government's 1972 banning of DDT. The book and its author are often credited with launching the worldwide environmental movement.

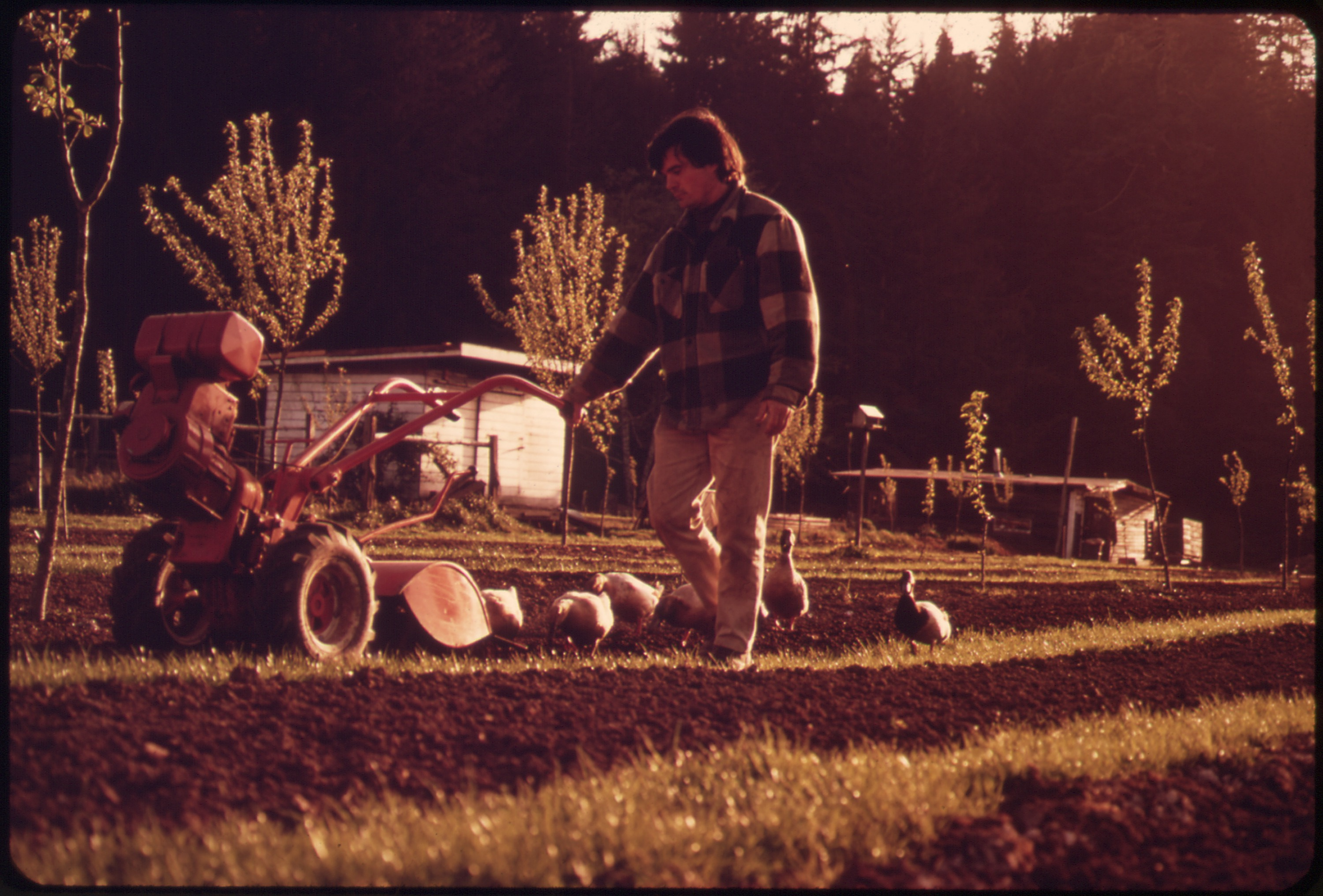
An organic farmer, California, 1972

In the 1970s, global movements concerned with pollution and the environment increased their focus on organic farming. As the distinction between organic and conventional food became clearer, one goal of the organic movement was to encourage consumption of locally grown food, which was promoted through slogans like "Know Your Farmer, Know Your Food".

An early organic farmers' association, the Maine Organic Farmers and Gardeners Association was founded in 1971.

In 1972, the International Federation of Organic Agriculture Movements (IFOAM) was founded in Versailles, France and dedicated to the diffusion and exchange of information on the principles and practices of organic agriculture of all schools and across national and linguistic boundaries.

In 1975, Fukuoka released his book, The One-Straw Revolution, with a strong impact in certain areas of the agricultural world. His approach to small-scale grain production emphasized a meticulous balance of the local farming ecosystem, and a minimum of human interference and labour.

In the U.S. during the 1970s and 1980s, J. I. Rodale and his Rodale Press (now Rodale, Inc.) advocated for organic farming methods. The press's books offered how-to information and advice to Americans interested in trying organic gardening and farming.

In 1984, Oregon Tilth established an early organic certification service in the United States.

In the 1980s, around the world, farming and consumer groups began seriously pressuring for government regulation of organic production. This led to legislation and certification standards being enacted through the 1990s and to date. In the United States, the Organic Foods Production Act of 1990 tasked the USDA with developing national standards for organic products, and the final rule establishing the National Organic Program was first published in the Federal Register in 2000.

In Havana, Cuba, the loss of Soviet economic support following the collapse of the Soviet Union in 1991 led to a focus on local agricultural production and the development of a unique state-supported urban organic agriculture program called organopónicos.

Since the early 1990s, the retail market for organic farming in developed economies has been growing by about 20% annually due to increasing consumer demand. Concern for the quality and safety of food, and the potential for environmental damage from conventional agriculture, are apparently responsible for this trend.

=== Economics ===
In 2001, the global market value of certified organic products was estimated at US$20 billion. By 2014, retail sales of organic products reached US$80 billion worldwide. North America and Europe accounted for more than 90% of all organic product sales in 2014. By 2024, global sales of organic products exceeded €134 billion.

== See also ==
- Biodynamic agriculture
