= Friend Sykes =

English organic farmer

- Born: 1888
- Died: 1965 (aged 76–77)
- Occupation: Organic farmer

Friend Sykes (1888–1965) was an English organic farmer and writer.

== Life ==
Sykes was a breeder of livestock and racehorses. In 1935, he purchased the Chantry estate, near Andover. The land was poor quality and sold for only £4 per acre. Sykes wanted the challenge of transforming the land for fertility without the use of artificials. Sykes was supported by Albert Howard who taught him methods of humus farming. Within a few years his farm land had produced outstanding wheat and prize-winning racehorses.

Sykes was a founding member of the Soil Association. Sykes, Lady Eve Balfour and George Scott Williamson organized a founder's meeting on 12 June 1945, in which about a hundred people attended. The Soil Association was founded a year later. Sykes and Albert Howard have been described as founders of the organic movement. The use of compost and manure to improve soil was important to Sykes' approach to farming. Sykes and Frank Newman Turner's organic farming emphasized ploughless soil cultivation, green manure, organic soil cover and ley farming.

Friend Sykes was sometimes confused with Frank Sykes, a farmer who also wrote books on agriculture for Faber and Faber. (Note: Frank Sykes authored This Farming Business (1944) and Living from the Land (1957).)

== Selected publications ==
- Humus and the Farmer (Faber and Faber, 1946)
- Food, Farming and the Future (Faber and Faber, 1951)
- Modern Humus Farming (Faber and Faber, 1959)
