= Frank Newman Turner =

British organic farmer, writer and broadcaster (1913–1964)

- Born: 11 September 1913; Worsborough, Yorkshire
- Died: 28 June 1964 (aged 50); Bingen, Germany
- Education: Leeds University, University of Glasgow
- Occupations: Farming, writing, publishing, complementary medicine
- Spouse(s): Lorna Mary Turner (nee Clark); m 6 June 1939
- Children: Three sons

Frank Newman Turner, NDA, NDD, FNIMH, (11 September 1913 – 28 June 1964) was a British pioneering organic farmer, writer and broadcaster, who, based on his experience of natural treatment of animals, later became a consulting medical herbalist and naturopath. His books Fertility Farming, Fertility Pastures, and Herdsmanship are regarded as classics of practical organic husbandry.

== Early life ==
Frank Newman Turner was born in Worsborough near Barnsley, the eldest of five children of Frank Bocking Turner and Mary (née Clayton), Yorkshire tenant farmers. He studied at Leeds University, where he earned his colours in boxing and rugby, and graduated with a National Diploma in Agriculture (NDA) and then a National Diploma in Dairying (NDD) from the University of Glasgow.

After managerial positions on farms in Yorkshire, East Anglia, and Wales, he moved to London to work as an advisor for cattle feed suppliers and later joined the Potato Marketing Board. While in London, he began his journalistic career, contributing regularly to Farmers Weekly, The Dairy Farmer, and other agricultural periodicals. He also became active in the Peace Movement after attending lectures by Canon Dick Sheppard who founded the Peace Pledge Union in 1934. Newman Turner later became chairman of the Golders Green branch of the PPU. It was here that he met Hugh J. Schonfield who invited him to become vice president of his newly formed Society for the Creation of a Holy Nation, later renamed Commonwealth of World Citizens. Newman Turner registered as a conscientious objector (CO) in 1940 and became the manager of Goosegreen Farm, near Bridgwater in Somerset, which was run by a group of pacifists and Quakers as a training centre for COs who were required to work on the land.

== Organic farming ==
Inspired by the work of Sir Albert Howard, whose books An Agricultural Testament (1943) and Farming and Gardening for Health and Disease (1945) advocated composting, he restored the health of the rather run-down farm and its ailing livestock by the use of deep rooting herbal leys, fasting, and botanic remedies. (Note: For more information on herbal leys, fasting, and botanic remedies, see e.g.) After the war, he bought Goosegreen Farm and, in 1946, launched a quarterly magazine, The Farmer - a journal of organic farming and natural living 'published and edited from the farm'.

He also established the Institute of Organic Husbandry which held a series of weekend courses on organic farming and gardening and attracted visitors from as far afield as North America, Australia, and India. Visitors to Goosegreen Farm included the author and organic farmer, Robert Henriques, Fyfe Robertson, of Picture Post, Lady Eve Balfour, founder of the Soil Association, Laurence Easterbrook, Juliette de Baïracli Levy, Doris Grant, author of Your Daily Bread, and writers and artists such as Elspeth Huxley, Reginald Reynolds, and Ethel Mannin, as well as Richard de la Mare, the agricultural editor of the publisher Faber & Faber which later published Newman Turner's books. Henriques and Grant were also among the trustees of the Producer Consumer Whole Food Society which was founded and sponsored by The Farmer to put growers and consumers of organic produce in touch with each other. Newman Turner also served on the council of The Soil Association.

== Writing and publishing ==
Before Sir Albert Howard died in 1947, he had urged Newman Turner to write about his experiences in restoring the farm and building a herd of prize-winning pedigree Jersey cattle. However, Newman Turner was keen to accumulate even more practical evidence and it was not until 1951 that Faber & Faber published Fertility Farming. This was followed by Herdsmanship (1953) and Fertility Pastures (1955). In 1950 he had published a booklet under The Farmer imprint, "Cure your own Cattle". After an outbreak of foot and mouth disease in the UK beginning around Jan-Feb 1951, he offered to take infected cattle into his herd to demonstrate that animals fed on organic pasture would have immunity to the disease or recover with natural treatment. The Ministry of Agriculture rejected this challenge. Newman Turner was in demand as a spokesman on natural farming and animal rearing, appearing regularly on regional radio stations and, for a time, on BBC television's The Smokey Club, a pet care programme presented by the zoologist George Cansdale.

He is also known to have been one of many notable figures sketched or painted by the portraitist, Elva Blacker.

== Human health ==
In 1953 Newman Turner and his family sold Goosegreen Farm and moved to the Ferne Estate, near Shaftesbury on the borders of Dorset and Wiltshire, to run the home farm on organic lines. Ferne had been the home of the Dowager Duchess of Hamilton, who had set up an animal sanctuary there. His hope had been to establish an animal hospital using natural methods of treatment but this did not work out, owing to objections to him publishing from the Ferne estate. Having by now qualified as a medical herbalist in the human field and consulted at the Society of Herbalists' Culpeper shops, founded by Hilda Leyel (Mrs C. F. Lyel) in London, Oxford, and Harrogate, he decided to sell his pedigree Jersey herd and focus on publishing and human health. In 1958 the family moved to Letchworth Garden City where he established a practice in osteopathy, naturopathy and medical herbalism. After Frank's demise, his eldest son Roger took over the clinic and ran it until his own retirement in January 2016.

The Farmer had featured a supplement on organic horticulture and, in 1957, Newman Turner launched The Gardener, Small Livestock and Pet Owner as a monthly magazine with eminent horticulturist W. E. Shewell-Cooper, as associate editor, and Lawrence D. Hills a regular contributor. Lawrence Hills, a well known alpinist and horticultural writer, founded the Henry Doubleday Research Association (now Garden Organic) in 1954 and invited Newman Turner to become its first president, a position he held until his death. He had also taken on publication of the magazine of the National Institute of Medical Herbalists which he relaunched as Fitness and Health from Herbs. In 1962 he was made a Fellow of the Institute for his work on behalf of herbal medicine.

In the early 1950s Newman Turner set up a company in Bridgwater, Organic Herbal Products, to supply natural pet foods and herbal remedies and, in 1962, with his wife, Lorna, Inter-Medics Ltd. a company importing herbal medicines and health food products from Germany and Switzerland. Neither of these is still operating. He died of a heart attack while visiting herbal suppliers in Bingen, Germany on 28 June 1964.

== Bibliography ==
- Newman Turner, Frank (2009). Cure your own Cattle. Reprint. [1st pub. 1950. Bridgwater, Somerset: The Farmer Publications.] Austin, Texas: AcresUSA. ISBN 978-1-60173-008-4.
- Fertility Farming (1951). London, Faber & Faber Ltd. Revised edition (2009). Austin, Texas, AcresUSA. ISBN 978-1-60173-009-1
- "Foot and Mouth Disease -Its Prevention and Cure. A challenge" (1952) London, Animal Defence and Anti-Vivisection Society.
- Herdsmanship (1952). London, Faber & Faber Ltd. Revised edition (2009). Austin, Texas, AcresUSA. ISBN 978-1-60173-010-7
- Fertility Pastures (1955). London, Faber & Faber Ltd. Revised edition (2009). Austin, Texas, AcresUSA. ISBN 978-1-60173-011-4
- Herbs, Flavours and Spices, by Elizabeth S Hayes (1963) Ed. Newman Turner. London Faber & Faber Ltd.
- Against the Grain The life of Frank Newman Turner, by Roger Newman Turner (2022) London, Austin Macauley Publishers Ltd. ((ISBN 9781787108035))
