= Henry Doubleday =

Henry Doubleday may refer to:

- Henry Doubleday (entomologist) (1808–1875), English entomologist and ornithologist of Epping, Essex, UK
- Henry Doubleday (horticulturalist) (1810–1902), English scientist and horticulturist of Coggeshall, Essex, UK
