= Organic Food Federation =

- Founded: 1986; 40 years ago
- Purpose: Organic movement
- Location: 31 Turbine Way, Ecotec Business Park, Swaffham PE37 7XD
- Region served: United Kingdom
- Method: Campaign and certification
- Website: www.orgfoodfed.com

The Organic Food Federation is a lobbying organization which certifies organic products in the United Kingdom.

== Overview ==
The organisation was established in 1986. It is headquartered in Swaffham.

It is one of eight such agencies in the UK, alongside the Biodynamic Agriculture Association, the Irish Organic Farmers and Growers Association, Organic Farmers and Growers, the Organic Trust, Quality Welsh Food Certification, the Scottish Organic Producers Association, and the Soil Association.

It has lobbied stakeholders at the Department for Environment, Food and Rural Affairs and the European Commission.
