= Frederick Blackman =

British plant physiologist (1866–1947)

- Born: Frederick Frost Blackman; 25 July 1866; Lambeth, London
- Died: 25 January 1947 (aged 80)
- Resting place: Parish of the Ascension Burial Ground
- Education: University of Cambridge
- Spouse: Elsie
- Awards: Royal Medal
- Scientific career
- Fields: Botany

Frederick Frost Blackman FRS (25 July 1866 – 30 January 1947) was a British plant physiologist.

Frederick Blackman was born in Lambeth, London to a doctor. He studied medicine at St. Bartholomew's Hospital, graduating MA. In the subsequent years, he studied natural sciences at the University of Cambridge and was awarded DSc.

He conducted research on plant physiology, in particular photosynthesis, in Cambridge until his retirement in 1936. Gabrielle Matthaei was his assistant until 1905; her laboratory work underpinned much of the theory of FF Blackman’s Law of Limiting Factors (below). Their collaboration ended in 1905 when Gabrielle married Albert Howard, thereafter supporting his work as Imperial Economic Botanist to the Government of India.

FF Blackman was elected in May 1906 a Fellow of the Royal Society, his candidature citation reading "Fellow of St John's College, Cambridge. Ex-Lecturer and now Reader in Botany in the University." In 1921 he was awarded the Royal Medal and in 1923 delivered the Croonian lecture.

In 1917, at the age of 51, FF Blackman surprised friends and colleagues when he married Elsie Chick (age 35). He became thereby the brother-in-law of his old friend and fellow botanist, Arthur Tansley. In 1903 Tansley had married Elsie’s sister, Edith Chick. FF was Tansley's best man. The two men, and FF’s brother, Vernon Blackman (another botanist), had become friends while students at Cambridge. As young graduates working in London, Tansley and Vernon had been flatmates. The Blackman family completed half a century at the forefront of British botany through the work of Vernon’s son, Geoffrey E. Blackman, an applied botanist who served as Secretary of the Biology War Committee (WWII).

FF Blackman was buried at the Parish of the Ascension Burial Ground in Cambridge, with his wife Elsie (1882–1967).

== Blackman's law of limiting factors ==
Blackman proposed the law of limiting factors in 1905. According to this law, when a process depends on a number of factors, its rate is limited by the pace of the slowest factor. Blackman's law is illustrated by $\ce{C O2}$ concentration as a limiting factor in the rate of oxygen production in photosynthesis:

Suppose a leaf is exposed to a certain light intensity which can use 5 mg. of $\ce{C O2}$ per hour in photosynthesis. If only 1 mg. of $\ce{C O2}$ enters the leaf in an hour, the rate of photosynthesis is limited due to $\ce{C O2}$ factor. But as the concentration of the $\ce{C O2}$ increases from 1 to 5 mg./hour the rate of photosynthesis is also increased.

== Works ==
'Experimental researches in vegetable assimilation and respiration':

- 1895: "On a new method for investigating the carbonic acid exchanges of plants", Annals of Botany 9(1): 161 doi:10.1093/oxfordjournals.aob.a090729
- 1895: "On the paths of gaseous exchange between areal leaves and the atmosphere", Annals of Botany
- 1895: (with Gabrielle Matthaei) "On the effect of temperature on carbon dioxide assimilation"
- 1905: (with Gabrielle Matthaei) A Quantitative Study of Carbon Dioxide Assimilation and Leaf Temperature in Natural Illumination, Philosophical Transactions of the Royal Society at London JSTOR 80215
- 1905: "Optima and Limiting Factors", Annals of Botany, doi:10.1093/oxfordjournals.aob.a089000

== See also ==
- Dorothea Pertz (1859–1939) – British botanist
