= Seed library =

Institution that lends or shares seed

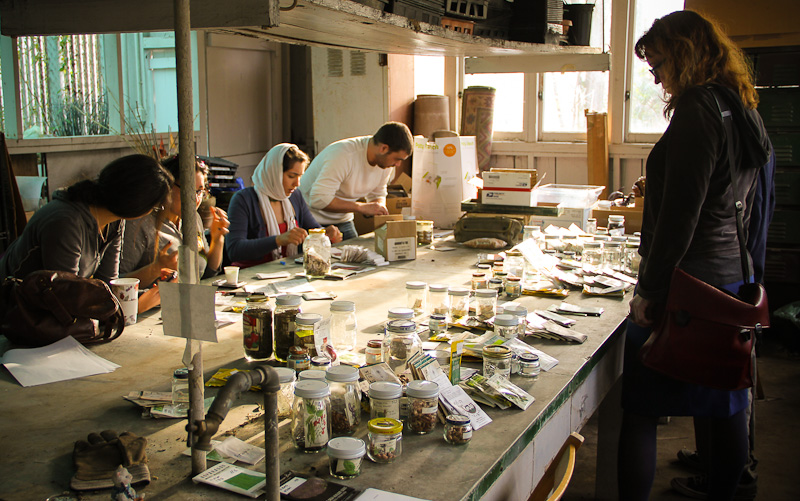
The Seed Library of Los Angeles: checking out seeds at a monthly meeting.

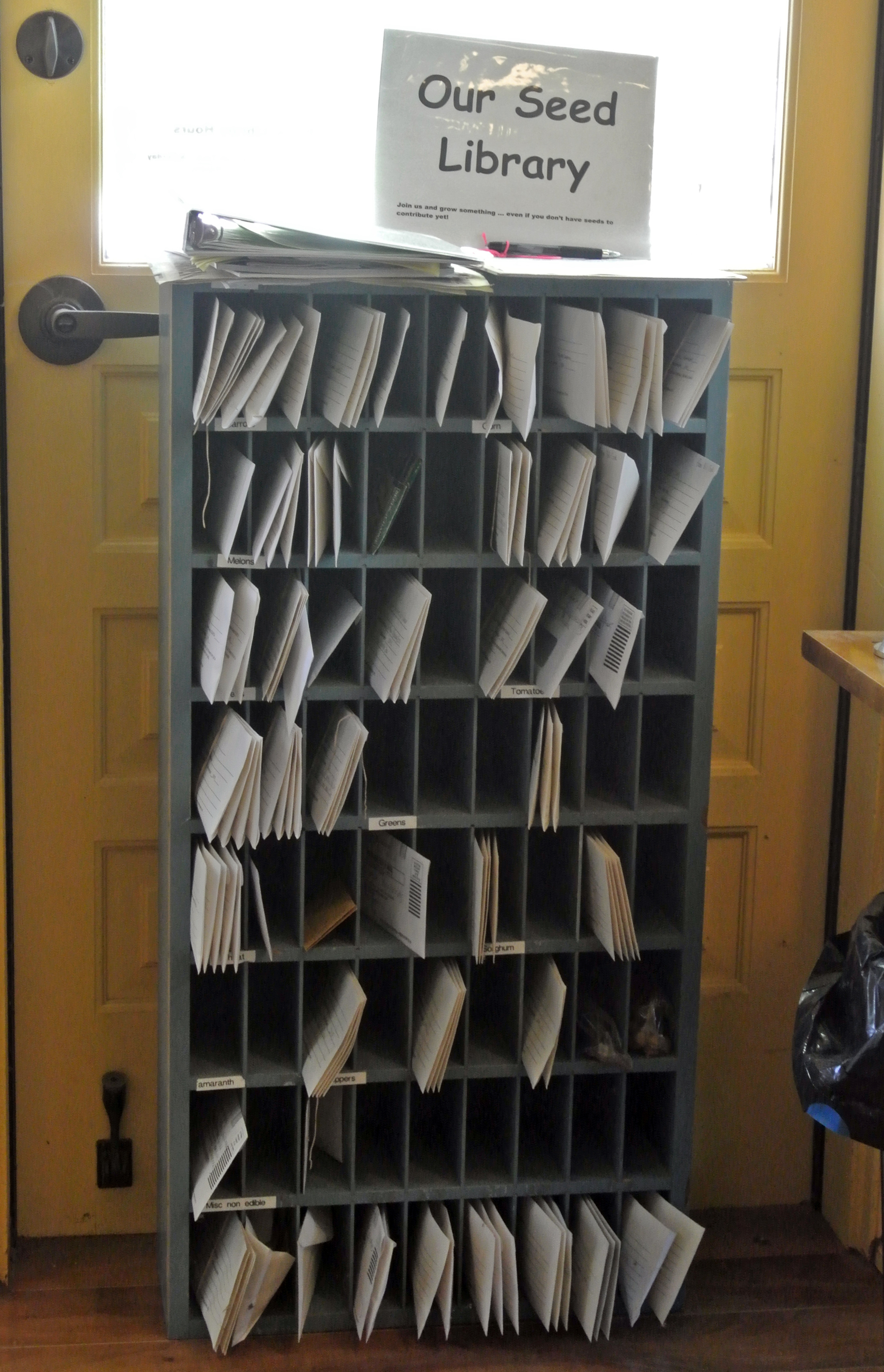
Seed library shelving, USA

A seed library is an institution that lends or shares seed. It is distinguished from a seedbank in that the main purpose is not to store or hold germplasm or seeds against possible destruction, but to disseminate them to the public which preserves the shared plant varieties through propagation and further sharing of seed.

== History ==
The first seed library was created in 1975 in Bocking, Essex in the United Kingdom. Established by Lawrence Hills, It was called the HDRA Vegetable Seed Library, now known as the Heritage Seed Library. Run by Garden Organic, the Heritage Seed Library conserves up to 800 varieties of heritage and heirloom vegetable seeds. The first seed library to be established in a public library in America was at the Gardiner Public Library in Gardiner, New York and was developed by Ken Greene in 2004. Since then, the number of seed libraries has grown to over 450 across the globe, with most being established in the United States.

== Function ==
Seed libraries can maintain their collections through donations from members, but may also operate as pure charity operations intent on serving gardeners and farmers. A common attribute of many seed libraries is to preserve agricultural biodiversity by focusing on rare, local, and heirloom seed varieties. Seed libraries can also receive donations from companies, either monetarily or through actual donations of seeds. For example, Scottsdale Public Library is partnered with Blue Zones Project Scottsdale to provide seeds to patrons.

Seed libraries use varied methods for sharing seeds, primarily by:

- seed swaps otherwise known as seed exchanges, in which library members or the public meet and exchange seeds
- seed "lending," in which people check out seed from the library's collection, grow them, save the seed, and return seed from the propagated plants to the library

Seed libraries may function as programs of public libraries, such as the programs of the Richmond Public Library in California (the "Richmond Grows" program is the "unofficial spiritual center" of the public library seed library movement) and the New Port Richey Public Library (Florida). Seed library initiatives in public libraries garner patron participation as a novelty supplement to book check-outs. Seed packets are usually located next to everyday circulated items like books, audiobooks, CDs, and DVDs. Seed libraries in public libraries have been successful because they catch patron hobby curiosities. Public libraries are an appropriate space for seed libraries because they make seeds and plants available to everyone.

They are also located in college libraries, such as Hampshire College's seed library; museums, such as the Hull-House Heirloom Seed Library, a program of the Jane Addams Hull-House Museum. or as membership based online programs like the Hudson Valley Seed Library. Some have developed as programs of botanical gardens, such as that of the VanDusen Botanical Garden, or from gardening associations and research institutes, such as the Heritage Seed Library of Garden Organic. Other seed libraries have evolved from community sustainability or resilience efforts, such as the Bay Area Seed Interchange Library (BASIL) (the United States' oldest seed library, which developed from the Berkeley, California Ecology Center); and still others from the Slow Food movement, such as Grow Gainesville's seed program.

While "lending" is straightforward, "returning" or re-depositing seeds presents a challenge, since the new seeds are not necessarily well-described, and may be inadvertent hybrids. Some libraries, like the Live Oak Public Library in Savannah, Georgia, do not accept returns or unsolicited donations to ensure quality control. Other libraries, like the Live Oak Public Library in, Live Oak, Florida, ask that borrowers return seeds if possible but there is no penalty for not doing so, and they will not accept hybrid or GMO seeds.

Seed libraries complement the preservationist activities of seedbanks, by collecting local and heirloom varieties that might otherwise be lost, and by collecting new local varieties. In theory, lending and returning seed libraries will also promote local agriculture over time, by growing collections of seeds locally adapted to the region.

== See also ==
- Heirloom plant
- Kokopelli Seed Foundation
- Library
- Navdanya
- Seed saving
