= Louise Howard =

British scholar

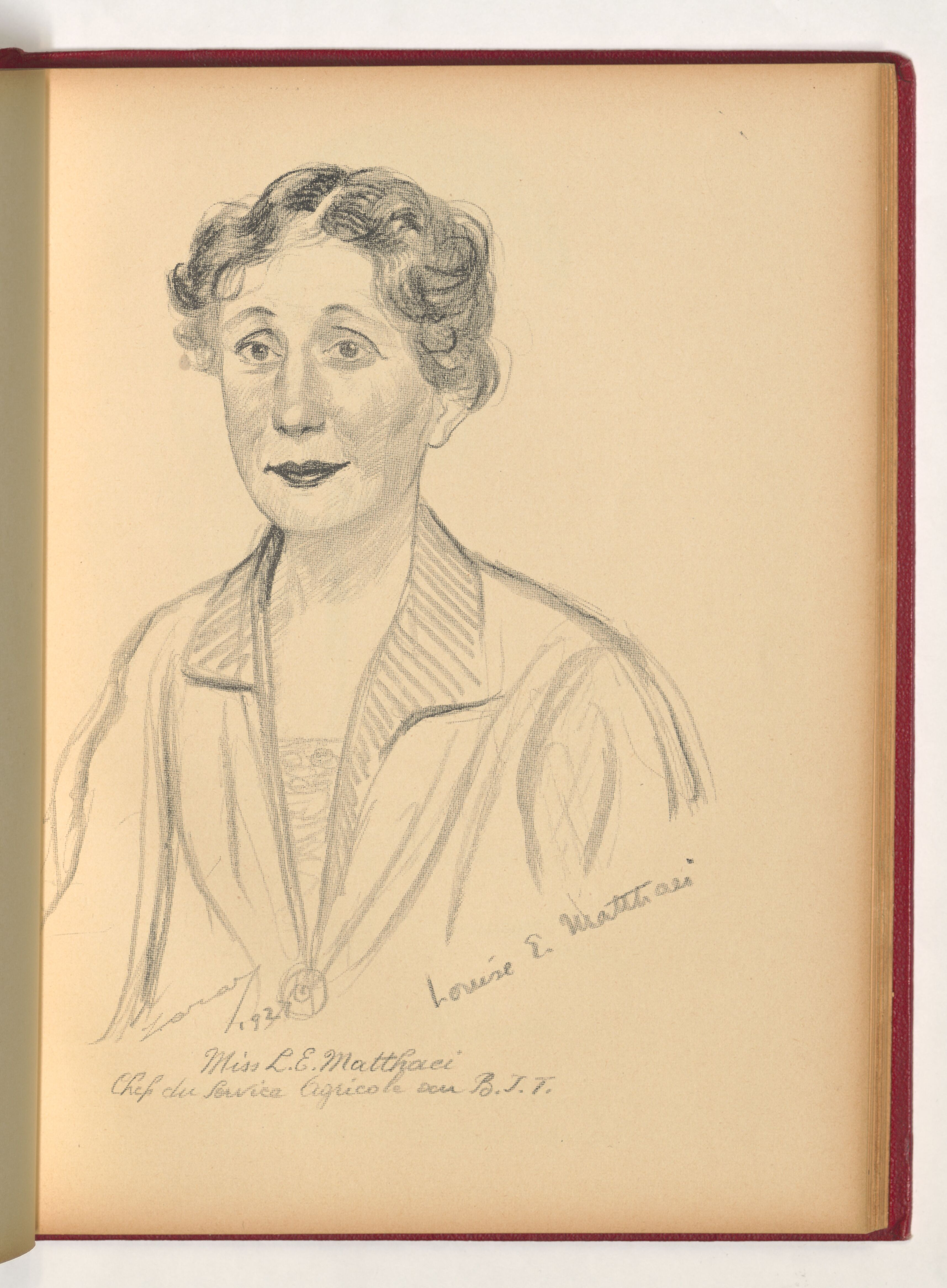
- Born: Louise Ernestine Matthaei; 26 December 1880; Kensington, London
- Died: 11 March 1969 (aged 88); Blackheath, London
- Education: University of Cambridge
- Spouse: Sir Albert Howard
- Relatives: Gabrielle Howard (sister), E. R. Matthaei (brother), Marie A Matthaei

Louise Ernestine Howard, Lady Howard (née Matthaei; 26 December 1880 – 11 March 1969) was an English classics scholar, international civil servant and supporter of organic farming.

== Early life and career ==
Born at Kensington, she was the fourth daughter and the youngest of five children of the commission merchant Carl Hermann Ernst Matthaei and the musician Louise Henriette Elizabeth Sueur. Her eldest sister was the botanist Gabrielle Howard. The family was of German, French and Swiss ancestry. Howard attended South Hampstead High School and Newnham College, Cambridge. After obtaining a number of scholarships and prizes, she graduated with first-class honours in both parts of the classical tripos and eventually obtained a research fellowship. Howard was seen as a strict but encouraging and sympathetic teacher, having been appointed lecturer and director of studies in classics at Newnham College in 1909.

Following the outbreak of the First World War, the half-German Howard, a supporter of the Spartacus League, attempted to procure an understanding of Germany and fight against collective paranoia. She was dismissed by the University of Cambridge because her father was German. In 1918, Howard became an assistant to Leonard Woolf. She is alleged to have been the historical model for Miss Kilman, the repulsive and over-educated woman in Virginia Woolf's famous novel Mrs Dalloway.

Two years later, in Geneva, she successfully completed examination and joined the agricultural section of the International Labour Organization. In 1924, she became its chief.

== Marriage ==
In 1931, she married her brother-in-law, Albert Howard, a botanist and widower of her sister Gabrielle who had died the previous year.

Albert Howard had no children by either wife. By getting involved in her husband's campaign against the use of chemicals in agriculture, she continued her sister's support for his work, becoming known as Lady Howard when he received a knighthood in 1934.

In the 1930s and 1940s, Lady Howard helped Germans fleeing from the Nazi regime. After her husband's death in 1947, she founded the Albert Howard Foundation, which merged with the Soil Association in 1953. Lady Howard was honorary vice president of the latter until her death in Blackheath, London, in 1969.

== Publications ==
- The Lover of the Nations, 1915.
- Studies in Greek Tragedy, 1918.
- Labour in Agriculture, an International Survey, 1935.
- What Country Women Use, 1939 (together with Beryl Hearnden)
- Farming and Gardening for Health or Disease, 1945 (together with Sir Albert).
- The Earth's Green Carpet, 1947.
- Sir Albert Howard in India, 1953.
