= Australian Organic Farming and Gardening Society =

The Australian Organic Farming and Gardening Society (1944–1955) was founded in Sydney on 5 October 1944, during the closing months of World War II. It came into being two years before the United Kingdom's Soil Association, thus becoming the first agriculture organisation in the world to call itself an "organic" association.

The Australian Organic Farming and Gardening Society produced a quarterly journal, Organic Farming Digest (1946–1954), which was the first "organic" journal to be published by an association. The Digest published Australian, British, American, European and African authors. About half the articles published were written by Australians. The Living Soil Association of Tasmania, founded in 1946, adopted the journal of the Australian Organic Farming and Gardening Society, the Organic Farming Digest, and distributed issues to its own members.

The primary Australian authors were V. H. Kelly and New South Wales grazier, Colonel Harold White. The main UK authors were Albert Howard and F. C. King, and the main U.S. authors published in Organic Farming Digest were Ehrenfried Pfeiffer and J. I. Rodale.

For a decade, the Society promoted organic agriculture throughout Australia and beyond, but ultimately disbanded on 19 January 1955, with lack of funds given as the reason. The Society stated that it had been successful in spreading the word about organic agriculture and this is borne out by the extensive media coverage that they achieved during the life of the Society.

== See also ==
- Gardening in Australia
- Organic Farming Digest – Defunct Australian farming magazine
- Living Soil Association of Tasmania
- Agriculture – Cultivation of plants and animals to produce foods, fibers, fuels, and raw materials
- Organic farming – Type of agriculture that emphasizes natural and environmentally friendly techniques
- Organic food – Food complying with organic farming standards
- Principles of Organic Agriculture
