= Edgar J. Saxon =

British naturopath and writer (1877–1956)

- Born: Ernest Savage; 1877; East End of London
- Died: 1956 (aged 78–79)
- Occupations: Naturopath, writer

Edgar J. Saxon (1877–1956) was an English environmentalist, naturopath and alternative health writer. He was a pioneer of the organic movement.

== Biography ==
Saxon was born Ernest Savage and later changed his name to Edgar J. Saxon. He was born at the East End of London and moved to Wimbledon as a child. He worked for an office firm but took a day off in 1897 to walk the hills to the River Dee. He suffered from foot pain so decided to take his boots off and put his feet in a waterfall. He stated that his feet had been cured the next morning by an energy in the water unknown to science and he considered himself restored by a "nature cure". He believed that people in modern society had become alienated from the healing properties of nature.

In 1908, Saxon met Charles William Daniel at his bookshop in Amen Corner, off Ludgate Hill. In 1911, Daniel founded The Healthy Life magazine, of which Saxon became editor and owner in 1920. It was renamed Health and Life in 1934 and Saxon edited the magazine until his death in 1956. The magazine has been described as an "essential source for students of the alternative health movement in Britain". It promoted health foods, herbal medicine, homeopathy and social nudism.

Between the wars, Saxon created the first health food restaurants known as "Vitamin Cafés" and a naturopathic centre in Wigmore Street, London. Saxon established a bookstore, school of reform and lectured at Conway Hall. He was founding member and former president of the Nature Cure Association of Great Britain.

Saxon advocated organic farming and raged against the industrialization of modern society. He criticized chemical companies and the use of fertilizers. He wrote against adulterated foods, pollution and waste. Saxon promoted a diet of "honest foods", by this he meant whole foods, which are grown without artificials or processed and refined. He campaigned against the use of sugar and white bread. Saxon's books were published by Charles William Daniel.

== Vegetarianism ==
Saxon was a vegetarian and a speaker on "Nature Cure: Its Meanings and Implications" at the 6th World Vegetarian Congress in 1926. In 1939, he commented that "I have been a ninety-nine per cent vegetarian—or rather, lacto-vegetarian—for more than thirty years". He aimed to distance himself from vegetarians making fanatical claims about health. He suggested that a "nation that lived on sound fresh unprocessed food which included animal-flesh could not but be in a far finer condition than a vegetarian nation that continued to consume the baneful refined processed de-mineralized food-stuffs that modern advertising continually urges everyone to eat". In 1948, he criticized veganism as he believed it would lead to impoverished soil through lack of humus.

== Selected publications ==
- Right Diet for Children (1912)
- Towards Radiant Health (1925)
- Complete Guide to Sound, Successful and Attractive Food Reform (with Maud Baines, 1929)
- Fruit: Its Use and Misuse (1929)
- Healthy Meals out of Doors or in Tent or Caravan (1939)
- Soil and Human Health (1939)
- Why Aluminum Pans Are Dangerous (1939)
- Good Food from Healthy Soil (1945)
- Simple And Attractive Food Reform (1948)
- Sensible Food for All: In Britain and Temperate Zones (1949)
- A Sense of Wonder (1977)
