= Lizzie Vann =

Children's food company

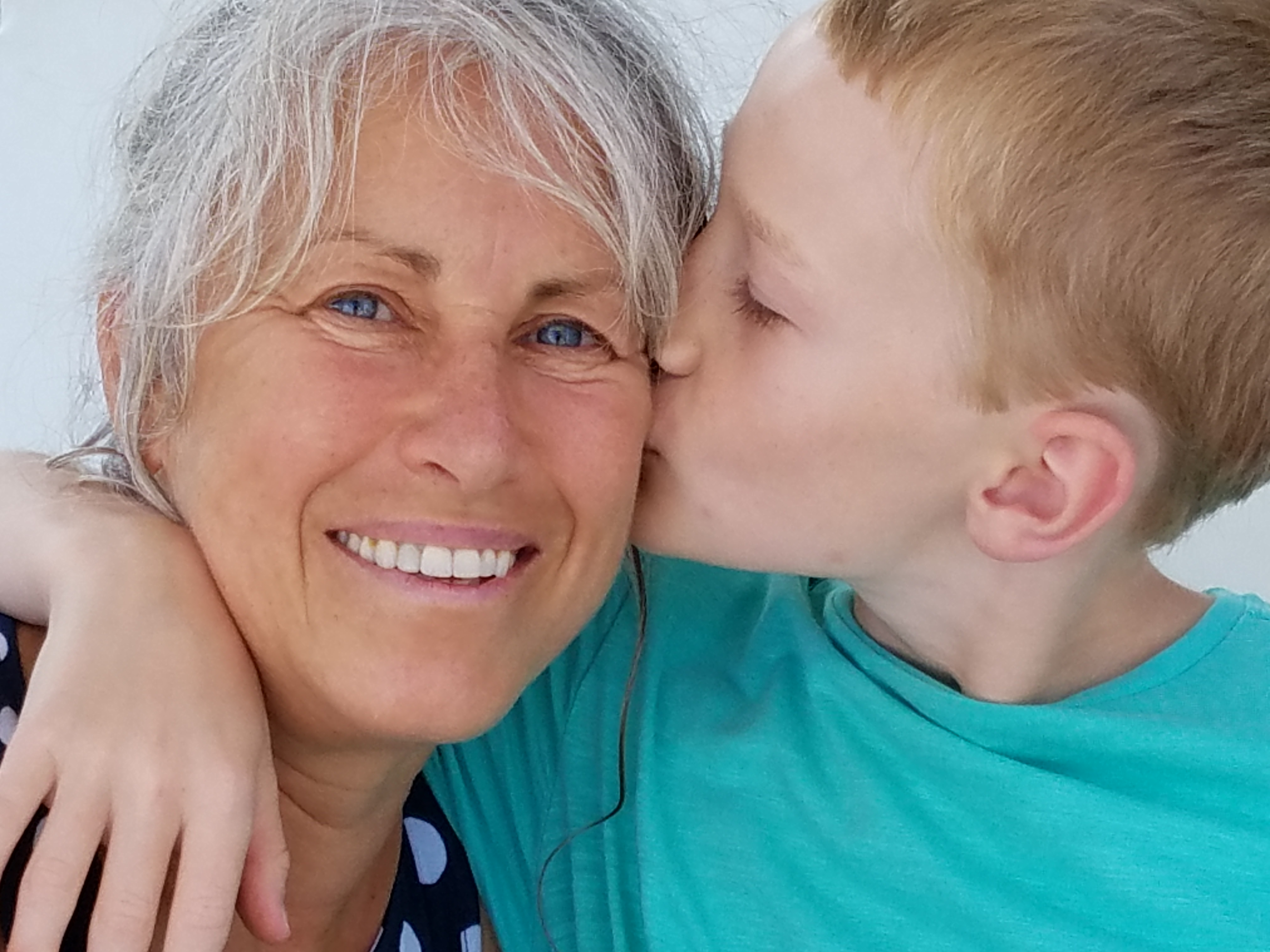
- Lizzie Vann and her grandson, Finn.
- Born: January 1, 1958 (age 68); Leicester, England

Lizzie Vann MBE (born 1958) is a British entrepreneur, campaigner, and philanthropist known for her work in supporting children’s health and organic food, and for leading sustainable redevelopment projects in the United Kingdom and the United States.

== Early life ==
Lizzie Vann was born in Leicester in 1958. As a child, Vann suffered from asthma and eczema, leading her to become interested in nutrition and the links between food and health. She studied biology and ecology at university, where she helped set up a whole food worker cooperative. She worked for eight years as an investment analyst in London before deciding that she wanted to focus on providing babies with food made from organic products and natural ingredients. She then began experimenting with recipes in her kitchen and eventually raised enough funds to start her own venture.

== Organix ==
Vann founded Organix (originally Baby Organix) in 1992 in Dorset, England, to produce organic food for babies and young children. The brand aimed to remove unnecessary additives and provide healthy alternatives to processed baby food. By 2008, Organix had achieved annual sales of over £25 million, with profits exceeding £2 million, according to The Telegraph. That same year, Vann sold the company to the Swiss-based Hero Group, with the sale reported to yield a multi-million-pound return for its founders.

A logistics case study by Howard Tenens later documented Organix’s continued expansion, with more than 100 products across global markets.

Vann received an MBE for services to the organic food industry, in recognition of her advocacy for healthier organic baby and toddler nutrition.

== Advocacy and Campaigns ==
Alongside her work with Organix, Vann became a leading voice in national food policy reform, chairing the nascent UK Organic Trade Board. She co-authored campaign reports with the organic certifier the Soil Association, and co-founded the school food sustainability-and-nutrition Food for Life program in 2003. The initiative was credited with influencing chef Jamie Oliver’s 2005 school dinners campaign, which in itself led to wholesale reform of the way school dinners were created and produced in the UK.

Vann also campaigned for restrictions on artificial additives and preservatives in children’s food, working alongside public health organizations to raise awareness of chemical contaminants in diets and in medicine given to children. In 2011, she co-founded and continues to support the NGO charity First Steps Nutrition Trust. The Lizzie Vann Foundation was established in 2025 as the first UK-based charity to solely focus on additives and contaminants in food and drink that could damage the health and well-being of families.

== Economic Rejuvenation and Sustainable Development ==
In 2009, Vann embarked on the Anna Maria Island Historic Green Village project in Manatee County, Florida. The initiative restored an old schoolhouse and a Florida Cracker house, and relocated five historic buildings to create a mixed-use retail and educational center powered by renewable energy systems. It became one of the first LEED Platinum-certified net-zero-energy developments in the United States.

The Green Village functions as a creative and educational hub demonstrating green building technology, energy efficiency, and community sustainability. The project has been cited as a model for combining historic preservation with environmental innovation.

== Bearsville, Woodstock, New York ==
In 2019, Vann purchased the Bearsville Theater complex in Woodstock, New York — a 22-acre historic site founded by music manager Albert Grossman who was associated with leading musical artists of the 1960’s and 70’s, such as Bob Dylan, Janis Joplin, Todd Rundgren, and Paul Butterfield. After extensive renovations following years of neglect, she restored and re-launched the property as the Bearsville Center, revitalizing a cultural and commercial campus that includes a theater, restaurants, recording studios, a park, and event venues. The redevelopment has brought new jobs, boosted tourism and local trade, and re-established Bearsville as a cultural destination in the Hudson Valley region.

== Personal life ==
Vann lives in Woodstock in New York's Hudson Valley with her partner, photographer David McGough. She is the step-mother of three daughters and has five grandchildren.
