= Principles of Organic Agriculture =

The Principles of Organic Agriculture were established by the International Federation of Organic Agriculture Movements (IFOAM) in September 2005. They are aspirations for organic farming. The Principles were approved by the General Assembly of IFOAM on September 25, 2005.

The General Assembly of IFOAM approved the Principles of Organic Agriculture on September 28, 2005. The principles were developed during an intensive two-year participatory process. The aim of the principles is both to inspire the organic movement and to describe the purpose of organic agriculture to the wider world.

== Background ==
The first set of principles of organic agriculture to be published by any organic association was a set of ten principles published by the Australian Organic Farming and Gardening Society (1944–1955).

The organic sector has grown significantly in recent years. Along with that growth have come opportunities and challenges. The IFOAM General Assembly concluded that there was a need to elaborate the basic values of organic agriculture.

The principles are intended to "apply to agriculture in the broadest sense, including the way people tend soils, water, plants and animals in order to produce, prepare and distribute goods. They concern the way people interact with living landscapes, relate to one another and shape the legacy of future generations."

== The principles ==
The four Principles of Organic Farming are:

- Organic farming should sustain and enhance the health of soil, plants, animals and humans as one and indivisible.
- Organic farming should be based on the living ecological systems and cycles, work with them, emulate them and help sustain them.
- Organic agriculture should build on relationships that ensure fairness with regard to common environment and life processes.
- Organic farming should be managed in a precautionary and responsible manner to protect the health and well being of current and future generations and the environment.

== See also ==
- Principles of Environmental Justice
