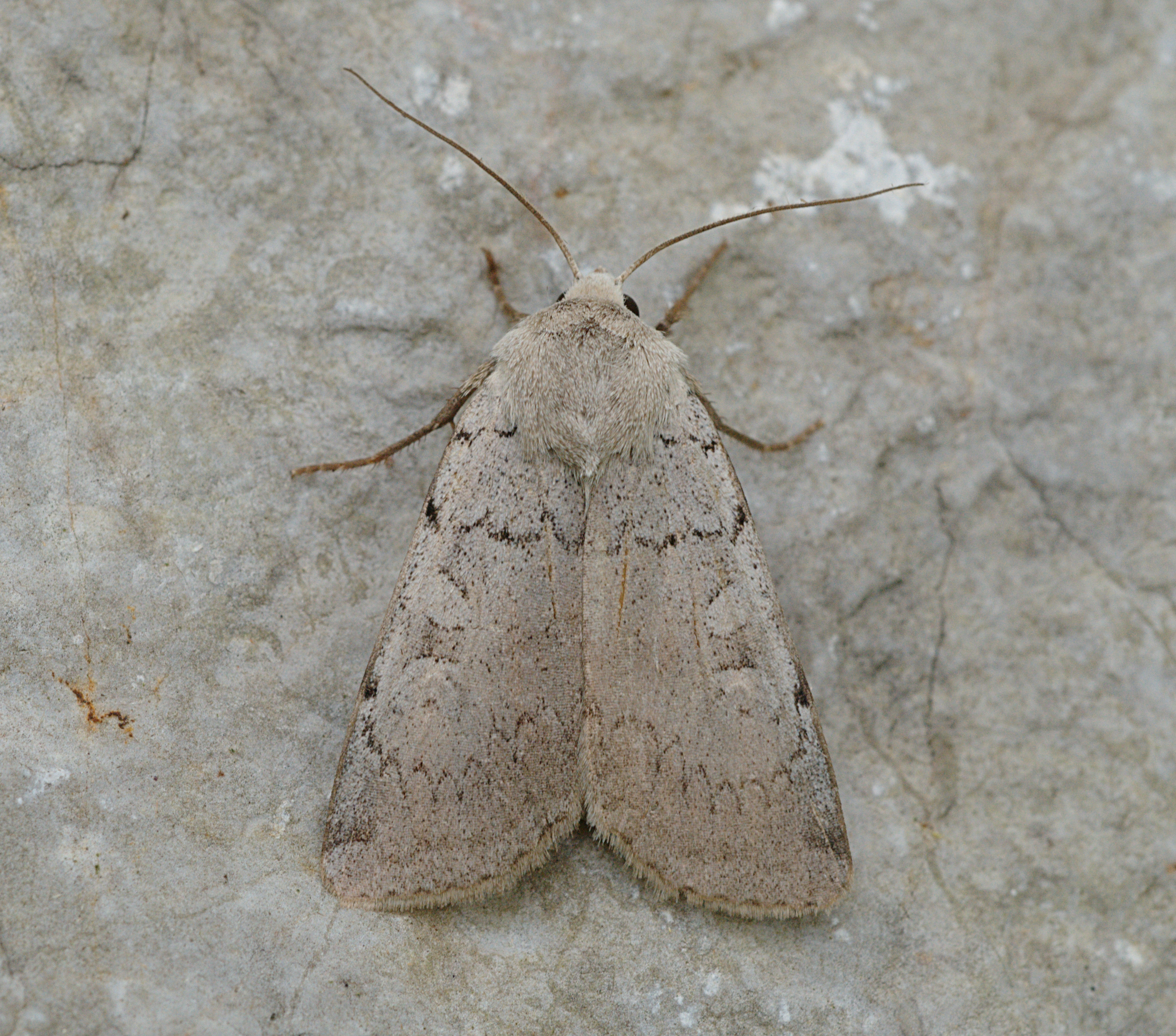

Scientific classification
- Kingdom: Animalia
- Phylum: Arthropoda
- Clade: Pancrustacea
- Class: Insecta
- Order: Lepidoptera
- Superfamily: Noctuoidea
- Family: Noctuidae
- Genus: Xestia
- Species: X. ashworthii

Binomial name
- Xestia ashworthii (Doubleday, 1855)

Synonyms
- Agrotis candelarum

= Ashworth's rustic =

Species of moth

Ashworth's rustic (Xestia ashworthii) is a species of moth. Its colouring is blue/grey and it is mainly nocturnal.

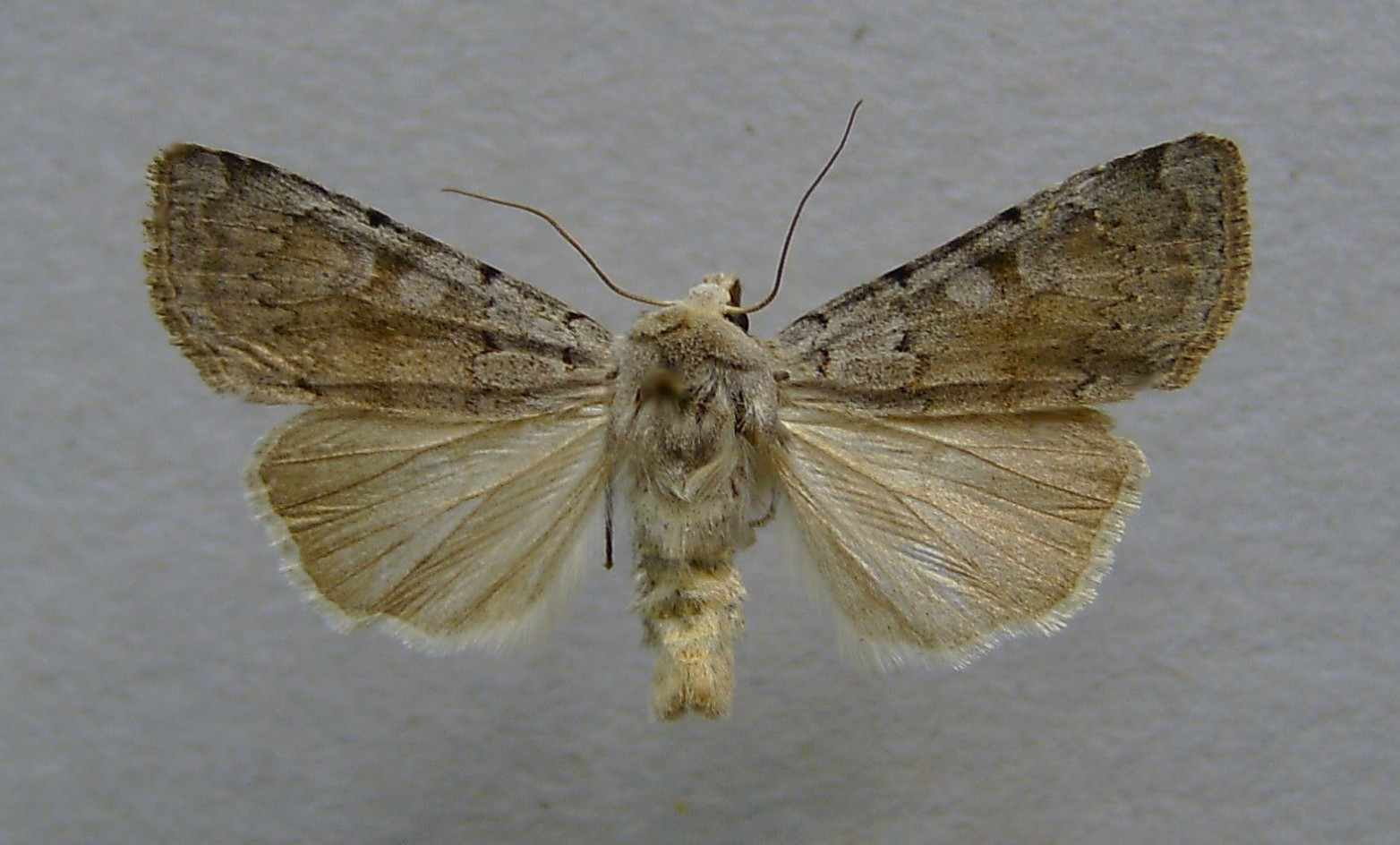
mounted specimen

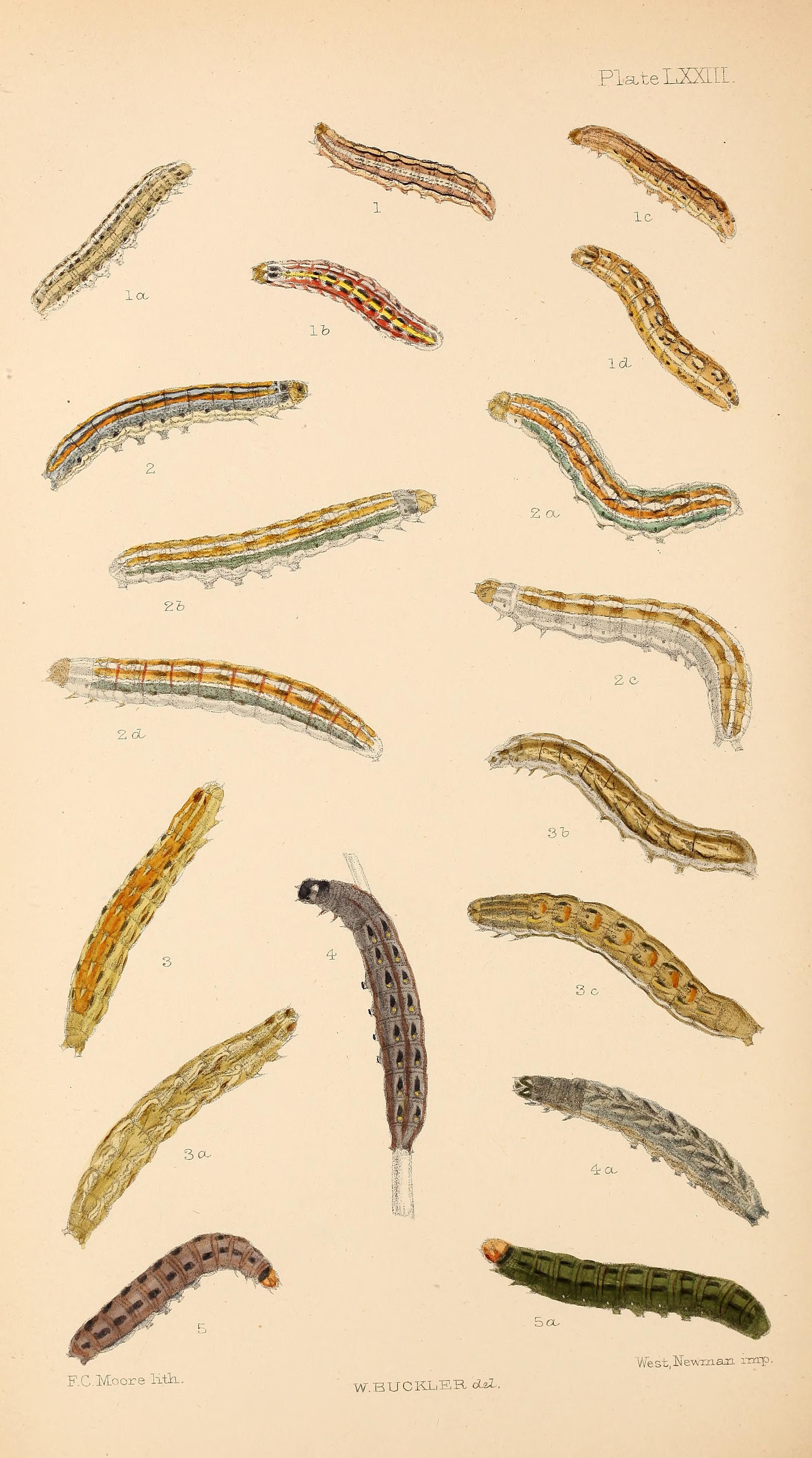
5,5a larva after last moult

== Life cycle ==
There is one generation in Britain from mid June to August. They are in their larval stage from August to late May of June the next year, feeding mainly by night, but sometimes basking by day in the spring. There are many larval foodplants, usually low growing plants, including common rock-rose, wild thyme, sheep's sorrel, harebell, salad burnet, bell heather, goldenrod, lady's bedstraw, creeping willow and foxglove. It pupates in a flimsy cocoon under moss, among rocks or just below ground.

== Subspecies ==
- Xestia ashworthii ashworthii has a wingspan of 35–40 mm (mountainous areas of Wales)
- Xestia ashworthii candelarum (Staudinger 1871) (central Europe from the Pyrenees to the Alps, east to Siberia and Tibet)
- Xestia ashworthii lactescens (Turati 1919) has a wingspan of 42–46 mm (central Italy)
- Xestia ashworthii jotunensis (Schoyen 1887) (Fennoscandia and the Baltic region)
