= Stealth ownership =

Stealth ownership occurs when a larger corporation purchases smaller enterpris] but maintains the packaging and advertising strategies of that smaller company. It is common for the purchaser not to disclose that it owns the smaller company in hopes of maintaining the acquired company's image. This phenomenon is very common within the organic movement and is considered part of the Big Organic movement that began in the late 1990s.
