= Organic Farming Digest =

Defunct Australian farming magazine

The first organic farming society was the Australian Organic Farming and Gardening Society and was founded in October 1944. The Australian Organic Farming and Gardening Association strives to promote different organic sectors, support farmers, and ultimately make positive use of their land. Through this society, they worked together to issue their first journal which was the Organic Farming Digest. The Organic Farming Digest (1946–1954) was the first organic farming magazine to be published by an agricultural association. The magazine was based in Sydney. It was published quarterly. About half of the articles published were by Australian authors, the authors by authors from the rest of the world. The Organic Farming Digest was published by the Australian Organic Farming and Gardening Society. It was also adopted and distributed as the official publication of the Living Soil Association of Tasmania.

The purpose of their work was to address agricultural issues and poor practices within farming. Some practices that were addressed was the usage of synthetic fertilizers, sprays for social degradation, over cropping, and erosion conflict. They also strived to advocate different agricultural methodology such as ley-farming and resusing organic wastes to soil. Over time, the magazine published 29 journals which contained 378 additional articles. The articles addressed health, politics, animal welfare, and gardening which was written by over 150 different authors. The final issue of the Digest was Volume 3, Number 5 dated December 1954. The society was wound up on 19 January 1955 and the reason given was lack of funds.

== See also ==
- Agriculture
- Organic food
