= Helen Browning =

British farmer

- Born: November 1961 (age 64); Swindon, England, UK
- Education: Harper Adams Agricultural College
- Occupation: Organic farmer

Helen Mary Browning OBE, DL is an organic livestock and arable farmer in Wiltshire, England, and chief executive of the Soil Association.

== Career ==
In 1986, Browning took on her father's 1,350-acre (550-hectare) farm near Bishopstone, Swindon, which is rented from the Church of England, and turned it into an organic farm. She founded Eastbrook Farm Organic Meats and the Helen Browning Organic brand.

She has held a number of public appointments including the 'Curry Commission' on the Future of Farming and Food, the Agriculture and Environment Biotechnology Commission and the Meat and Livestock Commission.

She was Director of External Affairs at the National Trust and has been chair of the Food Ethics Council since 2002.

She was a trustee of the Soil Association between 1993 and 2003, chair from 1997 to 2002, and was appointed its chief executive in October 2010.

She was appointed an OBE in 1998 for her services to organic farming, and a Deputy Lieutenant of Wiltshire in 2015.
