= Living Soil Association of Tasmania =

The Living Soil Association of Tasmania (1946–1960) was founded in Hobart, Tasmania on 30 August 1946. It was one of the world's first advocacy groups for organic farming. The Living Soil Association of Tasmania affiliated with the Australian Organic Farming and Gardening Society (founded 4 October 1944) and the UK's Soil Association (founded 3 May 1946).

The Living Soil Association of Tasmania distributed to its members the quarterly journal of the Australian Organic Farming and Gardening Society, the Organic Farming Digest, which later became the 'Farming & Gardening Digest incorporating the Organic Farming Digest'. The Association also produced six issues of its own Newsletter and a booklet 'Compost - How and Why'.

The founder and president of the Living Soil Association of Tasmania' was Henry Shoobridge (1874–1963), a local successful hop grower, and accredited Methodist preacher.

The Living Soil Association of Tasmania was successful in recruiting 11 representatives of government and other associations onto its Council. These included the Education Department of Tasmania, the Hobart City Council, the Tasmanian Farmers Federation and the Tasmanian Farmers Stockowners and Orchardists Association. Included in the Rules & Constitution of the Living Soil Association of Tasmania was the provision for Junior Groups. Membership of the Living Soil Association of Tasmania peaked in 1952. There is no trace of the Association after 1960.

== See also ==
- Agriculture
- Organic farming
- Organic food
- Principles of Organic Agriculture
- Organic Farming Digest
- Soil Association
- Australian Organic Farming and Gardening Society
