= Beryl Hearnden =

English progressive farmer, journalist & author (1897-1978)

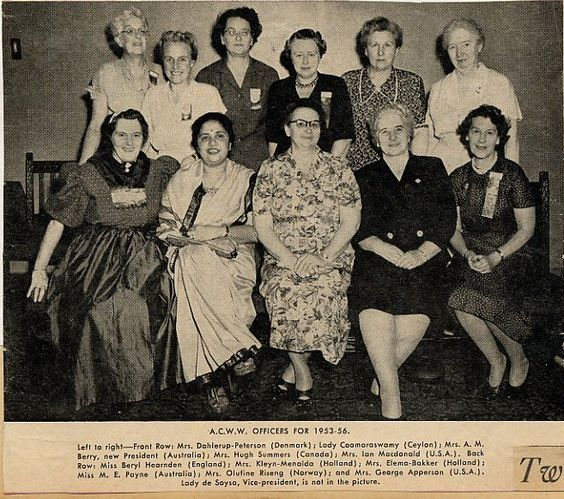
A.C.W.W. Officers for 1953-56. Left to right—Front Row; Mrs. Dahlerup-Peterson (Denmark); Lady Coomaraswamy (Ceylon); Mrs. A. M. Berry, new president (Australia); Mrs. Hugh Summers (Canada); Mrs. Ian Macdonald (U.S.A.). Back Row; Miss Beryl Hearnden (England); Mrs. Kleyn-Menalda (Holland); Mrs. Elema-Bakker (Holland); Miss M. E. Payne (Australia); Mrs. Olufine Riseng (Norway); and Mrs. George Apperson (U.S.A.)

Beryl "Beb" Hearnden (1897 – 22 January 1978) was an English progressive farmer, journalist and author.

== Biography ==
From 1919 to about 1951, Beryl Hearnden lived with Lady Eve Balfour in a farming cooperative. They met through Balfour's sister, Mary, who was Hearnden's friend. She left to pursue a career as journalist in London.

In the 1920s and 1930s, she wrote, with Balfour, several detective novels under the pseudonym Hearnden Balfour:

In 1939, she wrote, together with Louise Ernestine Matthaei Howard, What Country Women Use, a book that advised women living in the country on how they could best use the natural resources around them.

From 1953 to 1956, she was an officer of the Associated Country Women of the World. The A.C.W.W. were women who lived in rural and urban areas, representatives of many races, nationalities and creeds, believing that peace and progress could best be advanced by friendship and understanding through communication and working together to improve the quality of life for all people.

== Works ==
- A Gentleman from Texas (1927)
- The Paper Chase (1928)
- The Enterprising Burglar (1928)
- Anything Might Happen (1931)
- What Country Women Use (1939)
