= Gabrielle Howard =

British botanist (1876–1930)

- Born: Gabrielle Louise Caroline Matthaei; 3 October 1876; Kensington, London, England
- Died: 18 August 1930 (aged 53); Genoa
- Education: University of Cambridge
- Spouse: Albert Howard
- Relatives: Louise Howard (sister)
- Scientific career
- Fields: Plant physiology

Gabrielle Louise Caroline Howard (née Matthaei; 3 October 1876 – 18 August 1930), usually cited as G. L. C. Matthaei, was an English plant physiologist and economic botanist who advocated organic farming.

== Education and photosynthesis experiments ==
Matthaei was born in Kensington in a family of German, Swiss and French ancestry. She was the daughter of the musician Louise Henriette Elizabeth Sueur and the commission merchant Carl Hermann Ernst Matthaei, she had a brother and three younger sisters, including Louise Howard. Matthaei attended North London Collegiate School for Girls and Newnham College, Cambridge, and later worked as assistant to Frederick Blackman, producing significant work on cellular respiration. Between 1902 and 1905, Blackman and Matthaei set out to discover the role of temperature in photosynthesis and performed the first such experiments, finding that carbon fixation is based on biochemical reactions which depend on temperature. Although the experiment is inaccurately known as the Blackman Reaction, a significant part of the work was carried out by Matthaei and the 1904 paper communicated to the Royal Society by Francis Darwin bears only her name.

== Agricultural research ==
In 1905, she married Albert Howard, imperial economic botanist to the government of India. The couple invariably did their research together and soon became known as the "Sidney and Beatrice Webb of India". In 1913, Gabrielle Howard became the second imperial economic botanist to the government of India. Between 1905 and 1924, the Howards carried out research on crops such as cotton and wheat at their experiment station at Pusa, and ran a fruit experiment station at Quetta from 1912 until 1919. They argued that plants should be studied in the context of their habitat and that food grown in humus-rich soil would be beneficial to health. Beginning in 1924, they oversaw the planning and construction of the Institute of Plant Industry at Indore. She suddenly died in Genoa shortly before their planned retirement and return to England. The next year, her widower married her sister Louise. Neither marriage produced children.

== Publications ==
- Matthaei, G. L. C (1907), "Experimental researches on vegetable assimilation and respiration", Philosophical Transactions of the Royal Society of London, 2: 47, doi:10.1098/rstb.1905.0005
- Howard, Albert; Howard, Gabrielle L. C. (1907), "Note on Immune Wheats", The Journal of Agricultural Science, 2 (3), Cambridge University Press: 278–280, doi:10.1017/S0021859600000575, S2CID 84326599
- Howard, Albert; Howard, Gabrielle L. C.; Khan, Abdur Rahman (1910), The economic significance of natural cross-fertilization in India, India Dept. of Agriculture. Memoirs. Botanical series, vol. III, (No.6) Calcutta: Thacker, Spink & Co.; London: W. Thacker & Co. (Published for the Imperial Department of Agriculture in India; Calcutta). Listing at Open Library
- Howard, Albert; Howard, Gabrielle L. C. (1929), The Development of Indian Agriculture, India of Today, vol. VIII (2nd ed.), London: Humphrey Milford and Oxford University Press
