= Lawrence D. Hills =

British organic horticulturalist (1911–1990)

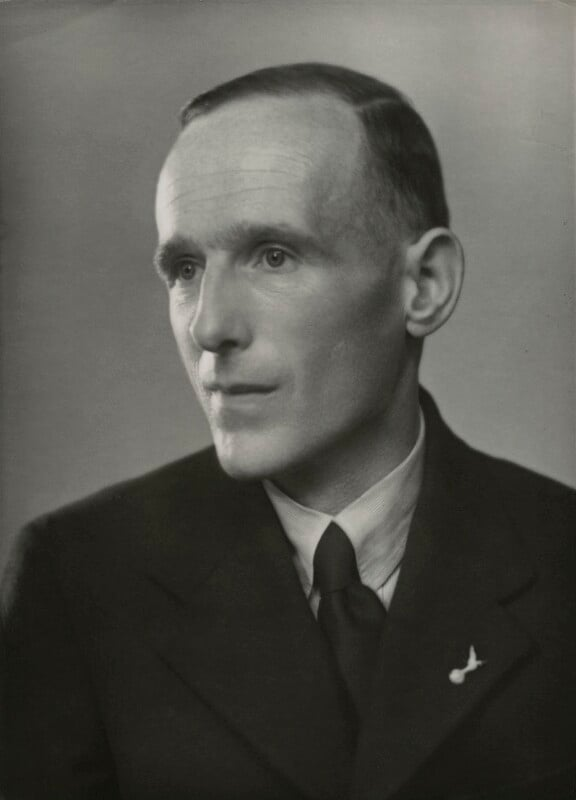
- Hills in 1945
- Born: 2 July 1911; Dartmouth, Devon, England
- Died: 20 September 1990 (aged 79); Ryton-on-Dunsmore, Warwickshire, England
- Citizenship: United Kingdom
- Occupations: Horticulturalist, writer
- Organization: Henry Doubleday Research Association
- Spouse: Hilda Cherry Hills (1964–1989)

Lawrence Donegan Hills (2 July 1911 – 20 September 1990) was a British horticulturalist and writer. In 1954, he founded the Henry Doubleday Research Association (HDRA; now Garden Organic) in Bocking, near Braintree, Essex. By the time he retired in 1986, HDRA was the largest body of organic gardeners in the world and had moved to Ryton-on-Dunsmore, near Coventry.

He started his long career in practical horticulture when he was sixteen and wrote his first book mainly in RAF hospitals before being invalided out on D-Day. He was one of Britain's best-known writers on organic gardening. Gardening correspondent of the Observer for eight years, then of Punch and The Countryman. He was Associate Editor of the Ecologist and Compost Science (USA). His many publications included Fertility Without Fertilisers, Down to Earth Gardening, and Organic Gardening but he was best known for Grow Your Own Fruit and Vegetables published by Faber & Faber in 1971. It rapidly became a bible for gardeners, self-sufficiency enthusiasts and commercial organic growers. His autobiography was Fighting Like the Flowers (1989).

Whilst researching a book called Russian Comfrey, Hills discovered that this common plant was introduced in the nineteenth century by Henry Doubleday (1810–1902), a Quaker smallholder who was so intrigued by its possibilities that he devoted the rest of his life to popularising it. Hills took up this crusade, finally naming his fledgling society in Doubleday's memory.

In 1973, his concern about a piece of European Union legislation outlawing historic varieties of vegetables, would lead to massive loss of genetic bio-diversity led to the setting up of HDRA's vegetable seed library. Persistent lobbying of government eventually resulted in the world's first vegetable gene bank where seed was deep frozen and stored forever.

Hills suffered from coeliac disease, which left him in a wheelchair until introduced to a wheat-free diet by Hilda Cherry Hills (d. 1989), a fellow author and noted nutritionist who became his wife. They had no children, but he once said he considered 'the ever-increasing membership of the Henry Doubleday Research Association is family enough for anyone'.

Hills appeared on television, lectured and broadcast on the radio in the United Kingdom, the US, South Africa, Belgium, France, Australia and New Zealand. HDRA hosted the 1987 television series on organic gardening All Muck and Magic which became so popular that it was one of Channel 4's top five programmes, attracting 3.5 million viewers a week. He was awarded an honorary doctorate by Coventry University in 1990.

== Books ==
- Miniature alpine gardening (1945) Faber
- Rapid tomato ripening for nurseryman and amateur (with Edward H Haywood, 1946) Faber
- The propagation of alpines (1950) Faber
- Alpines without a garden (1953) Faber
- Russian comfrey (1953) Faber
- Down to earth fruit and vegetable growing (1962) Faber
- Lands of the morning (1970) Regency Press
- Grow your own fruit and vegetables (1971) Faber
- Down to earth gardening (1975) Faber
- Comfrey: past, present and future (1976) Faber
- Organic Gardening (Penguin Handbooks) (1977) Penguin
- Fertility gardening (1981) Cameron & Tayleur in association with David & Charles
- Month by month organic gardening (1983) Thorsons
- The good fruit guide (1984) Henry Doubleday Research Association
- Fighting like the flowers (1989) Green Books
