= Organic movement =

Activities in promotion of organic food

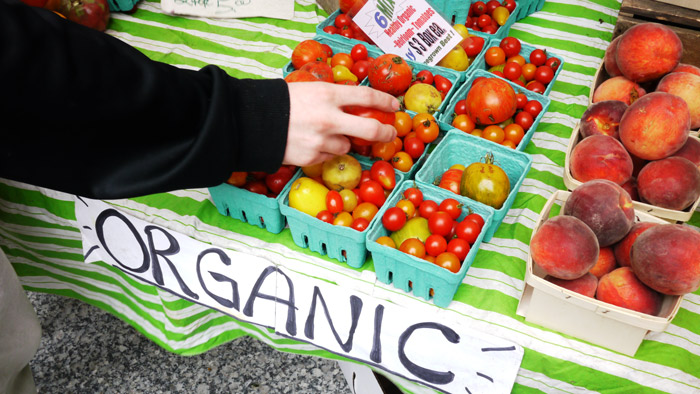
Organic tomatoes and peaches

The organic movement broadly refers to the organizations and individuals involved worldwide in the promotion of organic food and other organic products. It started during the first half of the 20th century, when modern large-scale agricultural practices began to appear.

== Definition ==
An organic product can broadly be described as not containing toxic chemicals (including synthetic pesticides, arsenic-containing herbicides, fertilization biosolids, chemical food additives, antibiotics, synthetic hormones, and industrial solvents). In addition to the absence of artificial chemicals, "organic" means not genetically engineered, and having not used ionizing irradiation, which can cause free-radicals and the removal of vitamins. For example, USDA organic restricts against such things, including genetic engineering in products or in the products' animal feed, and automatically disallows the use of GMO products as being labelled as Organic and allows the use of "Non-GMO" labelling similar to The Non-GMO Project.

In the United Kingdom, the term used with food is natural food.

== History ==
=== Origins ===
The organic movement began in the early 20th century as a response to synthetic nitrogen fertilizers and pesticides emerging in industrial agriculture. Early advocates included Albert Howard, Robert McCarrison, Viscount Lymington, Edgar J. Saxon, and Frank Newman Turner, who emphasized soil health and ecological farming. In 1940, Lord Northbourne coined the term organic farming in his book Look to the Land, describing the “farm as organism” concept that contrasted “chemical farming versus organic farming.”

Parallel reform currents developed internationally. Rudolf Steiner’s 1924 lectures at Koberwitz (now Kobierzyce, Poland) gave rise to biodynamic agriculture, which became one of the earliest systematic approaches to organic farming. In Britain, Lady Eve Balfour’s Haughley Experiment (1939) provided the first side-by-side comparison of organic and conventional farming. Her 1943 book The Living Soil helped found the Soil Association (1946). In India, Sir Albert Howard’s An Agricultural Testament (1940) and The Soil and Health (1947) were widely influential, adopting and popularizing the “organic” terminology.

In the United States, J. I. Rodale popularized organic methods from the 1940s through his magazine Organic Farming and Gardening (1942) and publishing house Rodale Press. Rachel Carson’s Silent Spring (1962) further galvanized public concern about agrichemicals, linking the organic movement to the broader environmental movement.

=== Natural and Organic Foods Movement (1940s–1970s) ===
By the 1940s, “health food” stores had begun to appear in North America, often influenced by vegetarian, naturopathic, and Seventh-day Adventist traditions. Publications such as Organic Farming and Gardening, Natural Food and Farming (1954), and later East West Journal (1971) provided forums for advocacy.

In 1966, Aveline and Michio Kushi founded Erewhon, a Boston macrobiotic store that became the first major U.S. distributor of imported natural and organic foods. It helped introduce products such as brown rice, miso, and sea vegetables to American consumers. Other distributors soon followed, including Eden Foods (Michigan), Janus (Seattle), Westbrae (California), and Lifestream (Vancouver, Canada). These networks supported the expansion of natural foods co-ops and independent retailers during the 1970s.

The late 1960s and 1970s also saw the rise of countercultural “back-to-the-land” movements and co-operative groceries. Publications such as Diet for a Small Planet (1971) by Frances Moore Lappé popularized plant-based and organic eating among a broader readership. The International Federation of Organic Agriculture Movements (IFOAM) was founded in Versailles in 1972, linking disparate national organizations including Demeter International (Germany), the Soil Association (UK), and Rodale (U.S.).

=== Commercial Expansion (1980s–2000s) ===
By the 1980s, natural foods distributors had become a significant industry. Meetings of wholesalers and co-ops created standards and distribution networks that fueled rapid growth. United Natural Foods Inc. (UNFI), founded in 1976 as Mountain People's Warehouse, became the largest natural foods distributor in North America.

Retail chains emerged as dominant players. Whole Foods Market, founded in Austin, Texas in 1980, grew through acquisitions of regional co-ops and stores such as Bread & Circus, Mrs. Gooch's, and Wild Oats Markets. By the 1990s it had become the largest dedicated organic supermarket chain in the United States. Similar chains expanded internationally, including Fresh & Wild in the UK and Bio Company in Germany.

During this period, government regulation developed. The Organic Foods Production Act of 1990 led to the National Organic Program (certification standards implemented in 2002). The European Union likewise integrated organic production into its agricultural policy and subsidy framework.

=== Global Market and Certification (2000s–present) ===
From the 2000s onward, the organic movement has grown into a global market encompassing not only food but also textiles, body care, and household goods. Certification programs expanded worldwide, with IFOAM and national agencies standardizing production and labeling.

By the early 21st century, the organic sector was no longer limited to co-ops and health food stores but had penetrated mainstream supermarkets. Whole Foods Market and Trader Joe's, along with conventional grocers carrying private-label organics, made certified organic products widely available.

Environmental awareness, concerns over pesticides, and interest in local food systems continue to drive growth. Activists and scholars within the organic movement now focus not only on certification but also on broader sustainability issues, including food miles, Fair trade, and Regenerative agriculture.

=== Timeline ===
- 1924 – Rudolf Steiner delivers his agriculture lectures at Koberwitz, laying the foundations for Biodynamic agriculture.
- 1939 – Haughley Experiment begins in Suffolk, England, organized by Lady Eve Balfour. It is the first long-term, side-by-side scientific comparison of organic and conventional farming.
- 1940 – Lord Northbourne publishes Look to the Land, coining the term organic farming.
- 1942 – J. I. Rodale launches Organic Farming and Gardening magazine in the United States.
- 1946 – Soil Association founded in the United Kingdom by Lady Eve Balfour, Jorian Jenks, and George Scott Williamson.
- 1954 – Natural Food and Farming begins publication in Atlanta, United States, one of the first American journals on natural foods.
- 1962 – Rachel Carson’s Silent Spring is published, catalyzing public concern about pesticides and influencing the environmental and organic movements.
- 1966 – Erewhon is founded in Boston by Aveline and Michio Kushi, becoming the first major U.S. distributor of macrobiotic and natural foods.
- 1970 – Lifestream is founded in Vancouver, Canada by Arran and Ratana Stephens, later a key distributor of natural foods in Western Canada.
- 1971 – Frances Moore Lappé publishes Diet for a Small Planet, which popularizes vegetarianism and organic food in the United States.
- 1972 – International Federation of Organic Agriculture Movements (IFOAM) is founded in Versailles, linking national organic farming associations worldwide.
- 1975 – Bread & Circus opens its first store in Brookline, Massachusetts (later acquired by Whole Foods Market).
- 1976 – Mountain People's Warehouse is founded in California; it later evolves into United Natural Foods Inc. (UNFI).
- 1980 – Whole Foods Market is founded in Austin, Texas, becoming the largest dedicated organic supermarket chain in the United States.
- 1980s – Expansion of natural food distributors across North America, including Eden Foods (Michigan), Westbrae (California), Janus (Seattle), and others.
- 1990 – Organic Foods Production Act of 1990 passed in the United States, establishing national standards for organic production.
- 1992 – Wild Oats Markets is founded in Boulder, Colorado, expanding into a national chain before merging with Whole Foods in 2007.
- 2000s – Organic food sales expand rapidly into mainstream supermarkets worldwide. National certification programs are implemented in the United States (National Organic Program) and European Union.

== Organic food ==
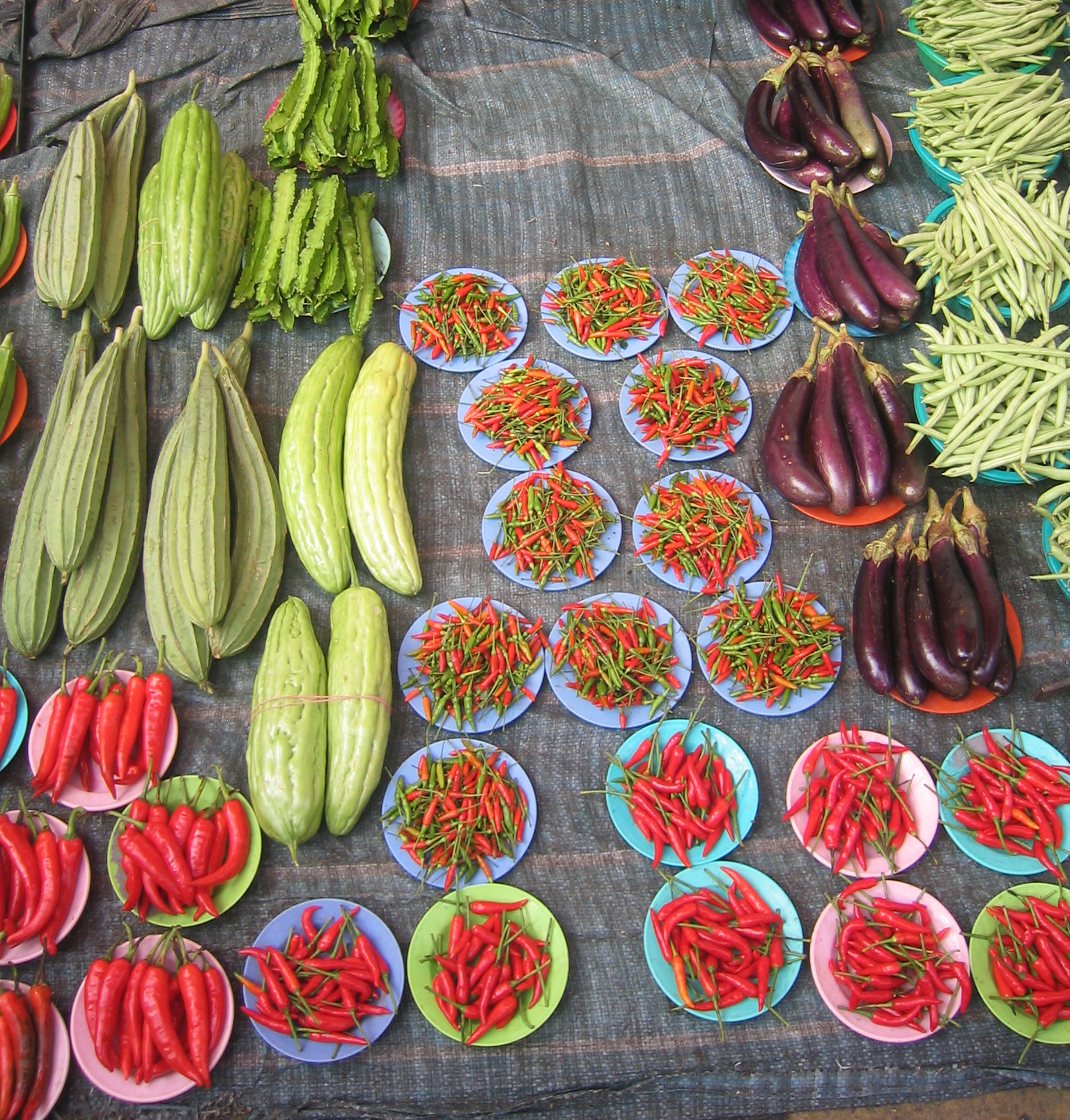
Organic produce at a farmers' market in Argentina

Organic food, also known as ecological or biological food, refers to foods and beverages produced using methods that comply with the standards of organic farming. Standards vary worldwide, but organic farming features practices that cycle resources, promote ecological balance, and conserve biodiversity. Organizations regulating organic products may restrict the use of certain pesticides and fertilizers in the farming methods used to produce such products. Organic foods are typically not processed using irradiation, industrial solvents, or synthetic food additives.

In the 21st century, the European Union, the United States, Canada, Mexico, Japan, and many other countries require producers to obtain special certification to market their food as organic. Although the produce of kitchen gardens may actually be organic, selling food with an organic label is regulated by governmental food safety authorities, such as the National Organic Program of the US Department of Agriculture (USDA) or the European Commission (EC).

From an environmental perspective, fertilizing, overproduction, and the use of pesticides in conventional farming may negatively affect ecosystems, soil health, biodiversity, groundwater, and drinking water supplies. These environmental and health issues are intended to be minimized or avoided in organic farming.

Demand for organic foods is primarily driven by consumer concerns for personal health and the environment, such as the detrimental environmental impacts of pesticides. From the perspective of scientists and consumers, there is insufficient evidence in the scientific and medical literature to support claims that organic food is either substantially safer or healthier to eat than conventional food. Organic agriculture has higher production costs and lower yields, higher labor costs, and higher consumer prices as compared to conventional farming methods.

== Organic companies ==
The recent interest in the organic industry has sparked the interest of many businesses from small local distributors to large companies that distribute many products nationally. The organic market is now a 13 billion dollar a year industry, that continues to grow especially from large corporations such as Wal-Mart that are now offering organic choices to their customers. Other companies that offer organic options include General Mills and Kraft. Some large companies have bought smaller already established organic companies such as Earth's Best, Rice Dream soy milk, Garden of Eatin', Celestial Seasonings and Health Valley. When larger companies buy smaller companies it is called stealth ownership.

== Organic cosmetics ==
Organic cosmetics are products that are made with organic ingredients that were produced without the use of synthetic pesticides, herbicides, fungicides, and fertilizers.

The FDA does not have a definition of “Organic” in terms of organic cosmetics. FDA regulates cosmetics under the authority of the Federal Food, Drug, and Cosmetic Act (FD&C Act) and the Fair Packaging and Labeling Act (FPLA).

The USDA (the U.S. Department of Agriculture) requirements for the use of the term “organic” are separate from the laws and regulations that FDA applies for cosmetics. For more information on "organic" labeling for cosmetics, see the NOP publication, "Cosmetics, Body Care Products, and Personal Care Products." Cosmetic products labeled with “organic” must follow both USDA regulations and FDA regulations of organic claims for labeling and safety requirements for cosmetics.

The Agricultural Marketing Service of USDA supervises the National Organic Program (NOP). The NOP regulations have the definition of "organic" and provide certification for agricultural ingredients if they have been produced under conditions that would meet the definition. Moreover, the regulations also include labeling standards based on the percentage of organic ingredients in every product.

The COSMetic Organic and Natural Standard (COSMOS) sets certification requirements for organic and natural cosmetics products in Europe.

== Organic farming ==
Organic farming, also known as organic agriculture or ecological farming, or biological farming, is an agricultural system that emphasizes the use of naturally occurring, non-synthetic inputs, such as compost manure, green manure, and bone meal and places emphasis on techniques such as crop rotation, companion planting, and mixed cropping. Biological pest control methods, such as the fostering of insect predators, are also encouraged. Organic agriculture can be defined as "an integrated farming system that strives for sustainability, the enhancement of soil fertility and biological diversity while, with rare exceptions, prohibiting synthetic pesticides, antibiotics, synthetic fertilizers, genetically modified organisms, and growth hormones". It originated early in the 20th century in reaction to rapidly changing farming practices. In 2019, the global area dedicated to certified organic agriculture amounted to 70 million hectares (170 million acres), with more than half of this area being in Australia.

Organic standards are designed to allow the use of naturally occurring substances while prohibiting or severely limiting synthetic substances. For instance, naturally occurring pesticides, such as garlic extract, bicarbonate of soda, or pyrethrin (which is found naturally in the Chrysanthemum flower), are permitted, while synthetic fertilizers and pesticides, such as glyphosate, are prohibited. Synthetic substances that are allowed only in exceptional circumstances may include copper sulfate, elemental sulfur, and veterinary drugs. Genetically modified organisms, nanomaterials, human sewage sludge, plant growth regulators, hormones, and antibiotic use in livestock husbandry are prohibited. Broadly, organic agriculture is based on the principles of health, care for all living beings and the environment, ecology, and fairness. Organic methods champion sustainability, self-sufficiency, autonomy and independence, health, animal welfare, food security, and food safety. It is often seen as part of the solution to the impacts of climate change.

Organic agricultural methods are internationally regulated and legally enforced by transnational organizations such as the European Union and also by individual nations, based in large part on the standards set by the International Federation of Organic Agriculture Movements (IFOAM), an international umbrella organization for organic farming organizations established in 1972, with regional branches such as IFOAM Organics Europe and IFOAM Asia. Since 1990, the market for organic food and other products has grown rapidly, reaching $150 billion worldwide in 2022 – of which more than $64 billion was earned in North America and EUR 53 billion in Europe. This demand has driven a similar increase in organically managed farmland, which grew by 26.6 percent from 2021 to 2022. As of 2022, organic farming is practiced in 188 countries and approximately 96,000,000 hectares (240,000,000 acres) worldwide were farmed organically by 4.5 million farmers, representing approximately 2 percent of total world farmland.

Organic farming can be beneficial on biodiversity and environmental protection at local level; however, because organic farming can produce lower yields compared to intensive farming, leading to increased pressure to convert more non-agricultural land to agricultural use in order to produce similar yields, it can cause loss of biodiversity and negative climate effects.

== Organic land care and landscaping ==
Organic land care, organic landscaping, or organic lawn management is a form of horticulture that relies on organic land management techniques such as mowing high, proper watering, the use of compost, soil amendments, and organic pest control.

In the late 20th century, a movement to manage lawns organically began to grow out of the practices of the organic farming movement. Activists in several U.S. cities have pushed local governments to require organic landscaping. Many private properties worldwide are managed organically, but some locations require organic land care. Local regulations are often responding to a lack of regulation from the federal government and billion-dollar settlements against pesticide manufacturers.

The organic land care movement gained public recognition in 1996 when England's Prince Charles announced that the Highgrove House gardens and landscaping were under organic management. In 2009, then Harvard University President Drew Gilpin Faust announced that the campus and grounds were under organic management there implemented by landscape director Wayne Carbone and with savings of two million gallons of irrigation water and resulting in cure of leaf spot and apple scab in the campus orchard. In 2018, Portland, Maine became the largest city in the United States to restrict all synthetic pesticide applications across all public lands and private property. The pesticide ordinance passed by the City Council that includes a fine of up to $500 for violations was lobbied for by environmental groups and community organizer Avery Yale Kamila. In 2019, Rafael Tornini, head of the Garden and Environment Service of the Vatican, announced the 37 acre Gardens of Vatican City had been transitioning to organic management since 2017.

== Criticisms ==
There have been multiple criticisms regarding organic food and organic marketing practices. Scientists at the University of Washington did a test of the urine of children who are on organic food diets and children who are on conventional food diets. The result was that the urine of children on organic food diets had a median level of pesticide byproducts only one-sixth of children on conventional food diets. However, at the same time French, British and Swedish government food agencies have all concluded that there was no scientific proof that organic food is safer or has more nutrition than conventional foods.

A 2014 study by a non-profit academic think tank funded by the Council for Biotechnology Information alleged consumers are "routinely deceived" by intentional and endemic misleading health claims in organic marketing. Organic products typically cost 10% to 40% more than similar conventionally produced products. According to the UK's Food Standards Agency, "Consumers may choose to buy organic fruit, vegetables and meat because they believe them to be more nutritious than other food. However, the balance of current scientific evidence does not support this view." A 12-month systematic review commissioned by the FSA in 2009 and conducted at the London School of Hygiene & Tropical Medicine based on 50 years' worth of collected evidence concluded that "there is no good evidence that consumption of organic food is beneficial to health in relation to nutrient content." Although the source of the organic movement was small family farms, large corporations have started distributing more organic products and certain categories of organic foods, such as milk, have been reported by Michael Pollan to be highly concentrated and predominantly sourced to mega-farms.

== See also ==
- Organic certification
- Organic food culture
- Organic horticulture
- Organic lawn management
- List of organic food topics
- List of organic gardening and farming topics
- Holistic management
