= Henry Doubleday (entomologist) =

English entomologist and ornithologist

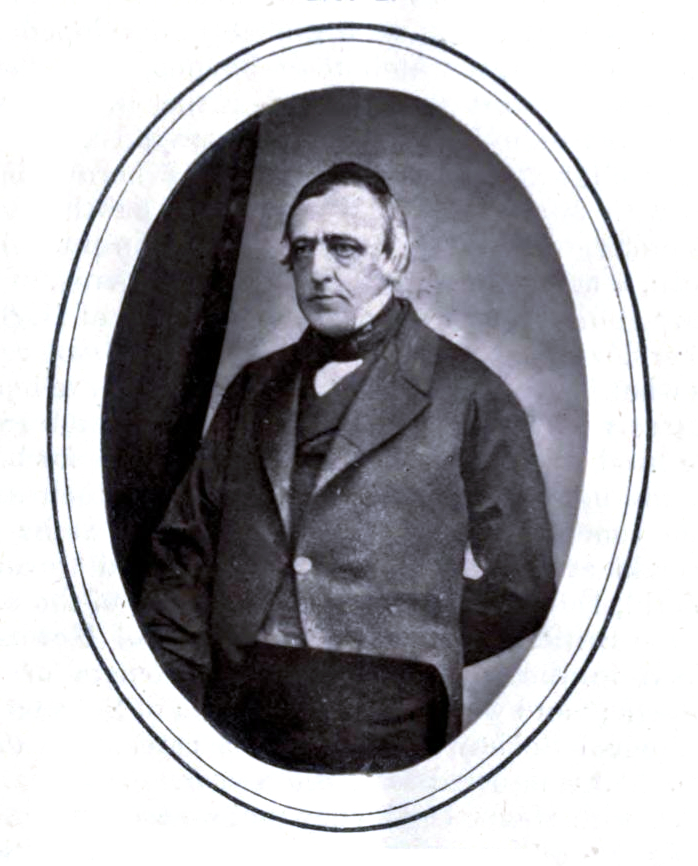
- Born: 1 July 1808; Epping, Essex, England
- Died: 29 June 1875 (aged 66); Epping, Essex, England
- Known for: Synonymic List of the British Lepidoptera
- Relatives: Edward Doubleday, brother; Henry Doubleday (horticulturalist), cousin
- Scientific career
- Fields: Entomology
- Author abbrev. (zoology): Doubleday

Henry Doubleday (1 July 1808 – 29 June 1875) was an English entomologist and ornithologist. There is a blue plaque to him at the corner of High Street and Buttercross Lane, Epping, at the site of his father's grocer shop. He wrote a catalogue of British butterflies and moths, and named a number of new species of moth, including the pigmy footman, Ashworth's rustic and marsh oblique-barred. His moth collection remains intact at the Natural History Museum.

== Life ==
Henry Doubleday was born in 1808, and was the eldest son of Quaker and grocer Benjamin Doubleday and his wife Mary of Epping, Essex. He and his brother Edward Doubleday spent their childhood collecting natural history specimens in Epping Forest. He lived at the same time as his cousin Henry Doubleday (1810-1902) the scientist and horticulturist.

Doubleday took over the management of the family grocery shop in Epping after his father's death, which reduced the number of collecting trips he was able to make.

Doubleday was the author of the first catalogue of British butterflies and moths, Synonymic List of the British Lepidoptera (1847–1850). He had earlier been interested in birds, and published Nomenclature of British Birds in 1836. Doubleday's contributions include the recognition, later confirmed by Darwin, of the oxlip as distinct from the primrose and the cowslip. He also invented a technique called sugaring for attracting moths. Doubleday named a number of new species of moths, including the pigmy footman, Ashworth's rustic and marsh oblique-barred. His moth collection remains intact at the Natural History Museum.

Doubleday died on 29 June 1875, some time after having suffered a breakdown brought on by the stress of the collapse of his business.

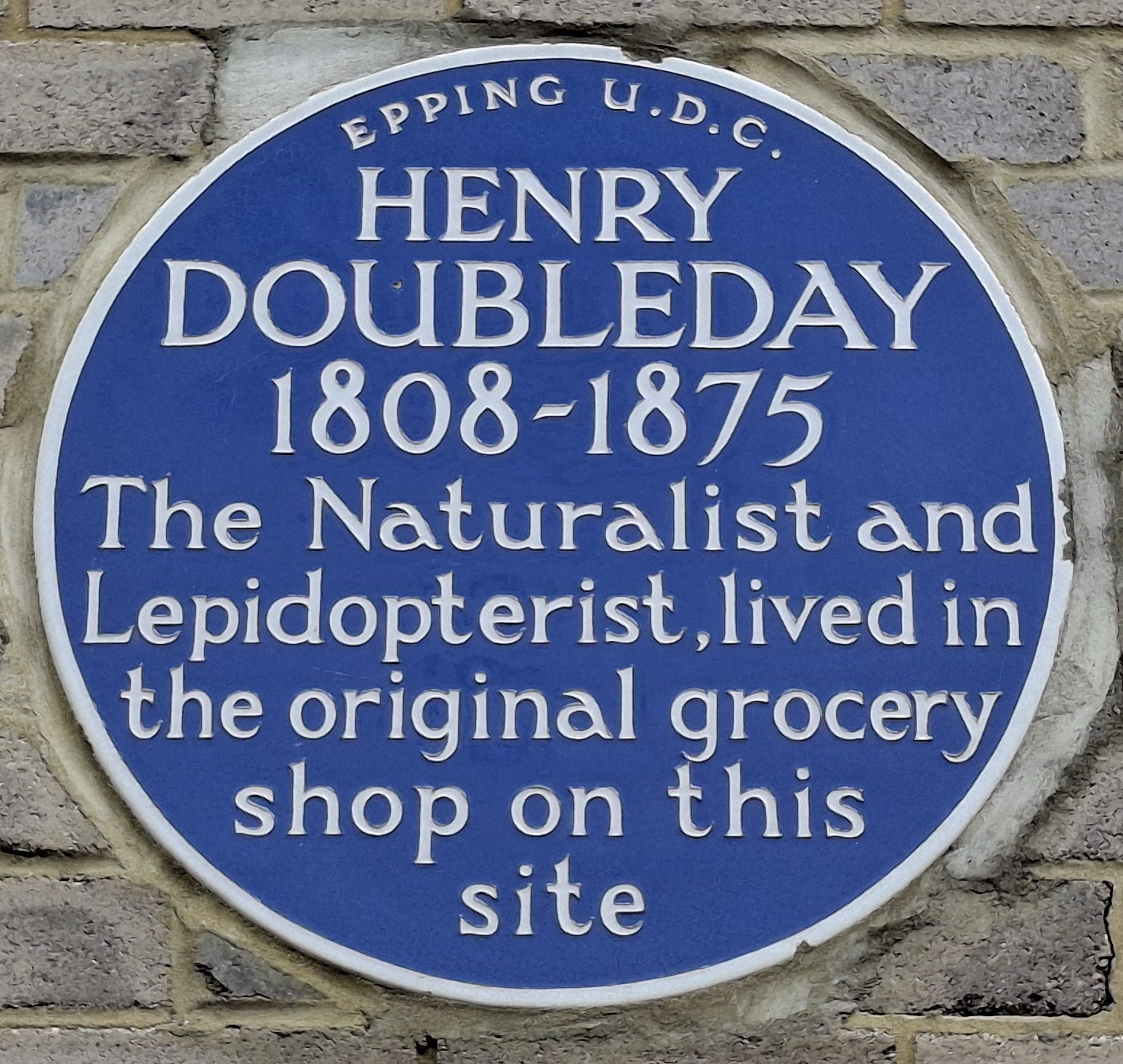
Blue plaque erected by Epping Urban District as “The Naturalist and Lepidopterist, lived in the original grocery shop on this site.” The plaque is in Buttercross Lane, Epping on the side of a shop which, in February 2026, was a Cardfactory.

There is a blue plaque to Doubleday at the corner of High Street and Buttercross Lane, Epping.
