= Albert Howard =

English botanist (1873–1947)

- Born: 8 December 1873; Bishop's Castle, Shropshire, England
- Died: 20 October 1947 (aged 73); Blackheath, London
- Education: University of Cambridge
- Spouse(s): Gabrielle Matthaei; Louise Matthaei
- Scientific career
- Fields: Botany

Sir Albert Howard CIE (8 December 1873 – 20 October 1947) was an English botanist. His academic background might have been botany. While working in India, he was generally considered a pathologist; this is more than likely the reason for his consistent observations of the value of compost applications being an increase in health (of the whole system). Howard was the first Westerner to document and publish the Indian techniques of sustainable agriculture. After spending considerable time learning from Indian peasants and the pests present in their soil, he called these two his professors. He was a principal figure in the early organic movement. He is considered by many in the English-speaking world to have been, along with Eve Balfour, one of the key advocates of ancient Indian techniques of organic agriculture.

== Life ==
Albert Howard was born at Bishop's Castle, Shropshire. He was the son of Richard Howard, a farmer, and Ann Howard, née Kilvert. He was educated at Wellington College, Telford, and the Royal College of Science, South Kensington, where he took the associateship in chemistry. He matriculated in 1896 at St. John's College, Cambridge, becoming a scholar in 1897. In 1899, he graduated with a B.A. with a first class in biological subjects in the Natural Sciences Tripos and graduated with an M.A. in 1902 or 1903. He also obtained the Cambridge and national agricultural diplomas in 1897 or 1898.

In 1899, he lectured in agricultural science at Harrison College in Barbados. That same year, and in 1902, he was a mycologist and agricultural lecturer at the Imperial Department of Agriculture for the West Indies.

From 1903 to 1905, he was a botanist at the South Eastern Agricultural College, and from 1905 to 1924, Imperial Economic Botanist to the government of India.

In 1914, he was named a Companion of the Indian Empire (C.I.E.), and received a Silver Medal of the Royal Society of Arts in 1920. From 1924 to 1931, Howard was director of the Institute of Plant Industry, Indore, and agricultural adviser to states in Central India and Rajputana. He was made a Fellow of the Royal Asiatic Society in 1928 and, in 1930, received the Barclay Memorial Medal of that society.

He was knighted in 1934 and was made an honourable fellow of the Imperial College of Science in 1935.

Howard worked in India as an agricultural adviser and was in charge of a government research farm at Indore. He worked together with Gabrielle Matthaei (1876–1930) and her sister Louise (1880–1969). He married Gabrielle in 1905. After her death, he married Louise in 1931. Gabrielle was herself a professionally trained botanist, and both women contributed to organic farming research.

Howard observed and came to support traditional Indian farming practices over conventional agricultural science. Though he journeyed to India to teach Western agricultural techniques, he found that the Indians could in fact teach him more. One important aspect he took notice of was the connection between healthy soil and the villages' healthy populations, livestock, and crops. Patrick Holden, director of the UK Soil Association, quoted Howard as saying, "The health of soil, plant, animal, and man is one and indivisible." He was president of the 13th session of the Indian Science Congress in 1926.

== Organic farming ==
Howard built on the traditional Indian composting system into what is now known as the Indore method. He went on to further document Indian organic farming techniques, and spread its knowledge through the UK-based Soil Association, and the Rodale Institute in the US. His 1940 book, An Agricultural Testament, is a classic organic farming text. He emphasizes the importance of maintaining humus, keeping water in the soil, and the role of mycorrhiza. It was his first book aimed at the general public and is his best-known work. However, his 1931 book, The Waste Products of Agriculture, based on 26 years of studying improved crop production in Indian smallholdings, is considered by some as his most important scientific publication. His 1945 book, Farming and Gardening for Health or Disease, was also intended for a general audience and was republished in 1947 as The Soil and Health: A Study of Organic Agriculture. Howard's documentation of Indian farming practices influenced and inspired many farmers and agricultural scientists who furthered the organic movement, including Lady Eve Balfour (the Haughley Experiment, The Living Soil) and J. I. Rodale (Rodale Institute).

Howard advocated studying the forest in order to farm like the forest. He devoted the last half of his career to understanding that end, presaging those contemporary ecologists who advocate the understanding of the interface between ecology and agriculture. Indeed, Howard is grouped, along with Rudolf Steiner, Sir Robert McCarrison, and Richard St. Barbe Baker, as one of the key progenitors of the Western organic agriculture movement. (However, he says, in the Preface to An Agricultural Testament, "Some attention has also been paid to the Bio-Dynamic methods of agriculture in Holland and in Great Britain, but I remain unconvinced that the disciples of Rudolf Steiner can offer any real explanation of natural laws or have yet provided any practical examples that demonstrate the value of their theories.")

== Publications ==
The following is a selection of publications by Albert Howard, including his better-known works, and some lesser-known publications. His knighthood was conferred in 1934, so in publications prior to that, he is not referred to as "Sir." Even subsequent to that, he did not always refer to himself as "Sir," as per his contribution to Nature in 1936 and his correspondence to the British Medical Journal in 1939. In the listings below, from 1945 onwards, he is cited as "Sir Albert Howard"; hence, his authorship is not duplicated thereafter.

- Howard, Albert; Howard, Gabrielle L.C. (1907), "Note on Immune Wheats", The Journal of Agricultural Science, 2 (3): 278–280, doi:10.1017/S0021859600000575, S2CID 84326599
- Howard, Albert; Howard, Gabrielle L.C.; Khan, Abdur Rahman (1910), The economic significance of natural cross-fertilization in India, India Dept. of Agriculture. Memoirs. Botanical series, vol. III, (No.6) Calcutta: Thacker, Spink & Co.; London: W. Thacker & Co. (Published for the Imperial Department of Agriculture in India; Calcutta). Listing at Open Library
- Howard, Albert (February 1921), "The Influence of Soil Factors on Disease Resistance", Annals of Applied Biology, 7 (4): 373–389, doi:10.1111/j.1744-7348.1921.tb05525.x
- Howard, Albert (1 January 1925), "The Effect of Grass on Trees", Proceedings of the Royal Society B, 97 (683): 284–321, Bibcode:1925RSPSB..97..284H, doi:10.1098/rspb.1925.0003, JSTOR 81054
- Howard, Albert; Howard, Gabrielle L.C. (1929), "The Development of Indian Agriculture", Nature, India of Today, VIII (3053) (2nd ed.), London: Humphrey Milford and Oxford University Press: 698, Bibcode:1928Natur.121..698C, doi:10.1038/121698a0, S2CID 44552204
- Howard, Albert; Wad, Yeshwant D (1931), The Waste Products of Agriculture: Their Utilization as Humus, Oxford: Humphrey Milford & Oxford University Press^{[a]}
- Howard, Albert (29 February 1936), "Manufacture of Humus by the Indore Process", Nature, 137 (3461): 363, Bibcode:1936Natur.137..363H, doi:10.1038/137363b0, S2CID 4097403
- Greenwell, Bernard; Howard, Albert; Wrench, G.T. (February 1939), "Address to a Meeting of the Farmers' Club", Journal of the Farmers' Club, Discussion held at the Royal Empire Society, Craven Street, W.C.2, on Monday 30 January 1939 (Part 1)
- Howard, Albert (27 May 1939), "Medical "Testament" on Nutrition (correspondence concerning the Cheshire Medical Testament on Nutrition)", British Medical Journal, 1 (4090): 1106, doi:10.1136/bmj.1.4090.1106, PMC 2209719 (Registration to view BMJ articles is free).
- Howard, Albert (29 July 1939), ""Medical Testament" on Nutrition (correspondence)", British Medical Journal, 2 (4099): 251, doi:10.1136/bmj.2.4099.251, PMC 2209719
- Howard, Albert (1943), "An Agricultural Testament" (PDF), Nature, 147 (3733), Oxford, UK: Oxford University Press: 590–591, Bibcode:1941Natur.147..590W, doi:10.1038/147590a0, S2CID 4100495, archived (PDF) from the original on 2 July 2010 pdf per Special Rodale Press Edition, 1976.
- Howard, Albert; Howard, Louise E (1945), Farming and Gardening for Health or Disease, (Subsequently published as The Soil and Health), London: Faber and Faber Ltd
- Howard, Albert (1945), "Introduction (Howard on earthworms)", The Formation of Vegetable Mould through the Action of Worms with Observation on their Habits, London: Faber & Faber (Howard's introduction to the 1945 publication of Charles Darwin's book, first published in 1881).
- "Harnessing the Earthworm", Organic Gardening, 10 (4), March 1947
- "Organic Campaign", Organic Gardening, 10 (5), April 1947
- "The Animal As Our Farming Partner", Organic Gardening, 11 (3), September 1947
- "How to Avoid a Famine of Quality", Organic Gardening, 11 (5), November 1947
- The Soil and Health: A Study of Organic Agriculture, University Press of Kentucky, 2006 [1947], ISBN 978-0-8131-9171-3 (Originally published by Faber & Faber in 1945 as Farming and Gardening for Health or Disease)

== See also ==
- Biodynamic agriculture
- Compost
- List of sustainable agriculture topics
- Organic farming

== Explanatory notes ==
a. The online reproduction of Howard's 1931 work refers to him as "Sir Albert Howard". However, this is an error. He was not knighted until 1934, and would not have been referred to as Sir. The error is an artifact of the manner in which Howard's name has passed into contemporary public knowledge, via his two most famous books An Agricultural Testament (first published 1940), and Soil and Health (first published 1945 under a different title, but known mostly by this 1947 title), by which time he was referred to as "Sir". Indeed, prior to the advent of the internet and the related information explosion, these were the only two works popularly known by all but the most dedicated researchers, with even less known about his life history, beyond brief synopses associated with the books, and replicated in various book descriptions.

== General and cited references ==
- Barton, Gregory (2001), "Sir Albert Howard and the Forestry Roots of the Organic Farming Movement", Agricultural History, 75 (2): 168–187, doi:10.1525/ah.2001.75.2.168, JSTOR 3744748, PMID 18153970
- Medical Testament: Nutrition, Soil Fertility, and the National Health, County Palatine of Chester: Local Medical and Panel Committee, 22 March 1939 (The subject of two letters by Sir Albert Howard to the British Medical Journal – see 'Publications' section).
- Heckman, J (2006), "A history of organic farming: Transitions from Sir Albert Howard's War in the Soil to USDA National Organic Program", Renewable Agriculture and Food Systems, 21 (3): 143–150, doi:10.1079/RAF2005126, S2CID 154599842
- William Lockeretz, ed. (2007), Organic Farming: An International History, Oxfordshire, UK & Cambridge, Massachusetts: CAB International (CABI), ISBN 978-0-85199-833-6 ebook ISBN 978-1-84593-289-3
- Howard, Louise E (1953), Sir Albert Howard in India, London: Faber & Faber pdf version
- Rodale, J.J. (December 1947), "Sir Albert Howard: In Memoriam", Organic Gardening, 2 (6)
- "Sir Albert Howard Memorial Issue", Organic Gardening Magazine, 13 (8), September 1948 (Contains tributes to Sir Albert Howard).
