= Garden Organic =

UK charity dedicated to organic gardening, farming and food

Coordinates: 52.0226°N 0.2162°E

Headquarters in Ryton, Warwickshire

Garden Organic, formerly known as the Henry Doubleday Research Association (HDRA), is a British organic growing charity dedicated to researching and promoting organic gardening, farming and food. The charity maintains the Heritage Seed Library to preserve vegetable seeds from heritage cultivars and make them available to growers. It is based on a garden site in Ryton-on-Dunsmore, Warwickshire, UK, where it operates demonstration gardens.

== History ==
View of gardens in winter

The Henry Doubleday Research Association was founded in 1954 to research and promote organic gardening, farming, and food. The charity adopted the working name "Garden Organic" in 2005; "Henry Doubleday Research Association" remains the legal name under which it is registered as a charity. Its ground demonstrate organic lawn management.

It was founded by horticulturist and freelance journalist Lawrence D. Hills and named after Henry Doubleday, an Essex-based Quaker smallholder who had a particular interest in the properties of comfrey. The organisation was first based at Bocking near Braintree in Essex, hence the name of Bocking 14, a variety of comfrey bred by Hills for its useful properties. A sister organisation was also formed in Australia, the Henry Doubleday Research Association of Australia Inc.

Jackie and Alan Gear took over management of the charity in 1976, and in 1985 the organisation relocated to its present 22-acre (89,000 m^{2}) headquarters site, Ryton Organic Gardens, at Ryton-on-Dunsmore near Coventry. The Gears retired in 2004, when Dr. Susan Kay-Williams became the chief executive and the charity changed its working name to Garden Organic. Kay-Williams left in the summer of 2007 and the charity appointed Myles Bremner, former director of fundraising at children's charity NCH. Bremner left in the summer of 2013 and was replaced by James Campbell, former acting chief development officer of the Earthwatch Institute.

In the autumn of 2017 Garden Organic announced that it was considering options for the future of its Ryton site, with full or partial sale among the possibilities. Some members expressed concern over the way the charity was handling the issue. In September 2019, Coventry University, whose Centre for Agroecology, Water and Resilience is located on the Ryton site, purchased it. Garden Organic will remain at Ryton Gardens as a tenant.

== Services ==
The organisation has over 20,000 members. It has trained over 600 Master Composter volunteers from around the UK to spread the home composting message and runs research and international development programmes that help commercial growers across the UK and overseas adopt organic methods.

In 2010 with funding from the Big Lottery Fund's Local Food Scheme, Sheepdrove Trust and local authorities in four areas—Warwickshire, North London, South London and Norfolk—the Charity set up a Master Gardener Programme. The Charity's Master Gardeners Programme trains and supports mentors and community growing initiatives around the Country working with Local Authorities, Housing Associations and NHS Health providers to support networks of Master Gardeners and volunteers. The Programme has expanded to other areas in the UK and is currently working with G4S in supporting a Master Gardener Programme for offenders in prisons HMP Rye Hill and Onsley.

It used to actively campaign on issues vital to both people and the environment including health, sustainability, and climate change, and helps children in over 15% of the UK's schools learn about food and organic growing through its free education programme, Garden Organic for Schools and through its work on the Food for Life Partnership.

== Facilities ==
Information board for the Organic Kitchen Garden, Audley End

The charity's headquarters are at the Ryton Organic Gardens site in Warwickshire. Here the organisation not only leads its charitable delivery activities, but also runs over 30 individual gardens in 10 acres (40,000 m^{2}) of landscaped grounds open to the public. The site is also home to The Organic Way, extensive conference and educational facilities, a vegetarian/vegan restaurant, a small shop with organic seeds and the charity's Heritage Seed Library, which conserves over 800 endangered varieties of rare vegetable seeds under threat from extinction.

As well as Ryton Gardens, the charity has run the walled kitchen gardens at Audley End, Essex, in association with English Heritage. Audley End is a Jacobean stately home owned by English Heritage and in 1999 Garden Organic restored its walled kitchen garden using organic methods. The Gardens continue to be managed by English Heritage under the guidance of Garden Organic.

A demonstration garden in Yalding, Kent, showing organic growing techniques in fourteen individual gardens was closed in 2007 after 12 years' development because of financial unviability. The site then came under a sequence of several owners and since 2016 has become a venue for weddings and other events.

== Financing and membership ==
The charity relies on funds from its supporters and members to carry out its work and, in return, offers a six-monthly magazine, members-only web pages and information sheets, as well as access to the charity's team of advisors who answer more than 5,000 organic gardening queries every year. In addition, members gain unlimited free admission to the two demonstration gardens together with the Royal Horticultural Society gardens at Wisley, Harlow Carr, Rosemoor and Hyde Hall, plus over 20 other gardens across the UK.

King Charles III became Garden Organic's patron in 1989. The organisation's President is Professor Tim Lang and Vice Presidents are Raymond Blanc, Thelma Barlow and Susan Hampshire. The charity reaches more than three million beneficiaries across the world.
