= Henry Doubleday (horticulturalist) =

English plant scientist (1810–1902)

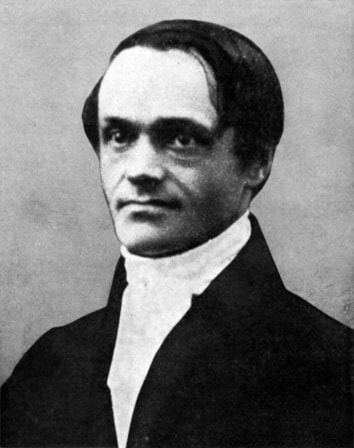
Portrait from 1851

Henry Doubleday (1810–1902) was an English scientist and horticulturist of Coggeshall in Essex. He was a manufacturer of gum arabic and gelatin, and developed strains of potato and comfrey. The Henry Doubleday Research Association is named after him.

== Life and works ==
He was the son of William Doubleday and his wife Hannah Corder. His father was a shopkeeper in Coggeshall; the family were all Quakers. He lived at the same time as his cousin Henry Doubleday (1808–1875), the entomologist and ornithologist.

Doubleday had a wide range of interests; he produced an early observational beehive, and in 1851, he won a bronze medal for lace designs made in Coggeshall and shown at the Great Exhibition. He gained the contract with De La Rue for the supply of gum arabic for postage stamps. Gum arabic is made from imported extracts from the acacia tree. In his efforts to find a suitable material which could be grown in England he experimented with imported varieties of comfrey, though the gum produced proved to be unsuitable. He developed a type of gum that was able to stay on the back of stamps until wetted. Doubleday also manufactured gelatin, and tried to develop a blight-resistant potato. Doubleday was associated with botanist Thomas Christy (1831–1905), who led the marketing of the comfrey strains developed by Doubleday.

The value of his work was recognised and he was elected a member of the Royal Horticultural Society. However, his membership was never registered as he was unable to afford the fee. The full extent of his work may never be known, as his notes were burnt by his family after his death at the age of 92 in Coggeshall.

The work was also recognised by Lawrence D Hills, a horticulturalist who named the Henry Doubleday Research Association (HDRA) after him. The HDRA, now called Garden Organic, has since become the largest organic gardening and horticultural organisation in Europe.
