= An Agricultural Testament =

1940 book by Sir Albert Howard

- Title page for An Agricultural Testament (1943)
- Author: Sir Albert Howard
- Language: English
- Subject: Agriculture
- Published: 1940
- Publication place: England

An Agricultural Testament is Sir Albert Howard's best-known publication, and remains one of the seminal works in the history of organic farming agricultural movement. Dedicated to his first wife and co-worker Gabrielle, herself a plant physiologist, it focuses on the nature and management of soil fertility, and notably explores composting. At a time when modern, chemical-based industrialized agriculture was just beginning to radically alter food production, it advocated natural processes rather than man-made inputs as the superior approach to farming. It was first published in England in 1940, with the first American edition in 1943. (Note: The online version of An Agricultural Testament states that the first American edition was 1945. This is an error. The hardcopy of the 1976 Special Rodale Press Edition clearly states: "First American edition, 1943". The online text otherwise appears to be identical with the hardcopy, including the replication of the comments from the inside flaps and back of the dust-cover.)
