= Florida Certified Organic Growers =

American farm organization

Florida Organic Growers
- Formation: 1989
- Type: Non-Profit Organization
- Headquarters: Gainesville, Florida
- Field: Organic Agriculture
- Website: foginfo.org

Florida Certified Organic Growers and Consumers, also known as Florida Organic Growers or FOG, is a non-profit organization founded in 1987. It is classified as a 501(c) corporation. One of the main facets of FOG is Quality Certification Services, a program that extends through 30 states and 14 countries. FOG is also concerned with community outreach and education in order to promote healthy organic lifestyles and social equity.

== History ==
Headquartered in Gainesville, Florida, FOG began as community farmers joining together to promote and ensure quality organic food and farming practices.

In response to the Florida Organic Farming and Food Law of 1990 and the Organic Foods Production Act of 1990, FOG began a quality certification program in order to protect consumers and enforce consistent organic standards. In 2001, FOG received their USDA accreditation, allowing it to certify organic farms. FOG also become involved in policy creation and promotion, including the National Organic Program and Farm Bill.

More recently, FOG has expanded its interests to include teaching and research projects oriented towards sharing knowledge and resources to create a healthy and just food system. These projects span from involvement in local farmers' markets to the implementation of organic community and personal gardens in low-income areas.

== Quality Certification Services ==
Florida Organic Growers adopted the name Quality Certification Services (QCS) for its organic certification initiative in 1996 to reflect its widespread clientele. QCS is aimed towards economizing organic certification and fostering diversity, as shown by its 400 member farms.

As of 2001, FOG's Quality Certification Services can USDA certify farming, wildcrafting, livestock, processing, packing and handling operations. These products can be deemed as Certified Organic, Certified Transitional, Certified Hormone, Antibiotic Free, or Organic Aquaculture. These categories help farmers differentiate their products and allow consumers to make informed purchases.

== Education and Outreach ==
=== Farmers Markets/EBT ===
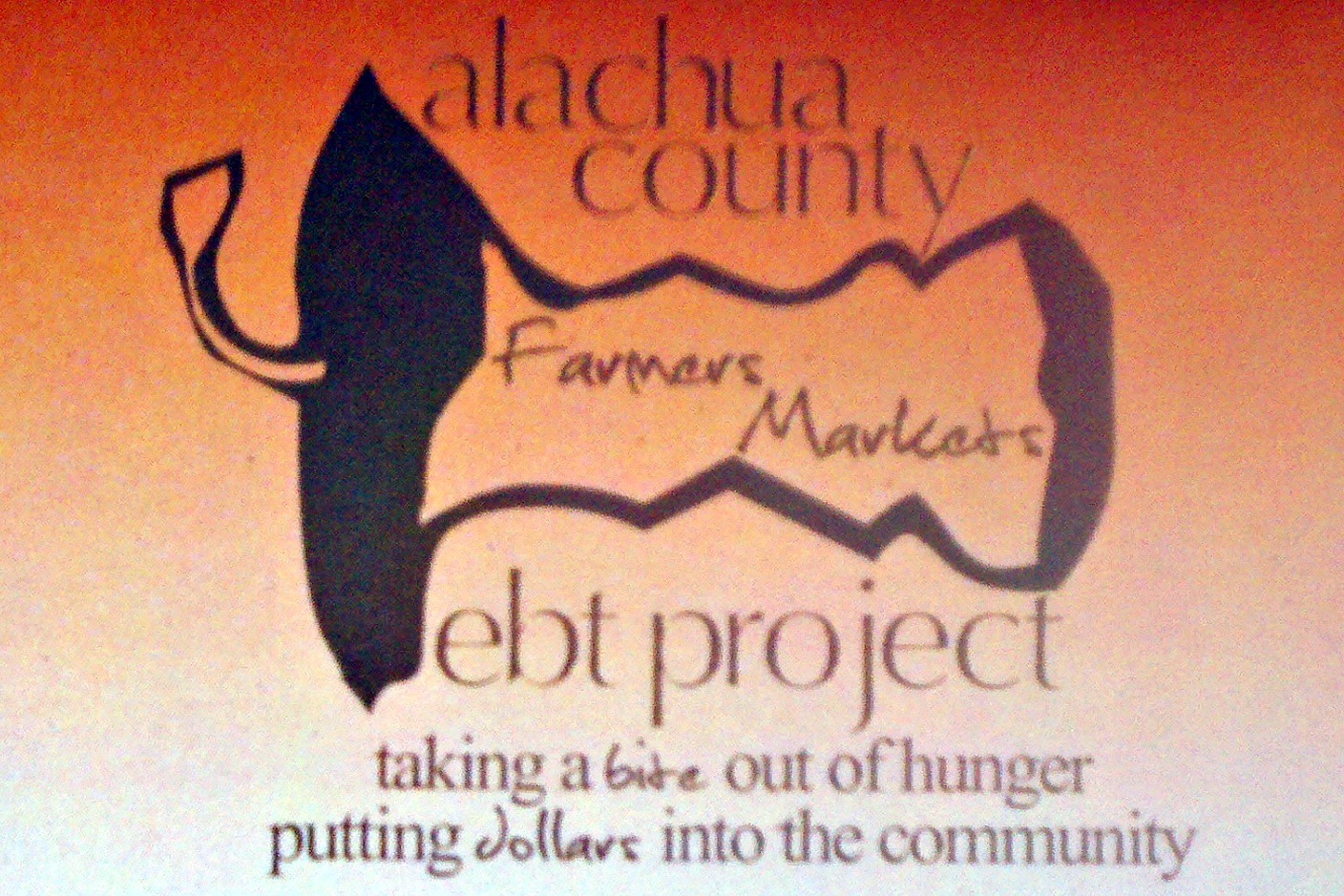
EBT Project

In late 2010, FOG launched its Alachua County Farmers Markets EBT Project. EBT, or Electronic Benefit Transfer, cards are given by the government to members of the federal Supplemental Nutrition Assistance Program for the purpose of purchasing food and non-alcoholic beverages. Before the launch of FOG's EBT Project, there were not many places in Alachua county for people with these federal food benefits to purchase groceries besides standard supermarkets. FOG wanted to implement a method for those with food assistance to purchase fresh, local merchandise at Alachua county farmers' markets. As a result of FOG's EBT program, EBT cards can now be swiped at a FOG vendor booth stationed at various farmers markets for tokens that can be used within the market to purchase meat, produce, and edible plants. This project makes products at the farmers markets available to members of the food assistance program, offering these people more nutritious food options. In addition, the EBT project boosts the local economy by supporting Gainesville farmers and promotes local sustainable agriculture. The FOG booth is also an educational hub, offering resources on gardening, cooking, community events, and more.

From February 2011 through September 2011, the FOG EBT Project offered double value coupons to those using their EBT cards at the Gainesville farmers markets, giving users $2 for every $1 swiped from their card. The funding for this aspect of the project was provided mostly by Alachua county. The double value promotion substantially increased awareness of the program and brought even more money into the local agriculture community.

=== Gift Gardens ===
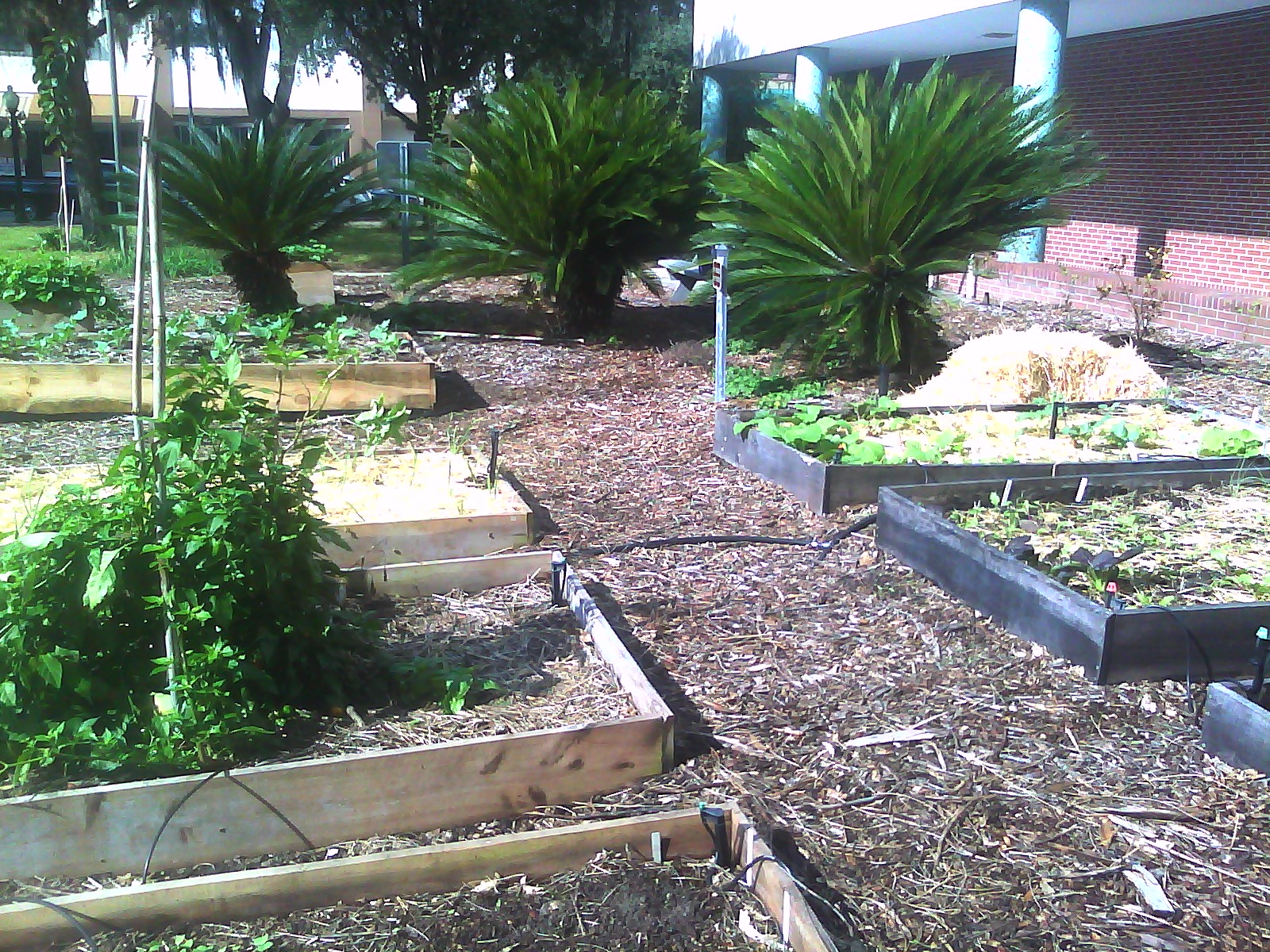
Downtown Farmer's Garden

A project of FOG's main outpost in Alachua County, Florida is the GIFT Gardens. GIFT Gardens—Gainesville's Initiative For Tasty Gardens—have two facets. One entails providing low-income county residents with up to three vegetable garden beds and ample tools and information to maintain them. Allowing families the means to become more self-sufficient and supplement their food supplies upholds FOG's effort towards social justice, as inequity often parallels nutritional disparities. They also provide these services to community centers, such as churches, schools and recreation areas, which can receive up to ten garden beds. There are now over 200 GIFT gardens in Alachua County, all providing nutritious food, education and physical exercise for a healthier community. These gardens are funded by Alachua County and the City of Gainesville, although to supplement FOG offers 1-4-1 gardens, where people purchase personal gardens and the money is used to provide low income areas with a free GIFT garden.

The other component of the GIFT gardens are the community gardens maintained by volunteers. These include the Downtown Farmers Garden, installed in July 2010, and the recent addition of the City Hall garden in May 2011. These gardens provide educational opportunities, and their harvests are donated to local charities and homeless shelters.

=== Grow Gainesville ===
In collaboration with Slow Food Gainesville, Abundant Edible Landscapes, the Edible Plant Project, Santa Fe College and The University of Florida, FOG is seeking an "urban gardening network," in which they supply the means and information for people to grow food for themselves, while enhancing the aesthetics of the city.

Grow Gainesville is a membership based organization, whose annual dues fund the operation of an urban garden network. The membership allows access to seeds, equipment and discounts on plants and supplemental materials.

=== Neighborhood Nutrition Network ===
The Neighborhood Nutrition Network is a nationally acknowledged food program that created gardens with student participation at three low income schools. The harvests were divided among their cafeterias and the students' families, amounting to over 4,000 pounds.

The project was supported by the USDA Community Food Project grant, awarded in 2000 and 2003. The latter grant allowed the formation and proliferation of the Youth Entrepreneurial Farm and Food Preservation Project, employing at risk high school students at a local farm, giving them the experience to establish their own businesses.

=== Outreach ===
FOG also created the Organic Transition Project, an initiative that gives free technical aid to farmers dedicated to switching to organic production. Workshops provide farmers with information on organic farming practices, federal regulation, and farm development. FOG also discusses financial incentives offered to transitioning farmers, as included in the 2008 Farm Bill.

=== Social Justice ===
Since 1999, FOG has worked on the Agricultural Justice Project (AJP) to create a "socially just" food label. Such a certification reflects fair working conditions and economic equity, often ignored by standard organic labels. These labels are awarded to business that exemplify an open relationship between producer and consumer, while maintaining environmental and social integrity. To promote the project, FOG administers technical assistance and certification to qualifying farms and gives training to other certifiers, enabling them to verify deserving businesses.

FOG also contributed to the formation of the Domestic Fair Trade Association, oriented towards "health, justice and sustainability." They promote family-scale farming, direct trade, stable pricing, empowerment and transparency, achieved through education and assistance. They recognize that a method for evaluating the social and environmental implications of a business must be devised, and are working towards a sufficient criterion.

=== Research ===
FOG's main research was a 2009 to 2011 project entitled "Organic Perspectives: Understanding the Views of Florida Consumers, Specialty Crop Farmers and Retailers." The report aimed at unveiling the most pervasive market influences on organic production as opposed to conventional methods, emphasizing attitudes and the consumer component. The research was funded by a grant through the Florida Department of Agriculture and Consumer Services.
