= The Living Soil =

1943 book by Lady Eve Balfour

- Author: Lady Eve Balfour
- Genre: Non-fiction
- Publisher: Faber & Faber
- Publication date: 1943

The Living Soil (1943) by Lady Eve Balfour is considered a seminal classic in organic agriculture and the organic movement. The book is based on the initial findings of the first three years of the Haughley Experiment, the first formal, side-by-side farm trial to compare organic and chemical-based farming, started in 1939 by Balfour (with Alice Debenham), on two adjoining farms in Haughley Green, Suffolk, England.

The Living Soil was also published as The Living Soil and the Haughley Experiment.
