= Lady Eve Balfour =

British organic farmer (1898–1990)

- Balfour in 1943
- Born: Evelyn Barbara Balfour; 16 July 1898; Holland Park
- Died: 16 January 1990 (aged 91)
- Parent(s): Gerald Balfour, 2nd Earl of Balfour; Lady Betty Balfour

Lady Evelyn Barbara Balfour, OBE (16 July 1898 – 16 January 1990) was a British farmer, educator, organic farming pioneer, and a founding figure in the organic movement. She was one of the first women to study agriculture at an English university, graduating from the institution now known as the University of Reading.

== Biography ==
Balfour was born in Holland Park, London, one of the six children of Gerald, 2nd Earl of Balfour, and Lady Elizabeth Bulwer-Lytton, daughter of the 1st Earl of Lytton (former Viceroy of India). She was the niece of former prime minister Arthur J. Balfour. She decided at the age of 12 that she wanted to be a farmer. At the age of 17, she enrolled, as one of the first women students to do so, at Reading University College for the Diploma of Agriculture. After obtaining her Diploma in 1917, she completed a year's practical farming, living in 'digs' at 102 Basingstoke Road, Reading. During this time she worked at Manor Farm ploughing fields. She was subsequently appointed bailiff to a farm near Newport, Wales, under the direction of various war committees, notably the Monmouthshire Women's War Agricultural Committee whose Chairwoman was Lady Mather Jackson of Llantilio Court, Abergavenny.

In 1919, at the age of 21, at the suggestion of family friend William E.G. Palmer of Haughley, she and her sister Mary bought New Bells Farm in Haughley Green, Suffolk, using inheritance monies put into a trust by their father. In 1939, she launched the Haughley Experiment, the first long-term, side-by-side scientific comparison of organic and chemical-based farming. She later became Chairperson of Haughley Parish Council for many years and organised Air Raid Precautions in the village. She campaigned vigorously against the payment of tithes to the church and was in opposition to the Vicar of Haughley, the Rev Walter Grainge White.

In 1943, leading London publishing house Faber & Faber published Balfour's book The Living Soil. Reprinted numerous times, it became a founding text of the emerging organic food and farming movement. The book synthesised existing arguments in favour of organics with a description of her plans for the Haughley Experiment.

== Soil Association ==
In 1946, Balfour co-founded and became the first president of the Soil Association, an international organisation which promotes sustainable agriculture, and became one of the UK's main organic farming advocates. Through the introduction of the Agriculture Act 1947, the UK established its commitment towards a highly mechanised, intensive farming system, which disappointed Balfour, as it refused to offer support or funding towards organic production methods. By 1952, the Soil Association saw its membership increase to 3,000, largely owing to the dedication of a small committee, including Balfour and the publication of their journal Mother Earth, later renamed Living Earth.

In South Africa, experiments were undertaken by the Valley Trust. using Balfour's methods in 1961 and 1962. These subsequently demonstrated that the organic approach was all that was necessary, indeed, that "the people did not need chemicals, which were worse than useless on the dry soil."

== Personal life ==
Balfour lived with Kathleen Carnley (1889–1976) for 50 years. Carnley joined Balfour at Haughley during the 1930s and was a skilful dairy worker. After the large farmhouse was rented out, they lived in a cottage at Haughley. Before Carnley, historians speculated about her relationship with Beryl Hearnden (1897–1978). Balfour and Carnley became friendly with Graham White and stayed with him at Bald Blair when touring Australia and New Zealand.

== Later life ==
Balfour continued to farm, write and lecture for the rest of her life. A statement that "Health can be as infectious as disease, growing and spreading under the right conditions" is attributed to her. In 1958, she embarked on a year-long tour of Australia and New Zealand, during which she met Australian organic farming pioneers, including Henry Shoobridge, president of the Living Soil Association of Tasmania, the first organisation to affiliate with the Soil Association.

She moved to the Suffolk coast in 1963 and made regular visits back to the farm at Haughley. The farm was sold in 1970, owing to mounting debts incurred by the centre. In 1984, she retired from the Soil Association aged 85. She continued to cultivate her large garden. On 30 December 1989, she was appointed OBE in the 1990 New Year Honours list. In 1989, she had suffered a stroke from which she died in Scotland, aged 91, on 16 January 1990.

On 17 January 1990, the day after her death, the Conservative Government, under Margaret Thatcher, offered grants to encourage British farmers to change to organic methods.

== Publications ==
- The Living Soil (1943)
- Common Sense Compost Making (1973) a revision by Eve Balfour of Maye E Bruce's work
- The Living Soil and the Haughley Experiment (1975)
- Towards a Sustainable Agriculture the Living Soil (1982)

She wrote, with Beryl Hearnden, several detective novels under the pseudonym Hearnden Balfour:

- The Paper Chase (Hodder & Stoughton 1927) (as A Gentleman from Texas Houghton, Mifflin 1927)(as La Chasse au Papier Librairie des Champs-Elysées by Hearnden et Balfour 1928)
- The Enterprising Burglar (Hodder & Stoughton 1928) (Houghton, Mifflin 1928) (as Der vermißte Millionär Georg Müller 1928)
- Anything Might Happen (Hodder & Stoughton 1933) (as Murder and the Red-Haired Girl Houghton, Mifflin 1933) (as Rien n'est Impossible Librairie des Champs-Elysees 1937)
