= Soil Association =

British registered charity

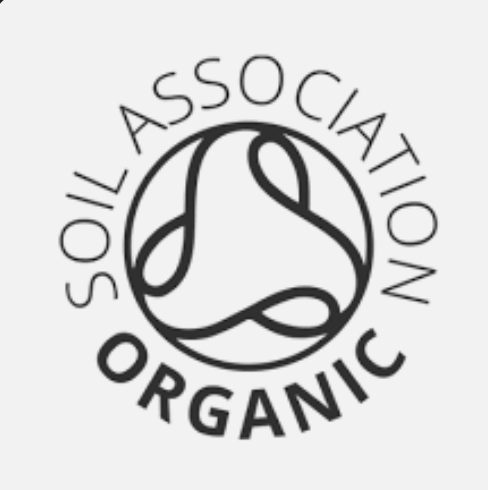
- Founded: 1946
- Founder: Lady Eve Balfour; Jorian Jenks; Friend Sykes
- Type: Charity, lobby association
- Legal status: Registered charity 206862 (England and Wales); Charity SC039168 (Scotland)
- Purpose: Organic movement
- Location: Spear House, 51 Victoria Street, Bristol BS1 6AD
- Region served: United Kingdom
- Method: Campaigning and certification
- Key people: Martin Nye, chair of trustees; Helen Browning, chief executive
- Website: soilassociation.org

The Soil Association is a British registered charity focused on the effect of agriculture on the environment, established in 1946. Their activities include campaigning for local purchasing, public education on nutrition and certification of organic foods, and against intensive farming.

== History ==
=== The Haughley experiment ===
Lady Eve Balfour (niece of former British Prime Minister Arthur Balfour) was one of the first women to study agriculture in a British university. She and her sister Mary bought New Bells Farm at Haughley Green in Suffolk and started the Haughley Experiment, trialling different types of farming techniques to compare chemical and organic farming.

The Haughley experiment was the first formal, side-by-side farm trial to compare organic and chemical-based farming. It was based on an idea that farmers were over-reliant on fertilizers, that livestock, crops and the soil should be treated as a whole system and that "natural" farming produced food which was in some way more wholesome than food produced with more intensive methods. Lady Balfour believed that humanity's future and human health were dependent on how the soil was treated, and ran the experiment to generate scientific data that would support these beliefs.

Lady Balfour published results in her 1943 book The Living Soil. Reprinted numerous times, it became a founding text of the emerging organic food and farming movement and of the Soil Association.

=== Founders' meeting ===
Lady Eve Balfour, Friend Sykes and George Scott Williamson organized a founders' meeting for the Soil Association on 12 June 1945 and about a hundred people attended. The association was formally registered on 3 May 1946. It shared an office at Hyde Park Mansions with the Pioneer Health Centre, and also shared the Pioneer office manager Mary Langman and secretary Amy Moor, because Williamson and Innes Pearse were key members of both organisations. In the next decade the Soil Association grew to over 4,000 members.

The Soil Association was also founded in part due to concerns over intensive agriculture and in particular the use of herbicides. British Union of Fascists member Jorian Jenks, who was closely associated with Oswald Mosley, was one of the founders. Following Jenks' death in 1963, the association tilted towards the left of the political spectrum, especially under the new president, Barry Commoner.

The association was one of the five bodies which at Versailles in 1972 formed the International Federation of Organic Agriculture Movements to act as the umbrella organisation to advocate for organic farming.

== Campaigns ==
Past campaigns by the association include the following areas:

- intensive pesticide use
- neonicotinoid pesticides
- deregulation of genome editing
- megafarming
- agroecology
- welfare of farm animals
- ultra-processed foods
- healthy school meals
- labelling of beauty products

The association takes part in industry and trade events, as well as offering training days.

== Twenty-first century ==
Campaigner Alastair Sawday was vice-chairman of the association between 2005 and 2007.

As of 2023, Wiltshire farmer Helen Browning is the chief executive; broadcaster Monty Don was president from 2008 to 2016. Honorary vice-presidents include Jonathan Dimbleby, George McRobie, and Charlotte Mitchell. King Charles III is a royal patron.

== Certification ==
The association certifies organic products in farming, food processing, restaurants and catering, fisheries, textiles and leather, and health and beauty products. Its subsidiary Soil Association Certification Ltd is approved by the Department for Environment, Food and Rural Affairs. It sets standards for packaging, animal welfare, wildlife conservation, residues and food additives. Since 2008 its standards have excluded nanomaterials.

== See also ==
- Rolf Gardiner – English rural revivalist
- Claire Loewenfeld – British garden writer (1899–1974)
- H. J. Massingham – British writer (1888–1952)
- Innes Hope Pearse – English medical practitioner and biologist, founder member
- Craig Sams – UK-based businessman and author (born 1944)
- E. F. Schumacher – German-born British statistician and economist (1911–1977)
- Tracy Worcester – British environmental activist and actress
- Lizzie Vann – Children's food company
- Living Soil Association of Tasmania
- Australian Organic Farming and Gardening Society
