= Haughley Experiment =

1939 comparison of organic and conventional farming

The Haughley Experiment was the first comparison of organic farming and conventional farming, started in 1939 by Lady Eve Balfour and Alice Debenham, on two adjoining farms in Haughley Green, Suffolk, England. It was based on an idea that farmers were over-reliant on fertilizers, that livestock, crops and the soil should be treated as a whole system, and that "natural" farming produced food which was in some way more wholesome than food produced with more intensive methods. Lady Balfour believed that mankind's future and human health were dependent on how the soil was treated, and ran the experiment to generate scientific data that would support these beliefs.

Deborah Stinner, an entomologist, has written that by modern standards the Haughley experiment was more of a "demonstration" than a true experiment because it lacked methodological rigour, and it is thus not possible to draw any firm conclusions from its outputs.

Findings reported by the Haughley experiment included:

1. Levels of available minerals in the soil fluctuate according to the season, maximum levels coinciding with the time of maximum plant demand and these fluctuations were significantly greater in the organic plots.
2. Vegetative mineral levels remained as high or higher in the organic plots even without receiving the mineral inputs that the conventional plots had.
3. Organic fed animals required from 12–15% less input of food, were healthier, and lived longer than their conventional counterparts.
4. Increased yields.

In the early 1980s, just before it ceased operation, properties of the three sections were measured and showed differences in earthworm density, crop root depth, and soil properties including soil carbon, moisture and, surprisingly, temperature.

== See also ==
- History of organic farming
- Long-term experiment
