= List of composting systems =

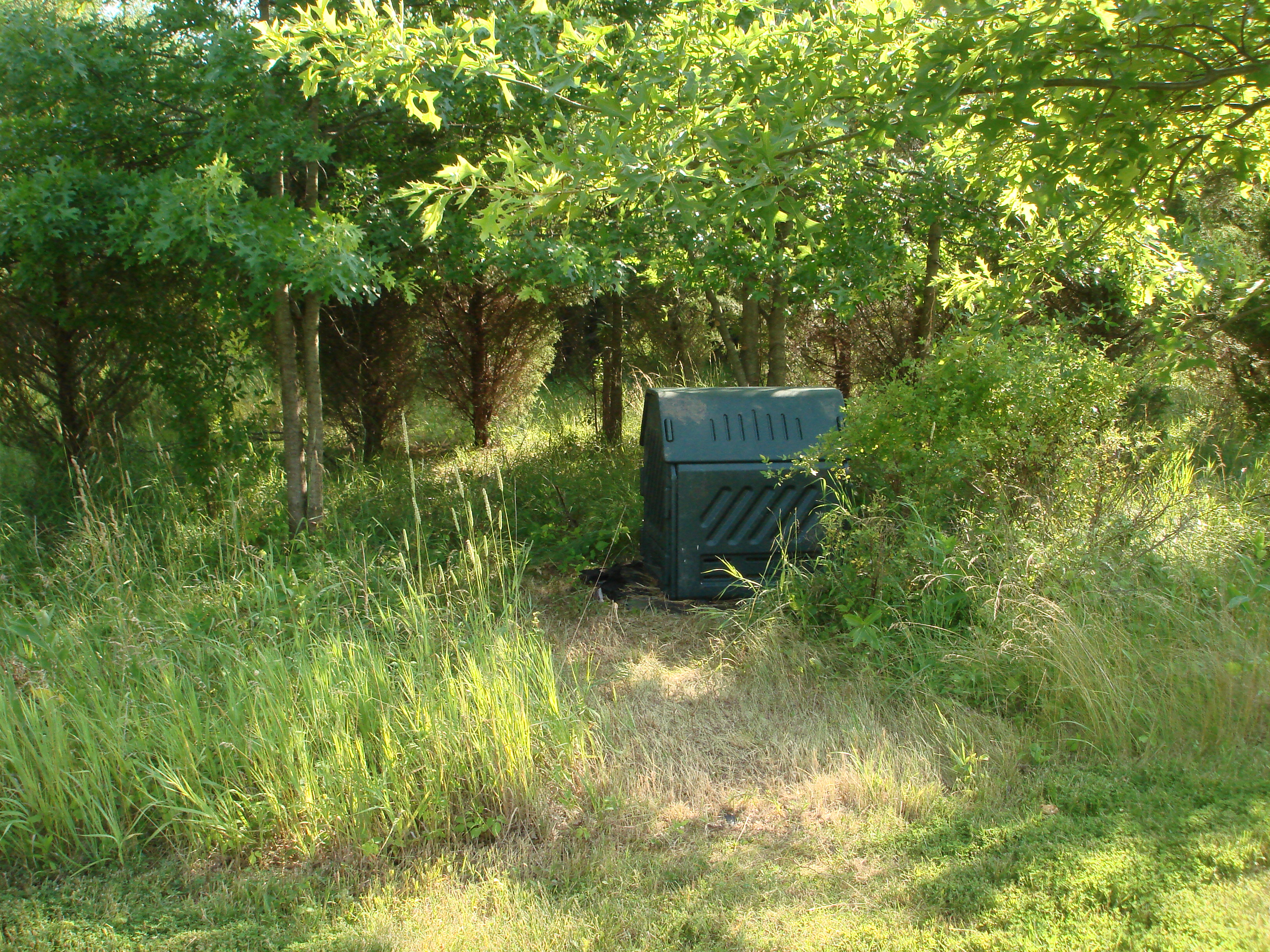
A modern compost bin constructed from plastics

This is a list of composting systems:

== Home composting (small-scale) ==
- Bokashi (horticulture)
- Composting toilet
- Container composting
- Ecuador composting method
- Hot container composting
- Hügelkultur a.k.a. German mound
- Sheet mulching
- Trench composting
- Vermicomposting

== Industrial composting (large-scale) ==
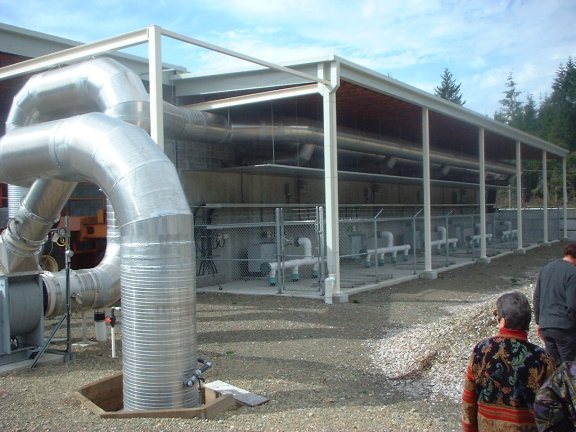
Aeration system for a closed chamber composting facility

- Aerated static pile composting, Tunnel composting
- High fibre composting
- In-vessel composting
- Mechanical biological treatment
- Vermicomposting
- Windrow composting

== See also ==
- Agroecology
- Biodynamic agriculture
- Certified Naturally Grown
- Compost
- Groundcycle
- Intensive farming
- Organic farming by country
- Organic Farming Digest
- Organic food
- Organic movement
- Permaculture
- Plant nutrition
- Seasonal food
- Sustainable agriculture
- San Francisco Mandatory Recycling and Composting Ordinance
- Terra preta
- Urban agriculture
- Waste sorting
- The Society for the Preservation of Wild Culture

=== Related lists ===
- Index of environmental articles
- Outline of organic gardening and farming
- Outline of sustainable agriculture
