= Organic farming by continent =

Organic farming is practiced around the globe, but the markets for sale are strongest in North America and Europe, while the greatest dedicated area is accounted for by Australia, the greatest number of producers are in India, and the Falkland Islands record the highest share of agricultural land dedicated to organic production.

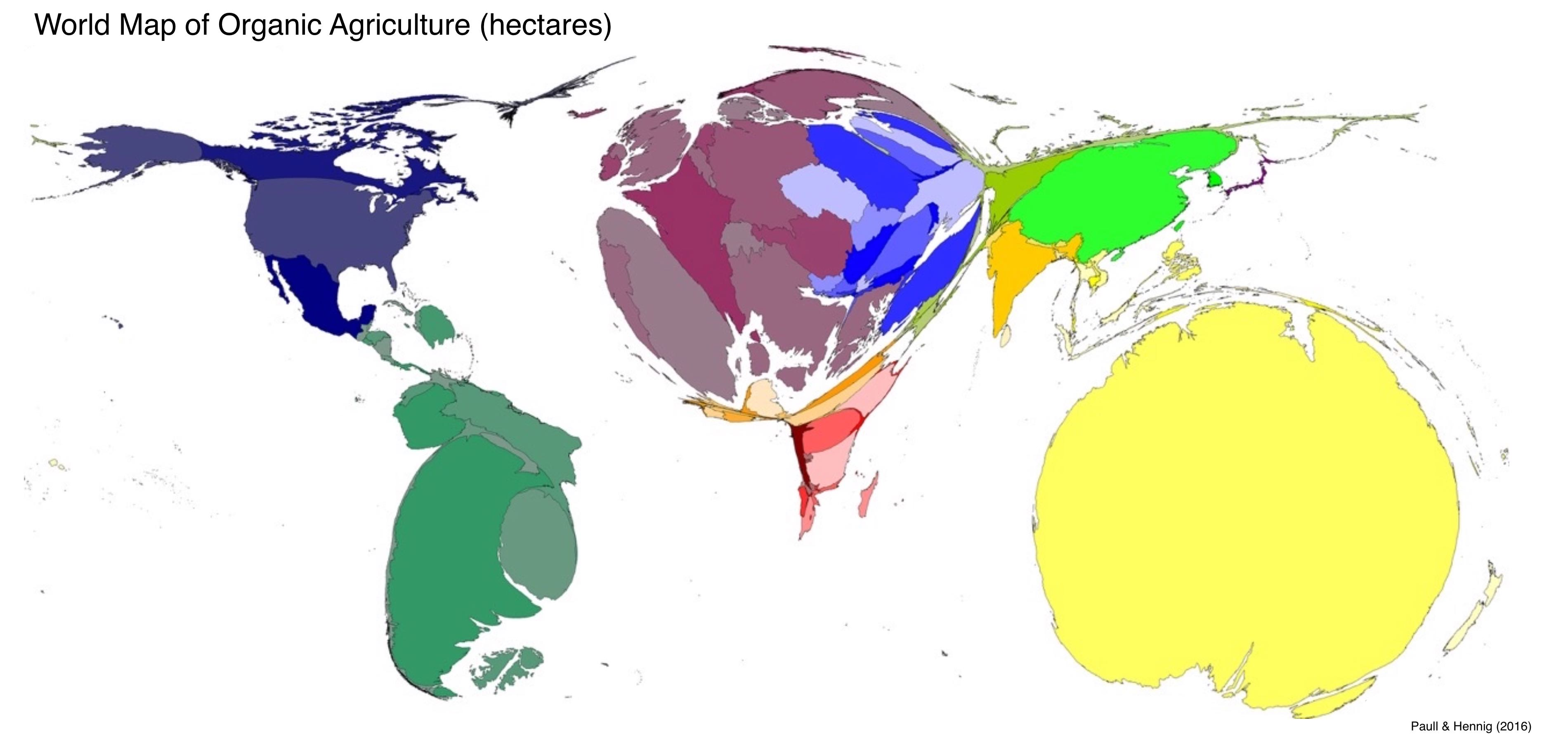
World map of organic agriculture (hectares)

== Organic farming by continent ==
The following information is taken from the 2009 edition of the yearbook "The World of Organic Agriculture", published by the International Federation of Organic Movements IFOAM, the Research Institute of Organic Agriculture FiBL and the International Trade Centre ITC.

According to the latest survey on organic agriculture, carried out by the Research Institute of Organic Agriculture FiBL and the International Federation of Organic Agriculture Movements IFOAM, organic agriculture is developing rapidly, and statistical information is now available from 141 countries of the world. Its share of agricultural land and farms continues to grow in many countries. The main results of the global survey on certified organic farming show that 32.2 million hectares of agricultural land are managed organically by more than 1.2 million producers, including smallholders (2007). In addition to the agricultural land, there are 0.4 million hectares of certified organic aquaculture. Global demand for organic products remains robust, with sales increasing by over five billion US Dollars a year. Organic Monitor estimates international sales to have reached 46.1 billion US Dollars in 2007 (WorldStats2009,FiBL, IFOAM, ITC 2009). Since global statistics have first been collated, Australia has reported more certified organic hectares than any other country. Australia currently accounts for 35 million certified organic hectares which is 54% of the world's certified organic agricultural land and 8.8% of Australia's agricultural land.

=== Africa ===
Africa has 1.3 million hectares of organic agricultural land as of 2014. Even though Africa has the second largest land area of any continent, it has the smallest distribution of organic agricultural land at 3%.

Much of Africa's organic agricultural activity is concentrated in East Africa and less in other countries. Within the continent, however, Uganda has the largest organic area (231,157 hectares) and the largest number of organic producers (189,610). Globally, Uganda has the second largest number of organic producers (190,552) – following India's 650,000. The East African Community (Uganda, Burundi, Kenya, Rwanda and Tanzania) make up 35% of the African organic farming land.

According to the United Nations Conference on Trade and Development, "there is a growing recognition among policymakers that organic agricultural has a significant role to play in addressing food security issues, land degradation impacts, poverty alleviation and climate change in Africa." There is also economic incentive to pursue organic farming in Africa. North America and Europe make up a majority of consumer demand for organic products, with 97 percent of global revenues. The expectation is that African countries can tap into this growing market in industrialized countries through organic exports. Organic agricultural land in Africa has had relatively slow growth and does not have comparable infrastructure to more established organic systems in North America and Europe. Because of this, there is less data and consistent information around the regulation of organic agriculture in Africa. Tanzania offers an example of how organic farming is being managed in one East African country.

Tanzania follows the East African Organic Product Standard, which was adopted by the East African Community in 2007. This is the official standard for organic agriculture production in the region as established by the United Nations Environment Program and the United Nations Conference for Trade and Development. By 2005 Kenya, Uganda and Tanzania had developed different organic standards. The East African Organic Product Standard was an attempt to alleviate challenges around market exclusion because of different criteria for organic products. Some of the standards that have been set include criteria around genetically modified organisms, social justice, crop production, animal husbandry and labelling. They also provide a "List of substances which may be used in organic plant production" and a "List of additives and processing aids for organic food processing."

As of 2000, 45.1% of Tanzania's GDP was generated from agricultural activities and agricultural workers made up 84.4% of the country's total labor force. Even though many small-scale farmers in Tanzania practice traditional farming – where they use not inputs – they are not all certified and can't benefit from the price premiums associated with certified organic products. Of the products that are certified organic, most are exported to international markets. Of the organic producers selling outside of the country, their production includes coffee, cocoa, tea, spices, horticultural produce such as fruits and vegetables, cotton, maize, sesame, banana and cassava. Additionally, even though organic farming is mentioned in the 2006 Livestock Policy and 2013 Agriculture Policy, Tanzania's organic market is not regulated.

=== Asia ===
The total organic area in Asia is nearly 2.9 million hectares. This constitutes nine percent of the world's organic agricultural land. 230’000 producers were reported. The leading countries are China (1.6 million hectares) and India (1 million hectares). The highest shares of organic land of all agricultural land are in Timor Leste (seven percent). Organic wild collection areas play a major role in India and China. Production of final processed products is growing, although a majority of production is still fresh produce and field crops with low value-added processing, such as dry or processed raw ingredients. Aquaculture (shrimp and fish) on the other hand, is emerging in China, Indonesia, Vietnam, Thailand, Malaysia and Myanmar. Textiles is another important trend. Sector growth is now also driven by imports, and local markets have taken off in many of the big cities in the South and Eastern part of region besides Japan, South Korea, Taiwan and Singapore. Kuala Lumpur, Manila, Bangkok, Beijing, Shanghai, Jakarta, Delhi, Bangalore and other cities are increasing internal consumption of organic products. Nine organic regulations are in place. In seven countries work on national standards and regulations is in progress.(FiBL, IFOAM, ITC 2009). Many organic products are imported from Oceania and the North America.

Modern organic agriculture in China began in the 1990s, focusing primarily on exporting to international markets. Historically, China has 4,000 years of traditional sustainable farming methods. Some of these traditional farming methods include crop rotation, composting combined with organic matter recycling and traditional ecological systems, such as mulberry trees utilized with fish ponds to help maintain soil fertility.

The modern Chinese organic system was heavily influenced by the standards, concepts, organization and accreditation developed in Western countries. One of the first certified organic products to come out of China was tea from Lin’an County in Zhejiang Province, which was exported to the Netherland signifying the beginning of organic production in China. Since the 1990s, Chinese organic agriculture has expanded rapidly due to the growing demand of international trade and production in organic foods. As the global organic market expanded, the Chinese State Environmental Protection Administration (SEPA) established the Organic Food Development Center (OFDC) in 1994, to certify organic agriculture based on international standards. In 2001, OFDC was able to institute the first comprehensive standard for certifying organic products in China. However, due to rising demand, SEPA created another agency in 2002, the Certification and Accreditation Administration of China (CAAC) to manage new fields of accreditation. In 2005, CAAC instituted the Chinese National Organic Product Standard, based on international standards that was compatible with American, Japanese and European organic standards, including a national logo for national products. This overlap in competing government agencies is not uncommon in China. Some scholars believe that the Chinese government is using this competition to determine which organic system is most optimal. Presently, OFDC remains the most commonly used certifying agency for most Chinese organic producers, but it ultimately depends on the destination of their products whether to certify with OFCD or CAAC.

China has the 4th largest area for organic agricultural land in the world at 1.9 million hectares. In 2009, there were 4,000 certified organic enterprises in China, primarily focused on exporting to the United States, European Union and Japan. The main products destined for export are beans, rice, tea, mushrooms, vegetables, processed oil and herbs. Beans, at approximately 42 percent of the total export value, is the largest export followed behind by cereals, nuts, vegetables, and tea. In 2009, Chinese organic products were traded to more than 20 different countries. According to the China Organic Food Certification Center (COFCC), exported organic products increased in value in 1995 from $300K USD to US$350 million in 2004, which accounted for 1.7 percent of the total value for Chinese agricultural exports.

Organic agricultural products are produced mainly in three different areas: Northeast China, the coastal areas of Eastern China and Southeast China. The main certified areas in Northeast China include the provinces of Heilongjiang, Jilin, Inner Mongolia, and Liaoning province, which produces cereals, beans, pumpkin and sunflower kernels. In the developed coastal regions, which include Shandong, Jiangsu, Beijing, Shanghai, Zhejiang and Fujiang provinces, the focus is on producing organic vegetables for the Japanese and the internal Chinese market. Southeast China provinces like Zhejiang, Jiangxi and Fujian are the main areas for organic tea production. The processing for these products are mainly located in the highly developed and urban areas of eastern China, such as Beijing, Shanghai, Zhejiang, Shandong and Jiangsu Province.

The domestic organic market was completely non-existent in China at the start of modern organic production, but it has grown steadily since the year 2000. This is partially due to increasing concerns over food safety, which a huge issue among Chinese consumers, as the government estimates 40,000 people are affected by food poisoning in a year. In wealthier urban areas like Hong Kong, where demand for organic food is increasing, consumers are concerned about the fact that China uses 30% of world's nitrogen fertilizer on 10% of world's arable land along with being the largest user of pesticides and fertilizer in the world. The capital city of Beijing is the largest domestic organic market, accounting for approximately 1/3 of total domestic market value. Large urban metropolises like Shanghai, Guangzhou, Nanjing and Shenzhen are also major domestic markets. Domestic organic food are found mainly in supermarkets, specialized stores and home delivery systems, which have gained popularity in recent years. The most common products in these domestic markets are rice, beans, meat, milk, eggs, vegetables, and cooking oil. Within China, organic products are cost significantly more than conventional products, with cereals and meat being three times the price of conventional products. Organic vegetables can be as much as 10 times the price of conventional vegetables.

The Chinese government is experimenting with incentives at the provincial level in order to attract farmers to organic farming. Certain provinces have tried to implement their own large export ventures while other jurisdictions offer incentives, like tax benefits to private operators. However, issues remain that hamper the domestic organic market. The vast distances to viable organic markets in China has a negative effect on the local incentives. For instance, the Southern Chinese province of Yunnan is a highly productive area for agriculture, but the area itself has very little demand for organic products and the long distances to the markets of Beijing and Shanghai limits organic producers in Yunnan from significant expansion. Another issue is that so much of Chinese organic products are being exported, the big supermarket chains don't have the steady supply of high volume products to maintain customer confidence. This makes it difficult for small producers, who can't guarantee consistent volume, to enter the market. For many Chinese consumers, there is a lack of general knowledge about organic foods. According to Shanghai Organics, some consumers still view organic as a foreign idea, separate from food safety issues that garner the most attention. The biggest barrier is still price, which is much higher when compared to conventional products. In America the premium for organic prices are between 9–78% the price of conventional products. In China the premium can be up to 700%, with most demand coming from the wealthier expat communities and the richer urban areas.

=== Europe ===
As in the rest of the world, the organic market in Europe continues to grow and more land is farmed organically each year. "More farmers cultivate organically, more land is certified organic, and more countries report organic farming activities" as per the 2016 edition of the study "The World of Organic Agriculture " according to data from the end of 2014 published by FiBL and IFOAM in 2016.

In 2007, more than 200,000 farms managed 7.8 million hectares in Europe organically. In the European Union, 7.2 million hectares were under organic management, with more than 180,000 organic farms. 1.9 percent of the European agricultural area and four percent of the agricultural area in the European Union is organic. As of 2007, twenty-four percent of the world's organic land was in Europe. The countries with the largest organic area were Italy (1,150,253 hectares), Spain (988,323 hectares) and Germany (865,336 hectares). The highest percentages were in Liechtenstein (29 percent), Austria (13 percent) and Switzerland (11 percent). The amount of hectares managed organically continues to increase. As of 2016, 27 percent, or 11.6 million hectares, of the total global organic agricultural land is in Europe (2016 Report – FiBL).

In 2007, sales of organic products were approximately 16 billion Euros. In 2007 the largest market for organic products was Germany with a turnover of 5.3 billion Euros, followed by the UK (2.6 billion Euros), France and Italy (both 1.9 billion Euros). In 2012 the total market share for organic products reached 7.8 percent in Denmark, the highest market share in the world.[29] According to the 2016 FiBL / IFOAM Report, in Europe the largest market of organic food sales is in Germany (7.9 billion Euros) and France (4.8 billion Euros) (FiBL and IFOAM – 2016). There was also an increase in growth in 2014 in Sweden In 2014, "by more than 40 percent – a remarkable rate for an already well-established market" (FiBL). In terms of sales of organic food products per capita, Switzerland (221 Euros) and Luxembourg (164 Euros) remain the highest in the 2014 statistics (FiBL and IFOAM – 2016).

Current statistics on Organic Agriculture in France:

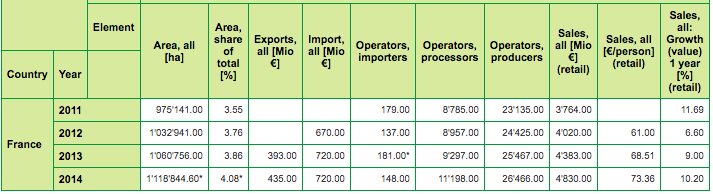
Statistics of French Farm Land, Organically Managed

According to Organic Europe, the organic food product market in France more than doubled between 2007 and 2013. The top selling products in the French organic market were "dry grocery products, canned foods, oils, dairy products, and fresh fruits and vegetables. The market channels for these goods are: General retailers (45.6 %), specialized organic retailers (34.1 %), small shops, such as bakeries and butchers (4.4 %), direct sales (11.8 %), catering (4.0 %). Some notable exports and imports include "Wine, selected categories of fruit and vegetables (cabbages, apricots, salads, nuts), and high value products (French specialties and delicatessen)" (Organic Europe- Country Report - France - 2012).

In terms of an organic logo, "There is a French logo, the AB mark, which is owned by the French Ministry of Agriculture which is used according to the AB mark rules" (Organic Europe – Country Report – France – 2012). There are also plans and policies in place in order to help promote organic and Biodynamic products in the market place. Some examples include the National action plan, the EU rural development program, etc. National action plan: The action plan Ambition Bio 2017 has the general goals of doubling the proportion of land farmed organically by the end of 2017, and promoting consumption of organic products. There are six main areas of activity: developing production; strengthening the organic food chain; developing domestic consumption and exports; strengthening research and the dissemination of results; training actors in the organic food chain; and adapting regulations. The EU rural development program that provides, "Compensatory payments are available for the conversion and maintenance of organic farms" (Organic Europe – 2012). Additionally, "Further policy support is given for the promotion of organic farming, food chain development, and research and extension services". (Organic Europe -2012).

Biodynamic and Organic Agriculture in France:

Support for organic farming in the European Union and the neighboring countries includes grants under rural development programs, legal protection and a European as well as national action plans. One of the key instruments of the European Action Plan on organic food and farming, an information campaign, was launched during 2008, with the aim of increasing awareness of organic farming throughout the European Union. Furthermore, most EU member states have national action plans. In order to boost organic farming research, a technology platform joining the efforts of industry and civil society in defining organic research priorities and defending them vis-à-vis the policy-makers was launched in December 2008. The platform's vision paper reveals the potential of organic food production to mitigate some of the major global problems from climate change and food security, to the whole range of socio-economic challenges in the rural areas.(FiBL, IFOAM, ITC 2009).

==== Organic Agriculture in Germany ====
Germany has its own set of regulations for organic farming under the German Council Regulation. It works with the International Federation of Organic Agriculture Movements (IFOAM), to ensure their regulations are in line with international trade regulations as well. These organizations combined cover 750 associations and 100 countries. There are few options for sellers when they are packaging organic products. They can choose to use or no to use an organic label on their products when they are coming from a third party country. It is, however, mandatory to write the organic products country of origin on the packaging. Within organic food production in Germany, treatments including ionizing radiation and genetically modified organisms (GMO) are prohibited.

The organic standards in Germany cover plant production, animal husbandry, aquaculture, wine, and third country imports. Key points for each standard area will be addressed. Plant production requires preservation of soil fertility and multi-annual crop rotations. Animal husbandry forbids tethering and promotes animal's natural immunological defense. Aquaculture protects marine animals and seaweed in that it aims to minimize the productions’ negative impact on aquatic environments. Wine regulations ban the use of labels stating "wine from organic production grapes" and only allows organic labels to be used if all organic products were used. Third country imports follow equivalence standards for production and inspection qualifications.

In 2014 Germany reached 1,047,633 hectares of farmland accounting for 6.3% of total farmland. This is a large increase compared to 2004 when Germany had 16,603 hectares of farmland accounting for 4.1% of total farmland. This increase in cropland is also reflective in the profits made. In 2004 Germany's organic production made 17,000 Euros on profits plus labor costs per man-work unit (MWU) compared to conventional farming which accounted for 20,000 Euros per MWU. In 2014 they made 33,000 Euros per MWU, compared to conventional farming which accounted for 33,000 Euros per MWU as well. The future of organic farming aims to use strategy along with political support to obtain its goals of creating a stronger organic farming production method.

=== North America ===
In North America, almost 2.2 million hectares are managed organically, representing approximately a 0.6 percent share of the total agricultural area. There are 12,064 organic farms. The major part of the organic land is in the US (1.6 million hectares in 2005). Seven percent of the world's organic agricultural land is in North America. Valued at more than 20 billion US Dollars in 2007 (Organic Monitor), the North American market accounted for 45 percent of global revenues. Growing consumer demand for healthy & nutritious foods and increasing distribution in conventional grocery channels are the major drivers of market growth. The U.S. organic industry grew 21 percent in sales in 2006, and was forecast to experience 18 percent sales growth each year on average from 2007 through 2010. Whether this rate will actually be realized is uncertain due to the economic downturn and reduction in consumer spending in the last quarter of 2008. Likewise, a downturn is expected in Canada, even though the market growth in Canada, paired with the introduction of the new organic regulations, should provide a good outlook over the coming years. In the United States, the National Organic Program has been in force since 2002. Canada has had a strong organic standard since 1999; this had been, however, voluntary and not supported by regulation. Canada's Organic Product Regulation will be fully implemented on June 30, 2009. Canadian labeling requirements will be very similar to those of the US and the EU. In 2008, the new Farm Bill was passed by the US Congress. Increasing expenditures on organic agriculture and programs to approximately 112 million US Dollars1 over the course of its five-year life, the 2008 Farm Bill provides a fivefold increase for the organic sector compared with federal funding in the previous bill.(FiBL, IFOAM, ITC 2009).

Organic farms in the United States had sales totaling $5.5 billion in 2014, a 72 percent increase from the 2008 total.

=== Latin America and the Caribbean ===
In Latin America, 220’000 producers managed 6.4 million hectares of agricultural land organically in 2007. This constitutes 20 percent of the world's organic land. The leading countries are Argentina (2'777'959 hectares), Brazil (1'765'793 hectares) and Uruguay(930'965 hectares). The highest shares of organic agricultural land are in the Dominican Republic and Uruguay with more than six percent and in Mexico and Argentina with more than two percent. Most organic production in Latin America is for export. Important crops are tropical fruits, grains and cereals, coffee and cocoa, sugar and meats. Most organic food sales in the domestic markets of the countries occur in major cities such as Buenos Aires, Mexico City and São Paulo.

Fifteen countries have legislation on organic farming, and four additional countries are currently developing organic regulations. Costa Rica and Argentina have both attained third country status according to the EU regulation on organic farming.

In recognition of the growing importance of the organic sector to Latin America's agricultural economy, governmental institutions have begun to take steps towards increasing involvement; governments are beginning to play a central role in the promotion of organic agriculture. The types of support in Latin American countries range from organic agriculture promotion programs to market access support by export agencies. In a few countries, limited financial support is being given to pay certification cost during the conversion period.

An important process underway in many Latin America countries is the establishment of regulations and standards for the organic sector (FiBL, IFOAM, ITC 2009).

=== Oceania ===
This region includes Australia, New Zealand, and island states like Fiji, Papua New Guinea, Tonga and Vanuatu. Altogether, there are 7'222 producers, managing almost 12.1 million hectares. This constitutes 2.6 percent of the agricultural land in the area and 38 percent of the world's organic land. Ninety-nine percent of the organically managed land in the region is in Australia (12 million hectares, 97 percent extensive grazing land), followed by New Zealand (65’000 hectares) and Vanuatu (8'996 hectares). The highest shares of all agricultural land are in Vanuatu (6.1 percent), Samoa (5.5 percent) and the Solomon Islands (3.1 percent). Growth in the organic industry in Australia, New Zealand and the Pacific Islands has been strongly influenced by rapidly growing overseas demand; domestic markets are, however, growing. In New Zealand, a key issue is lack of production to meet growing demand.

Australia has had national standards for organic and bio-dynamic products in place since 1992, and like New Zealand, it is on the third country list of the European Union. It is expected that the Australian Standard, based on the National Standard employed since the early 1990s for the export market, will be adopted in 2009. In New Zealand, a National Organic Standard was launched in 2003. There is little government support to encourage organic agriculture in Australia. However, over the recent past, governments have been supportive of the Australian Standards issue. Furthermore, funding is made available to promote an understanding among consumers. In New Zealand, through the establishment of the sector umbrella organization Organics Aotearoa New Zealand and the Organic Advisory Programme as well as other initiatives, there is political recognition of the benefits of organic agriculture.

In the Pacific Islands work on a regional strategy and national plans to lay the foundation of sustainable organic agriculture development in the region is in progress. The Regional Organic Task Force, a technical group representing all sectors and countries involved in organics, was charged with developing the Pacific Standard and will be responsible for implementing the Regional Action Plan. Pacific High Level Organics Group consists of Pacific leaders who have shown a commitment to the development of organic agriculture in the region and provide high-level political support and advocacy. The first Pacific Organic Standard was endorsed by Pacific Leaders in September 2008. This provides a platform for further regional policy development around organic agriculture. (FiBL, IFOAM, ITC 2009).

== See also ==
- List of countries by organic farmland
