= Hartmut Vogtmann =

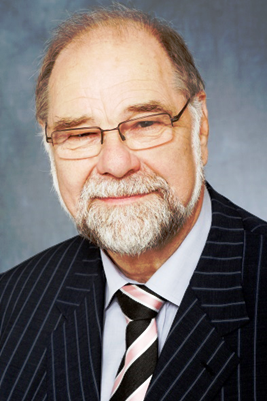
Prof. Dr.Hartmut Vogtmann

Hartmut Vogtmann (born in 1942, in Essen, Germany) is honored as a pioneer in organic agriculture in Germany as well as other countries. He contributes his knowledge and direct engagement to promote organic agriculture in many countries. Specially, he acted as an advisor to Prince Charles since the 1980s in organic agriculture. From 2012 to February 2015 he was president of the umbrella NGO "German League for Nature and Environment" (DNR) with an individual membership of more than 5 million. He served this organisation from 2008 until 2012 as its first vice-president. From 2008 until 2011 he was the president of the foundation for the conservation of the European Natural Heritage "Euronatur".

== Career ==
=== Academic career ===
Vogtmann holds a PhD in agriculture and food science from the Swiss Federal Institute of Technology in Zurich and he was teaching at the University of Alberta in Canada from 1971 till. He has published a great number of scientific publications and books in the field of efficient resource management and sustainable agriculture.

Vogtmann was appointed as a professor for agriculture at the University of Kassel, holding the first chair for organic farming in Germany (and certainly European wide) from 1981 - 1994. From 1974 to 1981 Hardy Vogtmann was the first director of the Swiss Research Institute for Organic Farming (FIBL) in Oberwil, Switzerland, and in this capacity he was instrumental for the International Federation of Organic Agricultural Movements (IFOAM), of which he is honorary president.

He is a member of the editorial board of the international peer reviewed journal "Future of Food Journal".

=== Policy making engagement ===
Vogtmann was the CEO of the Hesse State Office for regional development and agriculture (1994 – 2000) in Kassel, Germany. He was the president of the German Federal Agency for Nature Conservation in Bonn from 2000 to 2007,
