= Groundcycle =

New York City-based biodegradable waste company

- Industry: Compost collection services
- Founded: May 2020; 5 years ago
- Founder: Vivian Lin
- Area served: New York City
- Website: groundcycle.org

Groundcycle is a New York City-based biodegradable waste management company that provides local produce deliveries and compost collection services. It was founded in May 2020 by Brooklyn native, Vivian Lin. Services include "bin swaps", a door-to-door service where fresh produce is exchanged for food scraps.

== History ==
During the COVID-19 pandemic, New York City temporarily shut down their composting program and local farms could not sell their produce. In May 2020, Vivian Lin, a Brooklyn native with a bachelor's degree in architecture from Rensselaer Polytechnic Institute (RPI), created Groundcycle to address the city's limitations in composting. In shifting her focus on sustainability, Lin understood farmers to take organic trash in order to turn it into nutrient rich fertilizer. In the early developments, Lin's friends, family, and volunteers helped transport food scraps to the farms, with thirteen of Lin's friends signing up in the first week to help. Two months later, Lin quit her job at an architecture firm to pursue Groundcycle full-time. In early development, Lin called around 40 farms to explore the exchange of food scraps with the farms' produce.

Although New York City has since reinstated is compost program, Groundcycle addresses the city's limited coverage and supporting areas without access. As of 2022, Groundcycle also operated a Compost Hub every Sunday at Vinegar Hill Community Garden, where locals exchanged their compost for fresh produce.

== Services ==
Groundcycle charges households to take their organic waste in exchange for local farm produce. Moreover, the company pays farms to take the organic waste.

== Reception ==
In February 2021, ABC7 New York reported that Lin had "two cars working to sort 50,000 pounds of garbage". A Groundcycle customer comments they still pay for the services despite the city's free services because of "the community aspect of it is really special and a big part of why [they're] staying".
