= Bioherbicide =

Biological weed control agent

Bioherbicides are herbicides consisting of phytotoxins, pathogens, and other microbes used as biological weed control. Bioherbicides may be compounds and secondary metabolites derived from microbes such as fungi, bacteria or protozoa; or phytotoxic plant residues, extracts or single compounds derived from other plant species.

== Production ==
The production of bioherbicides is a process of biosynthesis where different mediums ranging from soybean bran to corn steep liquor are fermented to obtain desirable results. In addition to solid-state fermentation, bioherbicides can also be produced by submerged fermentation in stirred tanks or in other environments. Despite the ‘eco-friendliness’, there are several obstructions that make it less practical to use bioherbicides in fields because the lab results may not be the same as the real results.

== Current status ==
With increasing awareness of the effects of the chemical herbicides and pesticides, bioherbicides can be adopted as an alternative especially for integrated weed management. The market share of bioherbicides is merely 10% of all biopesticides. On the other hand, the research spanning over two decades since 1980s has also falsified the principle that there is a coevolved natural enemy of a host weed which can manage weed through varied formulation and thus advocated for more research to culturally and genetically intensify the bioherbicidal organisms. Efficiency and efficacy of bioherbicides is impeded by changing weather and temperature and this can further obstruct the application and integration of bioherbicides. A study shows that covering with jute turf, which retains moistures and allows one third of the sunlight to pass through, can increase the efficiency of bioherbicides and also remove some of the hindrances from the commercialization and marketing of bioherbicides.

While it is true that after their 'discovery' the bioherbicides are not readily available on the market for various reasons, advocates of bioherbicides argue that bioherbicide researchers should collaborate with other researchers and seek more public sector funding so that bioherbicides can become more marketable and attain more market share. Simultaneously, research from Canada indicates that legislative and policy dynamics have great power to accelerate the innovation and integration of bioherbicides other microbial pest-control products.

== Available bioherbicides ==
While 13 different products have been launched, as of 2016, only nine bioherbicides were being marketed:

1. Devine (1981)
2. Collego (1982)
3. BioMal (1992)
4. Woad Warrior (2002)
5. Chontrol (2005)
6. Smoulder (2005)
7. Sarritor (2007)
8. Organo-Sol (2010)
9. Beloukha (2015)
