= Ecuador composting method =

Small scale method of composting organic materials practiced by indigenous peoples

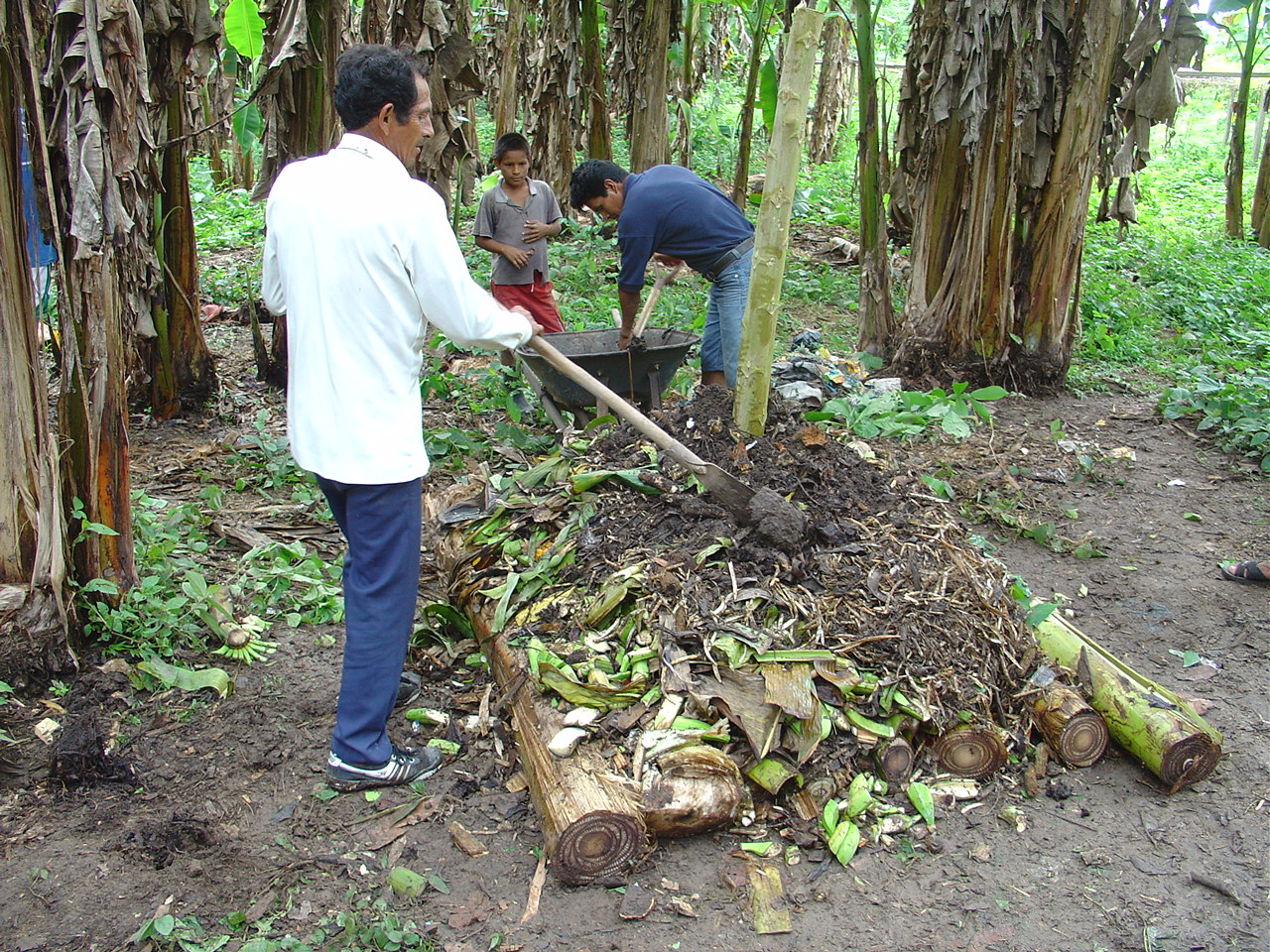
A mud layer being placed on a layer of organic biomass, Monte de los Olivos, Ucayali, Peru

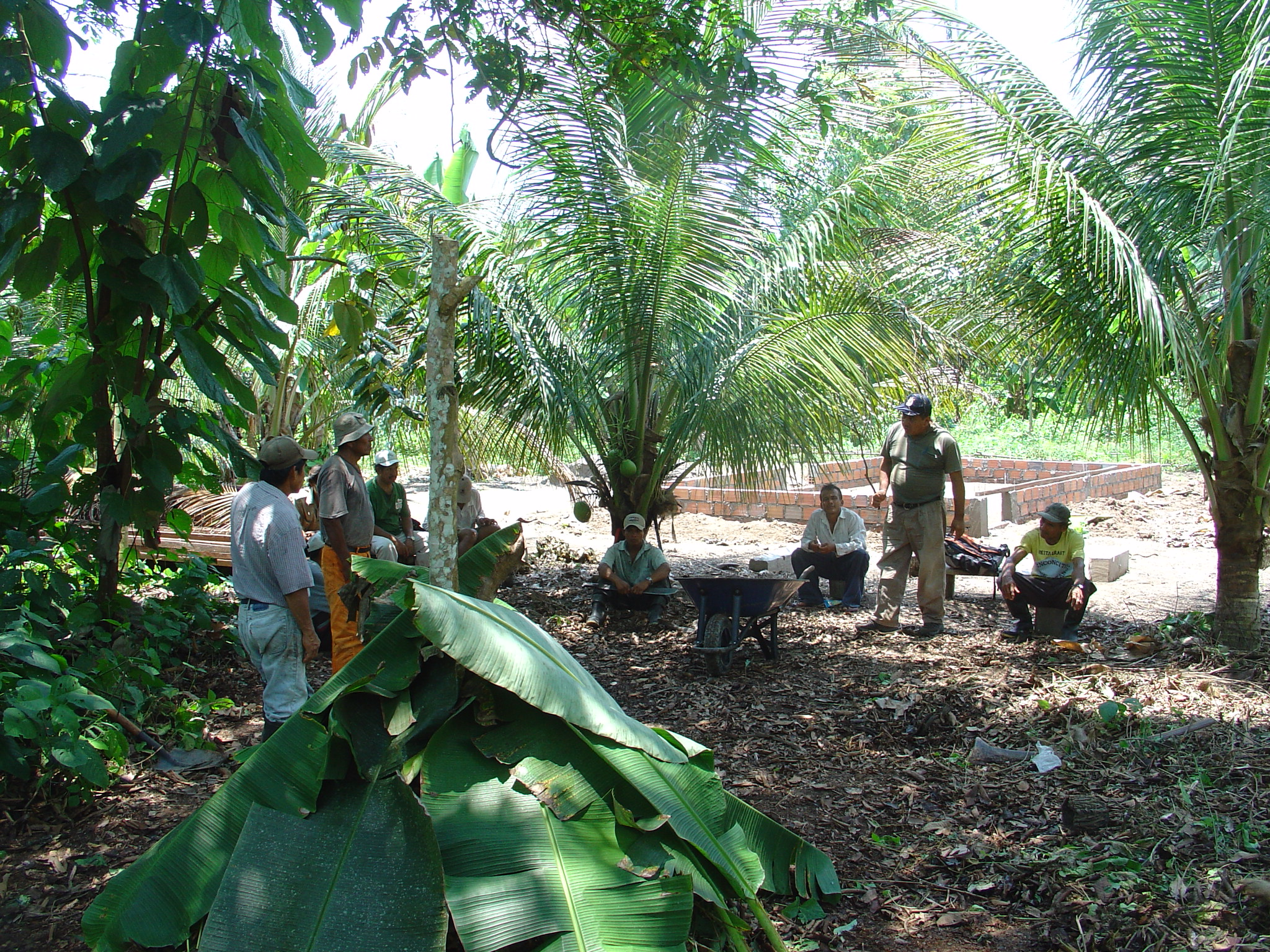
Compost pile covered by leaves of banana (Musa), Santa Tereza, Ucayali, Peru

The Ecuador composting method is a traditional small-scale composting technique commonly practiced in the lowland regions of Ecuador and Peru. This method involves constructing a compost pile on a trunk or banana stalks with a central pole inserted in the middle. Organic matter is layered on the base and covered with soil or other organic matter. After the pile reaches a certain height, it is watered and covered with large leaves. Once the compost settles, the central pole is removed to facilitate aeration. This method is typically used by indigenous communities and serves as an effective way to recycle organic waste in these regions.
