= The Society for the Preservation of Wild Culture =

Toronto arts organization

The Society for the Preservation of Wild Culture (SPWC) was a Toronto arts organization in existence from 1986 to 1991 that explored environmental and ecological issues from an artistic perspective in a "quirky and innovative" way. The SPWC was best known for three programs: a literary magazine, The Journal of Wild Culture; artist-guided walks, "landscape readings"; and a series of cabarets, The Café of Wild Culture.

The organization was a unique hybrid. The oxymoron "wild culture" tweaked the interest of contrasting types: artists, scientists and activists, and the efforts made by the organization to develop creative projects and discourse around the term were well received. It was concurrently accepted as an arts organization by artists and an environmental organization by environmentalists.

The organization was resurrected in 2011 and is now producing an online magazine based in London and Toronto.

== Art and ecology ==
The style of the organization was determined by how participating artists expressed themselves around the undefined idea of "wild culture" (also see "wild culture"). While calling for new articulations of wild culture through its projects, at its height the society filled the cultural vacuum in Toronto with an eclectic kind of "thinking man's" fun and provided a forum for experimentation amongst performance artists. The broader public was encouraged by the SPWC to engage with questions about nature and art, while frequently congregating in the outdoors. This audience was also attracted to the organization's ability to 'soft pedal doom and gloom while partying for the planet".

During a landscape reading on the aboriginal history of downtown Toronto, poet M. T. Kelly offered a view of how the SPWC sought to affect its audience: "There is a bridge between history and landscape. To get people to change their view of the environment, you can't just argue in economic terms. It's an emotional thing. People act politically when they get emotionally involved".

The notion of "wild culture" grew out of multidisciplinary artist Whitney Smith's experience of "a spiritual updraft in the art spheres" while foraging wild foods in the Ontario forest that he sold to local chefs. From 1982 to 1985 a series of three performances, "Fern Policy", explored the possibilities of artistic growth in the nature-culture ecotone. In May 1985 Smith made the first public announcement on the formation of the society at a Toronto art event, "L'Affaire 'Pataphysique", that presented examples of 'pataphysics by local artists parodying theory and methods of modern science. Following this event Smith began recruiting artists to help develop The Journal of Wild Culture.

== Defining wild culture ==
Though there were attempts by the organization to define "wild culture", there was never an accepted definition. Smith preferred his colleagues and audiences to find wild culture's meaning through the titles of the projects in which it appeared, where the social context was at play; that is, that there existed a serious-sounding and possibly genuine academic journal published by a preserving society with a long name, all devoted to a subject no one knew anything about. Negotiating the serious and the non-serious in a way that made sense and entertained became part of the artists' work.

Before there was Smith's recent definition of wild culture ("the articulated ecotone between what humans do and what they can't control in nature"), no single explanation existed around which the S.P.W.C artists" work was done. Some said that it was the vagueness of the idea, the inability to pin it down, that made it so attractive. In the absence of concrete description, Smith offered a metaphor, which he has recently modified: On the surface of a transparent painting is the human geographic reality that is part of our everyday life, and in the background are elements of nature, seen and unseen, that are very much alive but that people aren"t always aware of, whether out of convenience, ignorance, apathy, or any state of unconsciousness or self-centeredness that contributes to the disconnection from our primal history and our present psychic hold on the home terrain. Wild culture is the two planes, foreground and background, seen together.

== Programs ==
=== The Journal of Wild Culture ===
The literary organ of the SPWC, its subtitle, ecology, and imagination, spoke to the notion of The Journal of Wild Culture being a platform for artists to express themselves through the lens, or mirror, of the natural world. Smith said that "one of the things wild culture is, is a tolerance for ambiguity and an acceptance that things cannot be defined". The "quirky and innovative" magazine carried on its discourse in a way that influenced the way more serious themes could be delivered with a sense of play and timeliness.

==== Organic start ====
Born out of the wild foods foraging of founder Whitney Smith, the magazine was conceived in 1986–1987 by an editorial team that included Smith and architect Peter Ferguson, public relations consultant Kim Obrist and filmmaker and publisher Christopher Lowry. Smith attributed his inspiration for the formation of the society to the National Geographic Society (which published its own journal) and FILE magazine, produced by the conceptual and media-based art collective, General Idea, and to the Utne Reader's use of other published materials. The SPWC was in production in Toronto from 1986 to 1991.

Graphic designer Bernard Stockl became the art director and quickly established the look of the magazine, including the characteristic contents page. Smith and Lowry assembled a photocopied "Journal of Wild Culture" Preview Issue that was circulated in the arts community, and a donation of $5000 "from an anonymous angel" followed, just enough to pay for the printing of the first issue.

==== Recruitment through social events ====
The premier issue was launched on July 27, 1987, at the Wild Culture Hoedown on Toronto Island. It was described by Smith at the time as "a cross between a literary journal and an arty comic book with ecology as its theme". Future Wild Culture events followed the format and spirit of the Hoedown by offering down-home high-end cuisine using wild foods and made on site by Chris Klugman, a well-known local chef, and featuring artists whose personae related to nature themes: the Marquis de Sod and Mr. Potatohead were the guests of honour at the launch. Poet Christopher Dewdney, an early contributor to the magazine, said that "half of the experience at "The Journal of Wild Culture" is the parties.) Volume I, Number 1 was sold for $3.95 and 3000 copies were widely distributed in Canada by Disticor, and the issue sold out; later distribution of increased numbers went into the U.S. It developed a small but devoted fan base, particularly in British Columbia. In 1990 its southwestern U.S. distributor reported that the magazine had "a cult following in Texas".

==== Visual language ====
Smith said that Stockl, who died of AIDS-related causes in 1993, was a significant contributor to JWC. "Bernie's deep sense of graphic taste and design intelligence struck the right tone with the first issue: serious like an academic journal but also accessible and visually engaging. In order for the quirkiness to work we needed the credible and elegant look that his gave us". Stockl said he modeled the JWC design after "Harper's" and "Arts and Architecture": "The trick was to create certain effects with what was available to us. Trying to cheat our way through it without it looking like that". The Bernard Franklin Stockl Memorial Scholarship is offered annually at the Alberta College of Design for "creative and innovative exploration in the use of typography for the purpose of communication".

==== Difficulties and demise ====
In the late 1980s, when advertisers were slow to embrace the few existing green magazines, and particularly one which the Utne Reader editor, Eric Utne, called "indescribable", low ad sales made it difficult to pay the bills and meet that quarterly schedule; only seven issues were published. Two Wild Culture auctions and funding from the federal and provincials arts councils helped take up the slack, but with a low subscription base and advertising revenue, a sudden drop in grant revenue, fund-raising and marketing fatigue, Smith's reluctance to step into the role of "a career publisher", the magazine decided to take a sabbatical. More recently Smith commented on his own burn-out keeping the magazine and the SPWC going, the dilemma of the artist-publisher, and the difficulty of keeping cultural magazines afloat in factors relating to demise of JWC. In early 1991, on CBC radio's "Arts Report", it was announced that the magazine was suspending publication. The plan was to pursue a more economically feasible course by following the format of Granta magazine, offering it as a trade paperback available in bookstores. A pilot issue of selections from past JWC issues was put out by Somerville House in 1992, Wild Culture, edited by Smith and Lowry, but sales were not encouraging; one explanation for this was that the book did not offer new material.

An attempt by Smith and some new colleagues in 2002 to resurrect the Journal of Wild Culture online never got off the ground. Smith said that wild culture was "a notion with a mind of its own" and that "the ingredients for a re-launch in 2002 just weren't there".

=== Landscape Readings ===
Landscape Readings were public walking tours led by artists of outdoor environments that held an intellectual or personal interest for the artist. Landscape Readings were a hybrid that combined the attraction of authors reading their own works with a bracing picnic outing in a setting which combines the context for a lecture on ecology, geology, history or biography.

The readings were a project initially conceived by Smith to provide a venue for writer and poet Christopher Dewdney to share his extensive knowledge of palaeozoic geology, among other things, and his sense of humor. In July 1987 he gave the first landscape reading of Toronto's High Park Carolinian forest, which was documented in the forthcoming issue of The Journal of Wild Culture.

Other artist guides included Gordon Rayner, Hank Hedges, M. T. Kelly, June Callwood, Larry Zolf, Joyce Weiland, and architect Donald Schmitt. The Readings were created to "give [SPWC participating] artists a new venue".

=== The Café of Wild Culture ===
The Café of Wild Culture was conceived in collaboration with bookseller and film programmer Marc Glassman, who recognized that the sense of humor that was so much a part of the 60s and 70s was missing in the 80s. The Café was performed first in Toronto at The Rivoli, and later in New York at the Village Gate and at Goddard College in Vermont. Its legitimate non-theatre style played off the vaudeville and variety revue made up of several short unrelated acts (in the Café's case, no longer than 7 minutes) that caught the wild culture spirit of thoughtful irreverence.

Acts ranged from tendentious 'pataphysics lectures, authentic scientific explanations, obtuse dance works, gentlemen's shirt-ironing contests, and wild food cooking demonstrations, in which small servings were provided for the audience, and a game called StorySlide where artists improvised a performed text based on a random photographic slide show.

=== Other programs ===
Smith met his match when he began a project called the Great Festival of the Lakes, which was to encourage the presentation of community arts festivals in Great Lakes cities. "I was very concerned about water quality issues at the time, and thought that the SPWC needed an activist project to sponsor. I was wrong. Organizing anything around the Great Lakes is like trying to organize Europe. I learned a lot about underestimating scale on that one, and spreading myself too thin". The project was abandoned after a couple of years.

In 1990, the SPWC worked with an organization started by Michael Stadtlander and Jamie Kennedy, Knives and Forks, on Spring Feast, which became a precursor of future events promoting local chefs and wild and organic foods.

== The Journal of Wild Culture 2.0 ==
From September 2011 Smith's work on the SPWC focused on the online publishing platform, The Journal of Wild Culture.

The project was beta-launched in December 2012 in London as www.wildculture.com by an editorial and design team including Smith, Joe Hedges of Branding by Garden, Tom Jeffreys, Sarah Lester, Rosie Jackson and Liam Desroy, continued with Smith, Jeffreys and designer Hedges from February to October 2013. This was around the same time that Smith took over sole editorial responsibilities, in collaboration, until 2016, with board members Lisa Wilson and Richard Stursberg, who continues to participate in an advisory role. The publication has no advertising, sent out a weekly Sunday Edition newsletter until 2018 when it became biweekly, and is supported by donations and the work of a growing community of international contributors.
