= List of countries by organic farmland =

This article is a list of countries by organic farmland.

As of 2023, approximately 99,000,000 hectares (240,000,000 acres) worldwide were farmed organically, representing approximately 2.1% of total world farmland.

== Countries and territories ==
All areas are given in hectares. Source: FIBL

Country	Area 2020	Organic share 2020 (Note: % of total farmland)
Afghanistan	98	0.0003%
Albania	887	0.1%
Algeria	772	0.002%
Andorra	2	0.0%
Argentina	4,453,639	3.0%
Armenia	566	0.03%
Australia	35,687,799	9.9%
Austria	679,872	26.5%
Azerbaijan	38,080	0.8%
Bahamas	49	0.3%
Bangladesh	504	0.01%
Belarus	6,838	0.1%
Belgium	99,075	7.2%
Belize	454	0.3%
Benin	38,822	1.0%
Bhutan	4,095	0.8%
Bolivia	179,425	0.5%
Bosnia and Herzegovina	1,692	0.1%
Brazil	1,319,454	0.6%
British Virgin Islands	26	0.4%
Bulgaria	116,253	2.3%
Burkina Faso	66,175	0.5%
Burundi	319	0.02%
Cambodia	35,879	0.6%
Cameroon	345	0.004%
Canada	1,417,612	2.4%
Cape Verde	3	0.003%
Channel Islands	180	2.0%
Chile	156,819	1.0%
China	2,435,000	0.5%
Colombia	50,533	0.1%
Comoros	1,004	0.8%
Cook Islands	15	1.0%
Costa Rica	11,465	0.6%
Croatia	108,610	7.2%
Cuba	2,129	0.03%
Cyprus	5,918	4.4%
Czech Republic	539,532	15.3%
Democratic Republic of the Congo	118,254	0.4%
Denmark	299,998	11.4%
Dominican Republic	117,312	4.8%
Ecuador	41,537	0.8%
Egypt	116,000	3.0%
El Salvador	2,569	0.2%
Estonia	220,796	22.4%
Eswatini	1,156	0.1%
Ethiopia	234,648	0.6%
Falkland Islands	31,937	2.8%
Faroe Islands	251	8.4%
Fiji	19,303	4.5%
Finland	315,112	13.9%
France	2,548,677	8.8%
French Guiana	3,690	11.3%
French Polynesia	1,562	3.4%
Georgia	1,572	0.1%
Germany	1,702,240	10.2%
Ghana	74,874	0.5%
Greece	534,629	10.1%
Grenada	84	1.1%
Guadeloupe	858	1.7%
Guatemala	87,028	2.3%
Guinea-Bissau	9,844	1.2%
Haiti	2,907	0.2%
Honduras	66,179	2.0%
Hungary	301,430	6.0%
Iceland	4,709	0.3%
India	2,657,889	1.5%
Indonesia	75,793	0.1%
Iran	11,916	0.03%
Iraq	63	0.001%
Ireland	73,952	1.6%
Israel	6,287	1.0%
Italy	2,095,380	16.0%
Ivory Coast	79,125	0.4%
Jamaica	10	0.002%
Japan	11,992	0.3%
Jordan	1,446	0.1%
Kazakhstan	114,886	0.1%
Kenya	123,744	0.4%
Kosovo	1,604	0.4%
Kuwait	33	0.02%
Kyrgyzstan	30,259	0.3%
Laos	3,266	0.1%
Latvia	291,150	14.8%
Lebanon	1,715	0.3%
Liechtenstein	1,490	41.6%
Lithuania	235,471	8.0%
Luxembourg	6,118	4.6%
Madagascar	103,817	0.3%
Malawi	232	0.004%
Malaysia	1,276	0.01%
Mali	14,675	0.04%
Malta	67	0.6%
Martinique	683	2.2%
Mauritius	5	0.01%
Mayotte	87	0.4%
Mexico	215,634	0.2%
Moldova	27,624	1.2%
Mongolia	241	0.0002%
Montenegro	4,823	1.9%
Morocco	11,452	0.04%
Mozambique	14,438	0.03%
Myanmar	10,143	0.1%
Nepal	9,361	0.2%
Netherlands	71,607	3.9%
New Caledonia	800	0.4%
New Zealand	79,347	0.8%
Nicaragua	39,076	0.8%
Nigeria	54,995	0.1%
Niue	43	0.9%
North Macedonia	3,727	0.3%
Norway	45,312	4.6%
Oman	4	0.0003%
Pakistan	69,850	0.2%
Palestine	5,218	1.1%
Panama	5,929	0.3%
Papua New Guinea	72,477	6.1%
Paraguay	73,428	0.3%
Peru	342,701	1.5%
Philippines	191,770	1.5%
Poland	507,637	3.5%
Portugal	319,540	8.1%
Réunion	1,901	4.0%
Romania	468,887	3.5%
Russia	615,188	0.3%
Rwanda	5,188	0.3%
Samoa	40,992	14.5%
São Tomé and Príncipe	9,103	20.7%
Saudi Arabia	26,632	0.02%
Senegal	3,809	0.04%
Serbia	19,317	0.6%
Sierra Leone	219,861	5.6%
Singapore	15	2.2%
Slovakia	222,896	11.7%
Slovenia	52,078	10.8%
Solomon Islands	3,367	2.9%
South Africa	40,954	0.04%
South Korea	38,540	2.3%
Spain	2,437,891	10.0%
Sri Lanka	73,393	2.6%
Suriname	52	0.1%
Sweden	613,964	20.4%
Switzerland	177,347	17.0%
Taiwan	10,789	1.4%
Tajikistan	11,818	0.2%
Tanzania	198,226	0.5%
Thailand	160,802	0.7%
Timor-Leste	32,311	8.5%
Togo	127,782	3.3%
Tonga	1,119	3.2%
Tunisia	297,137	3.0%
Turkey	382,639	1.0%
Uganda	116,376	0.8%
Ukraine	462,225	1.1%
United Arab Emirates	5,419	1.4%
United Kingdom	473,500	2.7%
United States	2,326,551	0.6%
Uruguay	2,742,368	19.6%
Uzbekistan	3,781	0.01%
Vanuatu	2,052	1.1%
Venezuela	1,490	0.01%
Vietnam	63,536	0.5%
Zambia	691	0.003%
Zimbabwe	1,043	0.01%

== Biodynamic farmland ==
Biodynamic agriculture is practiced in 55 countries, with a world total of 251,842 certified biodynamic hectares. With Europe dominating the world map.
All areas are given in hectares. Source: American Institute of Science.

Country	Area 2020
Argentina	1,187
Australia	49,797
Austria	7,164
Belgium	143
Brazil	3,388
Chile	1,474
China	108
Colombia	106
Costa Rica	11
Croatia	68
Czech Republic	3,537
Denmark	2,998
Dominican Republic	1,410
Ecuador	512
Egypt	2,610
Ethiopia	32
Finland	384
France	14,629
Germany	84,426
Greece	381
Guinea-Bissau	694
Honduras	72
Hungary	6,371
India	9,303
Iran	72
Ireland	93
Israel	106
Italy	10,781
Liechtenstein	3
Lithuania	1,389
Luxembourg	536
Mexico	304
Morocco	27
Nepal	118
Netherlands	8,681
New Zealand	928
Norway	548
Paraguay	996
Peru	307
Poland	4,261
Portugal	574
Romania	200
Serbia	35
Slovakia	169
Slovenia	238
South Africa	245
Spain	7,743
Sri Lanka	1,479
Sweden	873
Switzerland	5,070
Tunisia	699
Turkey	1,148
Uganda	527
United Kingdom	3,886
United States	9,001

== Non-certified organic farmland ==
Percentages of farmland being used organically may vary because guidelines of organic farming practices vary across nations. For example, Cuba has a significant portion of its agricultural land managed without synthetic chemicals. Estimates suggest that about 25% of Cuban farms operate organically. However, in terms of land area officially classified as organic farmland, sources report a much smaller figure, around 0.03%, indicating a difference between formal certification and actual farming practices. This discrepancy can be explained by Cuba's widespread use of agroecological methods such as Organopónicos, especially in urban and small-scale farms, which may not always be formally certified but still follow organic principles.

In 2012, Bhutan set the ambitious goal to become the world's first 100% organic farming country. However, the percentage of officially certified organic farmland in Bhutan was about 5.6% in 2022. Despite this, over 80% of Bhutanese farmers practice traditional farming methods that are largely chemical-free, which aligns closely with organic principles, and their products are sold without organic certification but considered as organic.
