= Research Institute of Organic Agriculture =

Swiss-based research institute

- (in German) Forschungsinstitut für biologischen Landbau (in French) Institut de recherche de l'agriculture biologique (in Italian) Istituto di ricerche dell’agricoltura biologica
- Motto: Excellence for sustainability
- Established: 1973; 53 years ago
- Research type: Applied research
- Field of research: Organic agriculture
- Staff: 175 (Switzerland); 30 (Germany); 18 (Austria)
- Location: Frick, Switzerland (main); Germany; Austria
- Website: www.fibl.org

The Research Institute of Organic Agriculture (German: Forschungsinstitut für biologischen Landbau, in short: FiBL), is an organic farming information and research centre. As an independent and non-profit organization, it promotes research and projects that help farmers improve their productivity with consideration of environmental and health impacts.

The Research Institute of Organic Agriculture FiBL is one of the world's leading institutes in the field of organic agriculture. Its locations are situated in Switzerland (founded in 1973), Germany (2000), Austria (2004), France (2017) and a representation in Brussels/Belgium (2017) through FiBL Europe. FiBL's strengths lie in its interdisciplinary research, innovations developed jointly with farmers and the food industry, solution-oriented development projects and rapid knowledge transfer from research into practice. In 2024, the Swiss centre employs more than 300 people.

== History ==
The Forschungsinstitut für biologischen Landbau (FiBL) was founded in Switzerland in 1973 by a group of organic farmers and scientists who wanted to promote the growth of the organic farming industry. At the time, the organic movement was still in its initial stages. The founders of FiBL wanted to create a foundation that was exclusively developed to disseminating information and practical advice to farmers who wanted to depart from conventional practices.

== See also ==
- Agriculture in Switzerland
