= Alnatura =

German chain of organic food supermarkets

Alnatura Produktions- und Handels GmbH
- Type: Gesellschaft mit beschränkter Haftung
- Industry: Grocery store, health food store
- Founded: 1984
- Headquarters: Darmstadt, Germany
- Key people: Götz Rehn (CEO); Rüdiger Kasch (CEO); Herwarth von Plate (CEO)
- Revenue: €1.08 billion EUR (2019/20)
- Number of employees: about 3500 (2019/20)
- Website: alnatura.de

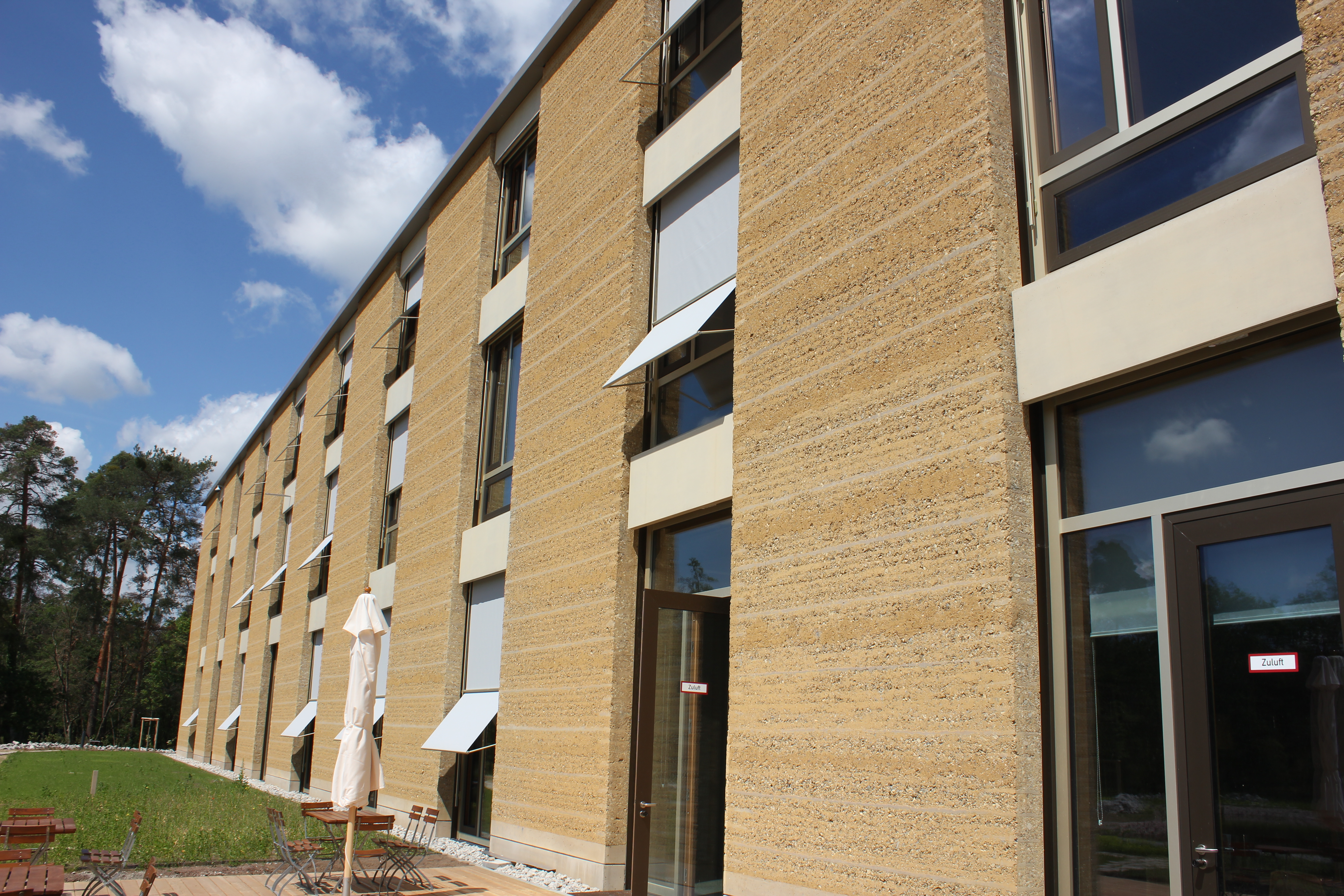
Headquarter in Darmstadt, 2019

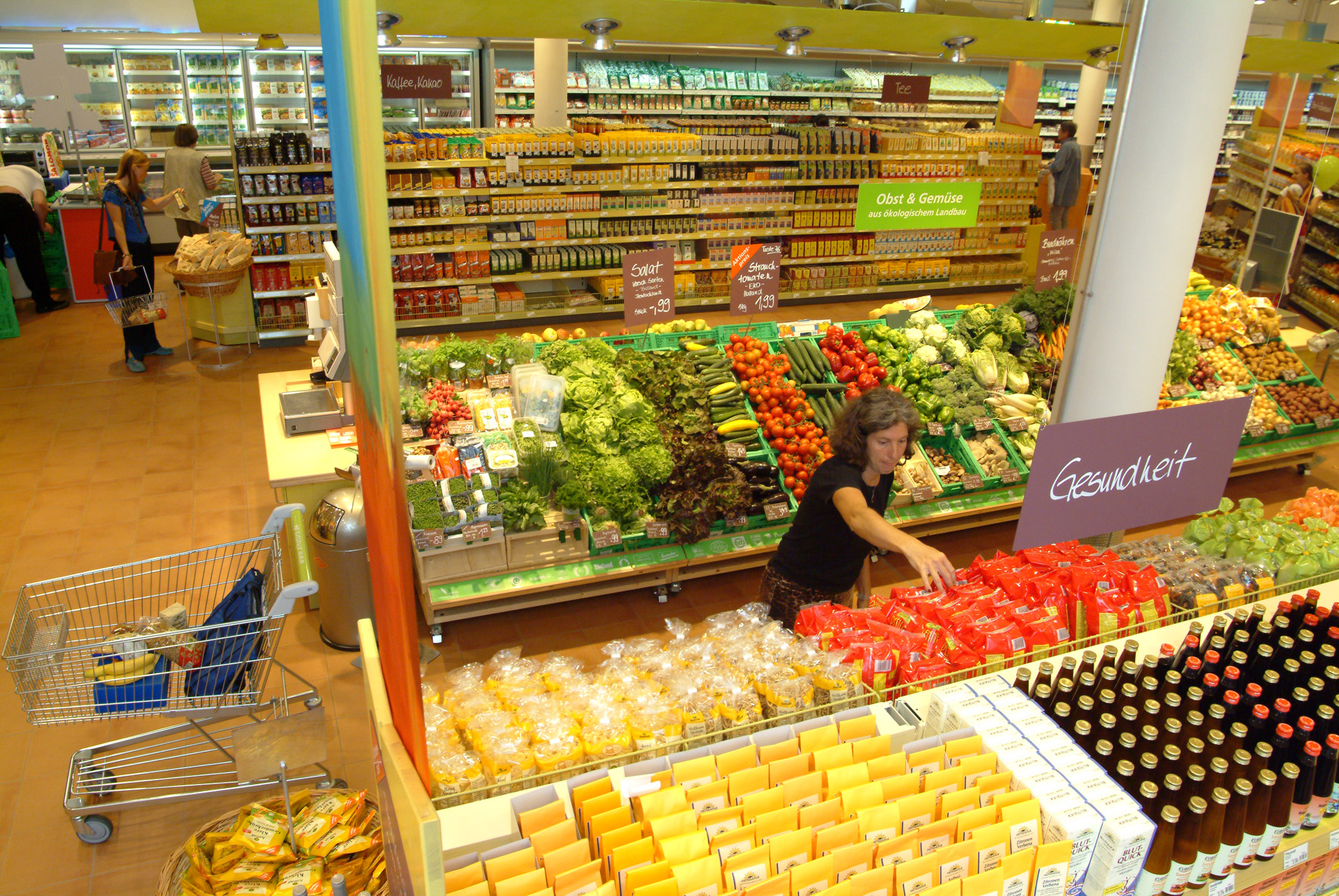
View of "Super Natur Markt"

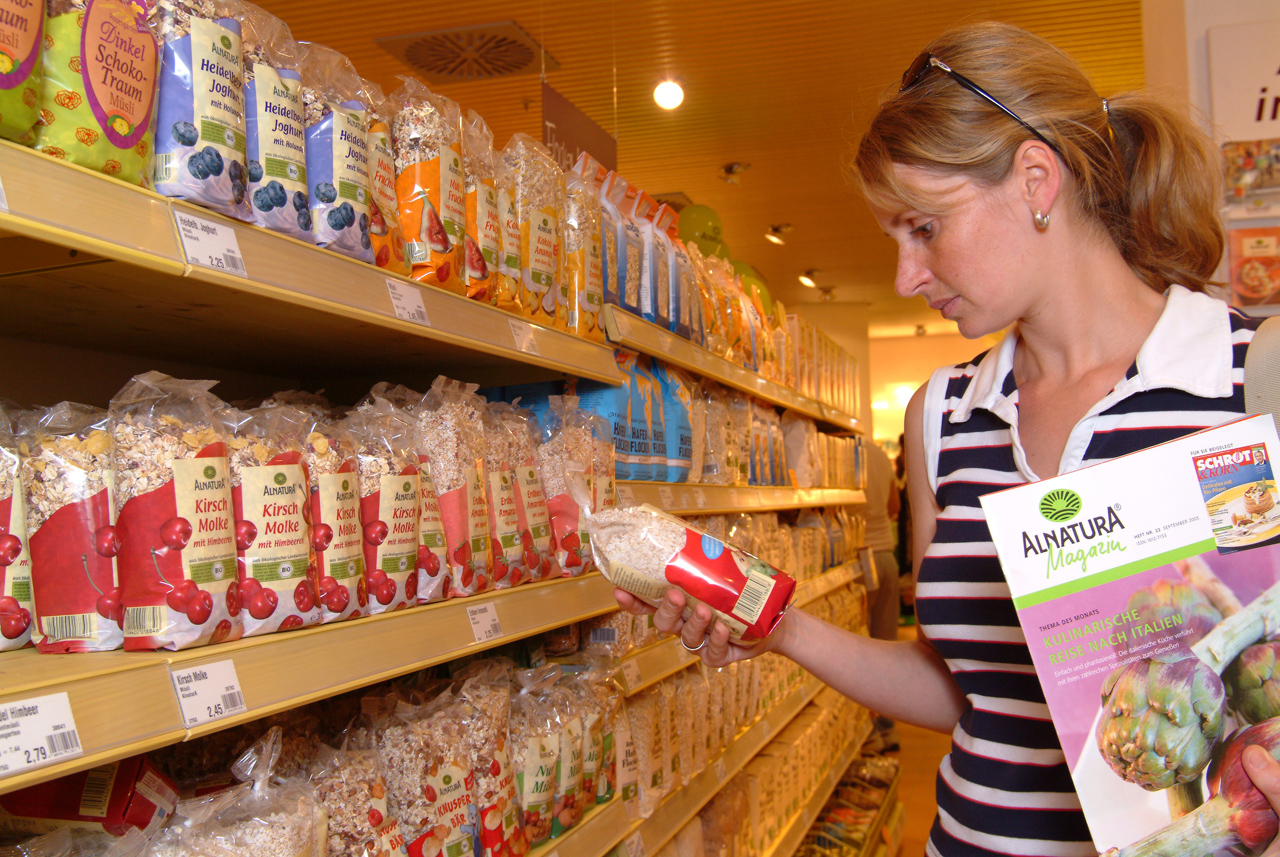
Shelf with grain products in a store of the chain

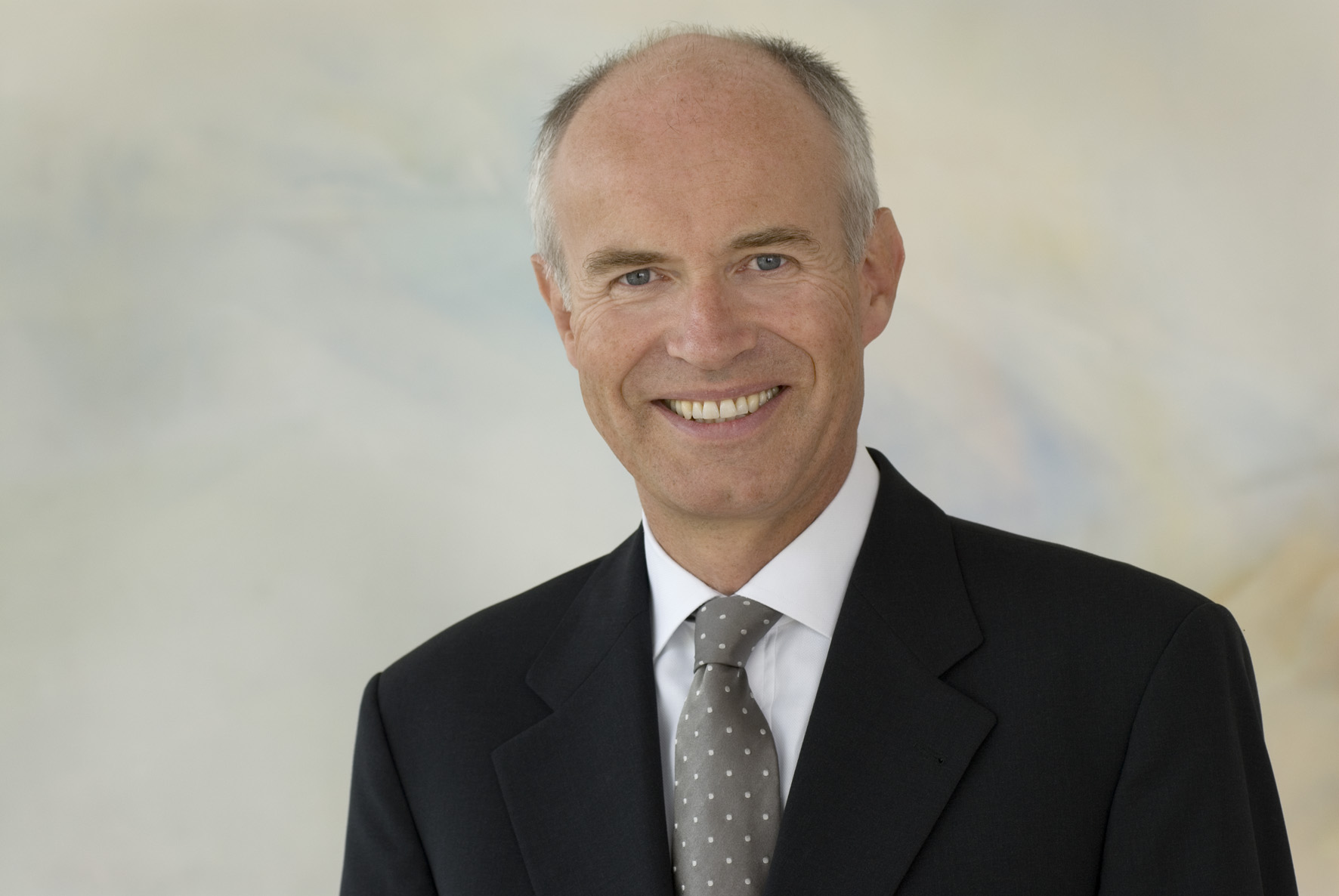
Götz Rehn, CEO and founder of Alnatura

The Alnatura Produktions- und Handels GmbH is a chain of organic food supermarkets and producer of organic food headquartered in Darmstadt, Hesse in Germany. The company was founded in 1984 by Götz Rehn and distributes food and textiles, produced according to ecological aspects, under the trademark Alnatura. The company is based on ideas of the esoteric anthroposophy of Rudolf Steiner, which its founder Götz Rehn was strongly influenced by. The company is like Demeter and others, part of the pseudoscientific anthroposopical community in Germany.

These products are sold both by various drugstore and retail chains as well as the captive organic supermarket chain Alnatura Super Natur Markt. Alnatura currently operates 107 supermarkets in Germany, each with 500 to 800 square meters of retail space, mainly in Baden-Württemberg, Hesse and Rhineland-Palatinate.

Unlike other retail chains, Alnatura does not have a Betriebsrat (engl. employee representative committee/worker's council) for the entire company and its employees were paid below the collective agreement up until 2010.

== History ==
=== Founding ===
The economist Götz Rehn, who still is the CEO today, founded the Alnatura Produktions- und Handels GmbH as a consulting firm under the name Konzeption und Vertrieb natürlicher Lebensmittel Dr. Rehn in Fulda, Hesse in 1984. Initial plans to conceptualize the business as stores for children's clothing made from cotton or a chain of vegetarian self-service restaurants, were discarded. A year later, Alnatura was registered as a word and design trademark. In 1986, the company began selling organic products as a retail format in the grocery stores of tegut and dm drug stores. These cooperations make half of the revenue. The company's first supermarket opened in Mannheim, Baden-Württemberg on October 1, 1987. In 1989, the company moved from Fulda to Bickenbach. Since January 2019, the company is based in Darmstadt.

According to information provided by the company, by 2005 more than half of all leading positions were occupied by women. In the same year, the company received the first prize Nachhaltiger Mittelstand 2004 (engl. sustainable middle class) from the EthikBank, and Rehn was nominated for "Entrepreneur of the Year" by the auditors Ernst & Young. In 2006, the 25th Alnatura supermarket was opened in Cologne.

In 2012, the first Alnatura organic supermarket was opened in Switzerland in collaboration with Migros in Zürich. For this purpose, the Alnatura AG was founded with its headquarters in Zürich. Since then, their trade partner Migros has been marketing Alnatura products in its stores all over Switzerland, and since July 2014 also via LeShop.ch. Alnatura and Migros' newest collaboration consists of setting up 30 new Alnatura branches throughout urban centers across Switzerland. Since 2014, it is also possible to collect Payback points in Germany, whereas in Switzerland Alnatura is part of the Cumulus program.

=== Disagreement between Alnatura and dm since 2014 ===
In 2014, the drugstore chain dm, which until then had been Alnatura's largest sales partner, decided that they would from now on sell organic products of their own brand and hence discontinue many Alnatura products. Alnatura was able to balance this out by opening more stores of their own and becoming partners with the Edeka-Group, dm's rival Müller by Erwin Müller, and by collaborating internationally. The reasoning behind that was a disagreement between the two founders Götz Werner (dm) and Götz Rehn (Alnatura). Because of a cooperation agreement between the two businesses from the 1980s, dm had the right to a say in Alnatura's selection process concerning new sales partners. But after dm discontinued many Alnatura products, Alnatura was no longer compelled to adhere to the contract anymore and Rehn started to look for new sales partners. As a result, dm sued for compliance with the contract at the Landgericht (engl. regional court) in Darmstadt. After a decision in favor of Alnatura, dm appealed. After years of legal disputes, the Oberlandesgericht (engl. Higher Regional Court) in Frankfurt decided in February 2019 that the dismissal of the cooperation agreement in 2014 was effective. Consequently, dm had demanded a total of six million euros from Alnatura. Two million euros had been retained by dm from their legal opinion in 2014, even though Alnatura had already delivered the goods. Alnatura, for their part, demanded payment of the unpaid invoice and in February 2019, the Oberlandesgericht (engl. Higher Regional Court) ruled in their favor.

During a second proceeding brought up by Werner, he demanded trademark rights from Rehn to Alnatura. The case was tried by the Landgericht (engl. regional court) in Frankfurt. The lawsuit, however, was rejected at first, so Werner filed a complaint at the Oberlandesgericht (engl. Higher Regional Court).

=== Development after 2015 ===
Since 2015 the products were delivered through a proper online shop (see E-Commerce) in cooperation with the Delticom subsidiary Gourmondo Food GmbH to the following 19 European countries: Germany, Austria, Italy, Belgium, France, Luxemburg, Netherlands, Portugal, Spain, Romania, Greece, Poland, Bulgaria, Czechia, Slovakia, Ireland, United Kingdom, Denmark, and Sweden. Also since 2015, certain baby products have been available at Windeln.de.

On March 17, 2016, the 100th Alnatura supermarket was opened on Friedrichstraße in Berlin. By November 2018, there were 132 Alnatura supermarkets in 63 cities and about 12,300 stores of the 19 trading partners in 14 European countries.

In 2016, the construction of the new company headquarters on the terrain of the former company Kelley Barracks in the city of Darmstadt were started. According to the company, the building meets the ecological standards and to date is the biggest office building in Europe that has an exterior facade which is completely made from loam. The corporation established a so-called Alnatura Campus, on which amongst others the deli restaurant Tibits opened up a store. The building was opened in January 2019.

In September 2016, the first eggs of the Alnatura Bruderküken-Initiative were regionally delivered; the concept is planned to be applied to more and more stores. The initiative aimed to exclusively offer eggs of hens whose male siblings are raised to be broiler chickens and are not killed when they are still chicks. The same month, Alnatura enabled mobile payments via Payback Pay.

In March 2018, a store of the French chain 'Match' started to sell Alnatura products. The plan was to launch Alnatura products in all Match stores in France by the end of 2019.

In September 2018, it was announced that Alnatura would expand their cooperation with bringmeister.de and would remove single-use plastic bags for fruits and vegetables. Likewise, disposable cups for the selling of drinks are no longer available.

In Oktober 2019, Alnatura and other organic supermarkets in Germany discontinued millet products by the 'Spreewälder Hirsemühle' because the owner is a member of the political party AfD (Alternative for Germany).

In the beginning of 2020, Alnatura closed down its online shop.

== Key figures ==
The company's key figures according to the attested annual financial statements (fiscal year from October 1 until September 30 respectively; annual average of employees including trainees):

	Sales (MM Euro)	Employees	Stores
2005/06	184,9	405	25
2006/07	246,1	528	31
2007/08	305,8	736	40
2008/09	360,5	909	50
2009/10	399,9	1009	53
2010/11	465,1	1369	65
2011/12	517,6	1463	71
2012/13	594,4	1769	80
2013/14	689,8	1901	96
2014/15	759,9	2105	98
2015/16	761,2	2229	107
2016/17	772,9	2526	
2017/18	825,1	2670	126
2018/19	903,5	2837	

== International activity ==
In Germany, other trading partners such as the German retail chain Edeka and the drugstore chain Müller also started cooperating and selling Alnatura's proprietary products.

In Luxembourg, products by Alnatura are distributed by the local supermarket chain Cactus, while in France, the products can be bought in the supermarket chain Match.

In 2012, Alnatura collaborated with the Swiss market chain Migros. In late July 2019, Migros opened the twelfth Alnatura store in Switzerland in the city of Lucerne.

In Austria, like in Germany, Alnatura was mostly marketed by the drugstore chain dm and various reform houses ("Reformhaus") at first. Following the afore mentioned disputes between Alnatura and dm, Alnatura expanded its distribution network in Austria in 2015 to include the supermarket chains Billa and Merkur, which are part of Rewe International, while at the same time dm reduced the range of Alnatura products and focused on corresponding Austrian products via their own brand dmBio, which was launched in 2015.

== Membership and operations ==
Alnatura is part of the IFOAM-Organics International and a member of the Bund Ökologische Lebensmittelgesellschaft (BÖLW; engl. ecological food industry federation).

Since June 2012, Alnatura-markets have been participating in the Payback-Points-Programme.

Alnatura is a sponsor of the "Wir haben es satt!" demonstrations (engl. We are fed up) and supports the demands of the campaign.

Götz Rehn, the founder and director of Alnatura, was greatly influenced by the Anthroposophic movement, instilling its values to the brand. So since 2011, each monthly corporate publication Alnatura Magazine has a special supplement Anthroposophical Perspectives attached, which regularly addresses anthroposophical topics, as for example a series about anthroposophic medicine in 2010.

== Awards ==
The company was featured among the top 3 most sustainable businesses of the National German Sustainability Award in 2009 and 2010. The Award honors Germany's most ecological businesses. In 2011, Alnatura was named "Pioneer of Organic Retail Markets" in first place, and was decorated with the title of Germany's most sustainable business. In 2016, Alnatura received the award for Germany's most sustainable medium-sized company by the jury of the National German Sustainability Award. In 2019, Alnatura was nominated for and featured under the top three of the German Sustainability Award Architecture. At the end of November 2019, the founder and director Götz Rehn accepted German Sustainability Award Architecture. Alnatura convinced "with its extraordinarily holistic quality, which is pioneering and fathoms the opportunities of sustainable constructions".

== Criticism ==
Alnatura, which is not bound to the Collective Agreement Act, announced in April 2010 that they would in the future cash out a minimum amount of payment in correspondence to the collective agreement, as a reaction to the critical news coverage in the media about their below standard range wages. The time for the implementation of the new wages was not specified. This was preceded by a statement of Götz Rehn (founder and managing director), in which Christmas bonuses, holiday pay, capital-forming benefits, contribution to the pension scheme and value-added participation were listed as voluntary benefits, which is why, according to his opinion, the model of agreed wages and the Alnatura payment model are difficult to compare. In July 2010, the company announced that from October 2010, all employees would be paid at least collectively agreed wages. In 2019, Alnatura paid their employees in Berlin stores in correspondence to the agreed wages.

=== Corporate co-determination ===
Out of more than 110 Alnatura stores, only one store, in Freiburg im Breisgau, has a works council. If a second works council is established, all employees from Alnatura would be entitled to a Central Works Council. Hubert Thiermeyer, regional manager of Verdi, criticized in November 2015: "The high level in competence in the quality of goods in the organic trade does not automatically go hand in hand with a competence in social standards."

In 2015, a part of the workforce in a store in Bremen tried to elect a second works council of the company, which was met with resistance from the management. Kai Wargalla, an employee, told Radio Bremen: "The election was prevented by tactical games."

Subsequently, five employees obtained a resolution of the labor court in February 2016, that would allow the appointment of an election committee. A complaint from Alnatura against this resolution was rejected by the Landesarbeitsgericht (engl. Higher labor court) in Bremen in November 2016. However, the company filed a Nichtzulassungsbeschwerde (engl. non-admission-appeal) at the Bundesarbeitsgericht (engl. Federal Labor Court). In the second half of 2016, the Alnatura store located on Faulenstraße in Bremen reduced its staff to 20 employees, thereby also reducing the necessary amount of employees in the works council to one. According to Alnatura, this staff reduction was due to economic factors. Three years later, in February 2019, the Federal Labor Court gave the case back to the Higher labor court in Bremen. Kai Wargalla pointed out that the company stalled for time and that the employees of 2016 engaged in participation were either no longer working at the store or tired of the dispute.

=== Possible consumer fraud ===
In 2017, the NDR consumer magazine Markt tested fresh tortelloni from various producers. Alnatura advertises with "50% stuffing" on the tortelloni packaging. After weighing some of the Alnatura tortellonis, the inspectors detected that the average tortelloni consists of six grams of dough and one gram of stuffing – clearly less than 50%, although twice as much in comparison to the tested competitor. Alnatura wrote: "We assume that this is a sole mistake in the production, which, nevertheless, we take seriously."

== Radio reports ==
- Marktcheck checkt Alnatura: Hochwertige Bio-Produkte zum fairen Preis? (engl. Marktcheck check Alnatura: High-quality organic products at a fair price?), SWR – Marktcheck from July 31, 2018 (YouTube)
- DER BIO-SUPERMARKT ALNATURA, ProSieben – Galileo, Episode 127, Season 2017 from May 11, 2017 (YouTube from June 14, 2017)
