= Viña Matetic =

Chilean vineyard & winery

- Location: Rosario Valley, Chile
- Founded: 1999 (25–26 years ago)
- Key people: Founder: Jorge Matetić Celtinja
- Acres cultivated: 376
- Cases/yr: 44,000
- Known for: Matetic, Corralillo, EQ
- Website: matetic.com; toursandbooking.matetic.com

Viña Matetic is a Chilean vineyard and winery, founded in the Rosario Valley, Valparaíso Region, in 1999, by the fourth generation descendants of Jorge Matetić Celtinja, a Croatian immigrant who arrived in Punta Arenas in 1892. He is considered a pioneer in the country in the adoption of Syrah in cold climatic conditions, and currently, the vineyard highlight for inclusion of ecological agriculture, through the concept of biodynamic agriculture. In 2018, Matetic had 152 hectares of cultivated vine, and annual sales of 44,000 cases of wine. Participant of wine tourism, the company has a restaurant and a boutique hotel, which received a total of 21,000 visitors in 2017.

== Awards and honours ==
National:

- Best vineyard restaurant, for Equilibrio restaurant, in 2017, according to the Chilean Wine Lovers Club.

International:

- Among the 100 best wineries of the year, in 2008, 2011, 2012 and 2014, according to Wine & Spirits magazine.
