= Fattoria La Vialla =

Italian food company

Fattoria La Vialla is a biodynamic farm and winery located in Castiglion Fibocchi, near Arezzo in Tuscany, Italy. It was founded in 1978 by Piero and Giuliana Lo Franco, who formerly worked in textiles. The farm sells its products, such as wine and olive oil, through a direct-to-consumer model. It also operates as an agriturismo, with 29 properties.

== History ==
Fattoria La Vialla was established in 1978 when the Lo Franco family acquired and restored agricultural land and farmhouses above the Arno Valley, replanting olive groves and vineyards.

In 1989 the farm began selling its products directly to the consumer.

In 2005 it became certified biodynamic.

The business is now run by the founders’ three sons, Gianni, Antonio and Bandino Lo Franco.

== Description ==
As of 2025, Fattoria La Vialla has more than 6,000 acres, some of it woodland, and employs 200 people. There is also a shop on site.

Fattoria La Vialla has practised organic farming since its founding. It was certified biodynamic in 2005 and is currently the largest biodynamic farm in Italy.

Biodynamic agriculture is a form of alternative agriculture developed in 1924 by Rudolf Steiner. It treats the farm as a self-contained system and excludes synthetic fertilisers and pesticides. Some aspects of biodynamic practice have been described as pseudoscientific.

Fattoria La Vialla distributes its products directly to consumers rather than through retail intermediaries. According to the Financial Times, approximately 85 per cent of its sales are conducted online.

The company sells its products in several European countries, including the United Kingdom, Germany, the Netherlands, Austria, Belgium and Switzerland. It has a warehouse in Bradford.

== Awards and recognition ==
Fattoria La Vialla has received awards in wine and sustainability competitions, including the Berliner Wine Trophy and Mundus Vini Biofach.

In 2024, it was named Sustainability Pioneer of the Year by the European Natural Beauty Awards.
