= Adam Maurizio =

Adam Maurizio was a Swiss botanist, specialist of food technology and cultural history, born 26 September 1862 in Kraków and died 4 March 1941 in Liebefeld near Bern. He gained international recognition for his works on the history of plant food.

== Biography ==
Adam Maurizio came from a well-known family du canton of Grisons. As did many Swiss citizens in the 19th century, his father emigrated to the Austrian Empire about 1850. He had a confectioner's shop in Kraków. Adam Maurizio was born there in 1862 as a Swiss citizen. He went to the public school in Kraków, but was later excluded due to political problems. From 1883, he resides in Switzerland, where he follows the colleges in Chur and Winterthur. He then studies biological sciences, and particularly botany, from the year 1888 on at the Zürich, Geneva and Bern universities. In 1894, he obtains a thesis of the Bern university on Saprolegnia. At the same time, he obtains his license of secondary teaching.

Once his diplomas obtained, Maurizio taught natural sciences, in several schools. In 1896, he becomes research assistant in plant physiology and pathology at the research station of Wädenswil. He dedicates his researches above all to the raw plant materials, bakery and forages. In his works, he constantly benefited from the support of the Berlinese botanist Ludwig Wittmack, whose assistant he was at a time.

In 1900, Maurizio becomes assistant in botanical research in the research centre of agricultural chemistry in Zürich. With his already published scientific works, he obtained his habilitation in the Zürich university in 1903 and his venia legendi (right to teach) in technical botany. As a Privatdozent, he gave courses and made him known through many conferences on Swiss agriculture.

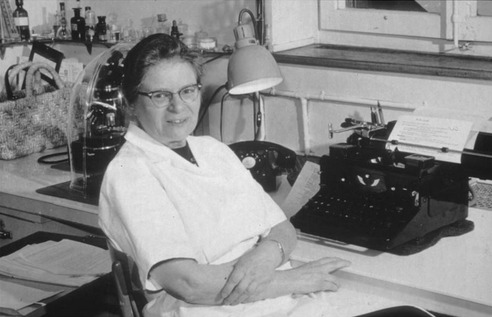
Maurizio's daughter, Anna Maurizio (1960)

In Autumn 1907, Maurizio was nominated professor of botany and plant technology at the High technical school of Lemberg (Lvov), where he worked until his retirement in 1923. He spent his first retirement years in Bromberg (Bydgoszcz). In 1927, he was nominated emeritus professor at the Faculty of pharmacy of the Warsaw university. But he could exercise his teaching duties only in a limited way, as he had eye problems. He came back to Switzerland in 1935, where he lived until his death in Liebefeld near Bern.

Maurizio's daughter, Anna Maurizio (1900–1993), was an internationally recognised researcher in apiculture, who also lived in Liebefeld.

== Research fields ==
Soon after his student times, Maurizio changed orientation, shifting from scientific botany to applied botany. From 1900 on, he focused his research activity on the technology and physiology of cereals and their products. Particularly useful to bakery were his experiment results, when he endeavoured to quantify the evaluation of the suitability of wheat flours to bread-making, which had been empirical for long. The first synthesis of his works was published in 1903 under the title "Getreide, Mehl und Brot" (Paul Parey, Berlin). In 1909 followed "Die Müllerei und Bäckerei " and in 1917/199 his two-volume book "Die Nahrungsmittel aus Getreide" (2nd edition 1924/1926).

His intensive work on the technological aspects of cereal transformation led Maurizio to put more and more emphasis in the historical evolution of food products. In his 1916 book "Die Getreide-Nahrung im Wandel der Zeiten", he describes what had been until then a professional domain with the point of view of cultural history and ethnography. The fruit of many historical researches and field data was his master work, "Die Geschichte unserer Pflanzennahrung von den Urzeiten bis zur Gegenwart", published in 1927. This is the only book translated to French in 1932, with the title Histoire de l'alimentation végétale depuis la préhistoire jusqu'à nos jours. It was never translated to English. This first scientifically based global panorama on world food history gave Maurizio an international reputation as a historian of technology. With his central thesis that each step of agriculture involves a particular form of food system, and with his interdisciplinary point of view, he opened new research lines for ethnography, history and geography of agriculture. One of the best recensions of this book and its signification for agricultural geography was issued by the historian Richard Krzymowski in 1929 in the "Landwirtschaftlichen Jahrbüchern".

Maurizio dedicated his last fifteen years of life entirely to the cultural history of human food.

== Publications ==
- 1894. Zur Entwickelungsgeschichte und Systematik der Saprolegnieen. Diss. phil. Univ. Bern. [The development and systematics of Saprolegnia].
- 1902. Die Backfähigkeit des Weizens und ihre Bestimmung. In: Landwirtschaftliche Jahrbücher, tome 31, pp. 179–234, 3 tableaux. Tiré à part. [Wheat suitability for bread-making and its evaluation].
- 1903. Getreide, Mehl und Brot. Ihre botanischen, chemischen und physikalischen Eigenschaften, hygienisches Verhalten, sowie ihre Beurteilung und Prüfung. Handbuch zum Gebrauche in Laboratorien und zum Selbstunterricht für Chemiker, Müller, Bäcker, Botaniker und Landwirte. Berlin, Paul Parey. [Cereals, flour and bread. Their botanical, chemical and physical characteristics, their nutritional content, as well as their evaluation and analysis. Manual for laboratories and the personal researches of chemists, millers, bakers, botanists and farmers].
- 1908. Kraftfuttermittel. Verlag Jänecke Hannover = Bibliothek der gesamten Landwirtschaft vol. 51. [Energy-rich forages]. on line at the University of Düsseldorf.
- 1909. Die Müllerei und Bäckerei. Hannover, Jänecke. Bibliothek der gesamten Landwirtschaft vol. 41. [Milling and bread-making].
- 1916. Die Getreide-Nahrung im Wandel der Zeiten. Zürich, Orell Füssli. [Cereal food in history].
- 1917-1919. Die Nahrungsmittel aus Getreide. Verlag Paul Parey Berlin, vol. 1, 1917; vol. 2, 1919; 2e ed. ebd. vol. 1, 1924, vol. 2 1926. [The cereal food products].
- 1926. Pożywienie roślinne i rolnicstwo w rozwoju dziejowym [Plant food and agriculture in the course of history]. Varsaw.
- 1927. Die Geschichte unserer Pflanzennahrung von den Urzeiten bis zur Gegenwart. Berlin, Paul Parey. [The history of our plant food from prehistory to our times].
- 1931. Maurizzio (sic) A., Histoire de l'alimentation végétale chez l'Homme. Revue de botanique appliquée et d'agriculture coloniale, 11(115): 159-168. doi : 10.3406/jatba.1931.4968 on line on Persée
- 1932. Histoire de l'alimentation végétale depuis la préhistoire jusqu'à nos jours. Trad. par F. Gidon. Paris, Payot. 664 p. On line version on Pl@ntUse.
- 1933. Geschichte der gegorenen Getränke. Verlag Paul Parey . – Reprint Sändig, Wiesbaden/Vaduz: 1970, 1982 et 1993. [History of fermented drinks].
- 1939. Die pflanzliche Ernährung in Hungerszeiten, auf Grund von eigenen Erfahrungen in Osteuropa. In: Mitteilungen der Berner Naturforschenden Gesellschaft für das Jahr1939. pp. 50–68. [Plant food in times of hunger, on the basis of personal experiments in Eastern Europe].
- 2019. Histoire de l'alimentation végétale depuis la préhistoire jusqu'à nos jours. Trad. par F. Gidon. Préface de Claude Aubert. Introduction et compléments de Michel Chauvet. Reprint of the 1932 edition. Paris, Ulmer (Collection : Vieilles Racines et Jeunes Pousses). 688 p. ISBN 9782841389148

=== Taxonomist ===
The standard author abbreviation Maurizio is used to indicate this person as the author when citing a botanical name.
