= Alla Selawry =

Russian German scientist and theologian (1913–1992)

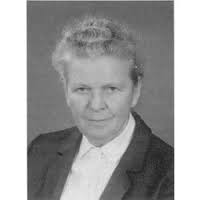
Photo of Alla Selawry

Alla Selawry (Russian: Алла Сергеевна Селаври; 23 August 1913 – 27 July 1992), was a Russian born scientist, Anthroposophist, doctor, homeopath, and theologian.

== Biography ==
She was born in Moscow of Russian parents Sergei Ivanovich Selavri (Russian: Сергей Иванович Селаври), a Sworn Attorney assistant and Antonina Georgievna Stasenkova (Russian: Антонина Георгиевна Стасенкова, a medical doctor; born March 10, 1886, in Stavropol, reposed 11 January 1965 in Stuttgart), and was the older sister of Dr. Oleg Selawry (Russian: Олег Сергеевич Селаври; February 21, 1924 – February 12, 1999). Her family moved from Russia to Germany in 1922 during the Russian Civil War.

She graduated from the University of Tübingen in 1939 with a master's degree in medicine (MD). Shortly after graduating, she worked with Hans Krueger under the guidance of Ehrenfried Pfeiffer to develop Pfeiffer's medical diagnostic technique based on interpreting crystal formations of blood mixed in a copper chloride solution, also known as biocrystallization. She was so successful in this field that she set up a private practice which thrived until her death in 1992. She maintained that blood crystallisation belonged to the "science of the future" based more on intuition than on strictly repeatable, clinical trial studies.

She also developed homeopathic treatment regimens based on certain metals, many of which had properties described in mythological stereotypes (for example, gold, the metal of Apollo, the sun god, was used to treat the heart, the "sun" of the body).

In addition to her contributions to medical science, Selawry wrote a number a theological books, including: Perpetual Prayer of the Heart, a biography of John of Kronstadt, and an unfinished book on virtues and vices.

Selawry died on 27 July 1992 in Stuttgart, Germany, and was survived by her brother Oleg Selawry, and his children Mark and Lubov.

== Publications ==
- (with Oleg Selawry) Die Kupferchlorid-Kristallisation in Naturwissenschaft und Medizin (English: "Copper Chloride Crystallization in Natural Science and Medicine"). Gustav Fischer Verlag, Stuttgart, 1957 (German)
- Zinn und Zinn-Therapie (English: "Tin and Tin-Therapy") Ulm: Haug, 1963 (German)
- Herzensgebet: Ein Weg geistiger Erfahrung; nach Philokaleia (Berg Athos) und Was ist das Jesus-Gebet" (Walaam, Finnland): Ulm: Arkana-Verl. Haug, 1964
- Silber und Silber-Therapie: mit 15 Tabellen (English: "Silver and Silver-Therapy" with 15 tables): Ulm: Haug, 1966 (German)
- Samenkeimung und Metallpotenzen im Kristallisationstest (English: "Seed Germination and Metal Powers in Crystallization") Darmstadt: Verl Research Foundation f. Biol-dynamic farming, 1975
- Das immerwährende Herzensgebet. Ein Weg geistiger Erfahrung (English: "Unceasing Prayer of the Heart." Otto Wilhelm Barth Verlag, München 1970
- Ehrenfried Pfeiffer: Pioneer of Spiritual Research and Practice: A Contribution to his Biography, Mercury Press, 1992.
- Ehrenfried Pfeiffer: Pionier spiritueller Forschung und Praxis: Begegnung und Briefwechsel. Ein Beitrag zu seiner Biographie (Pioniere der Anthroposophie), Philosophisch-Anthroposophischer Verlag am Goetheanum, 1987. ISBN 3-7235-0449-3. (German)
- Johannes von Kronstadt: Starez Rußlands (English: "John of Kronstadt: Spiritual Elder of Russia"). Dornach: Pforte, 1989. ISBN 978-3-85636-064-1. (German)
- O Molitve Iisusovoj / ("On the Jesus Prayer"). Munich: Bratstvo Prep. Iova Počaevskogo, 1990. ISBN 3-926165-20-0. (Russian)
