= Cactus (supermarket) =

Luxembourgish supermarket company

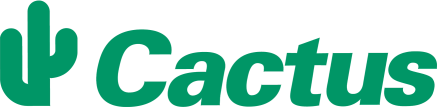

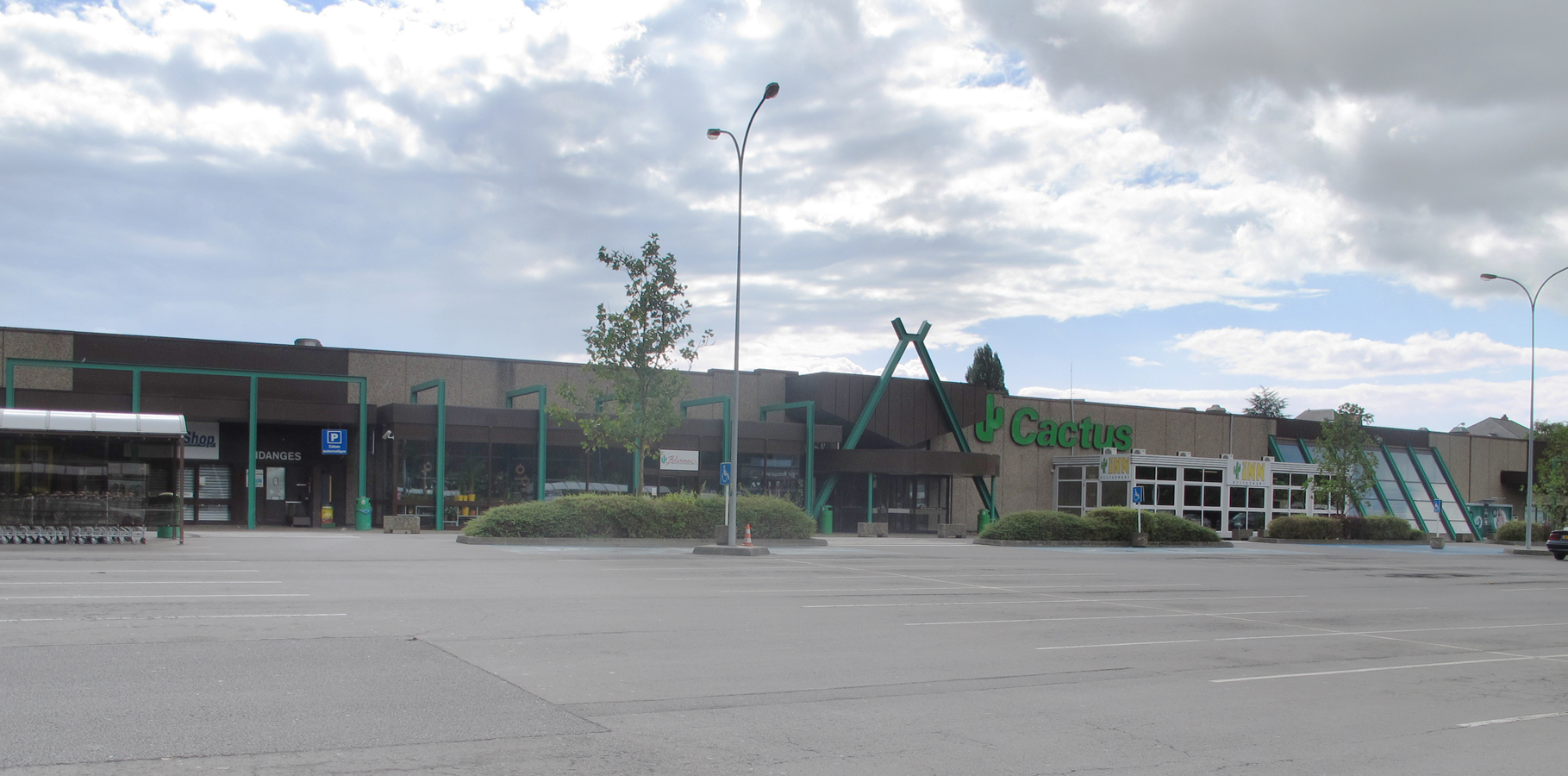
- Cactus store in Esch-sur-Alzette
- Company type: Private
- Industry: Retail
- Founded: 1900
- Headquarters: Bereldange, Luxembourg (head office)
- Key people: Joseph Leesch (Founder), Max Leesch(CEO)
- Services: Supermarkets, hypermarkets, convenience stores, specialist stores
- Number of employees: 4,030 (2017)
- Website: www.cactus.lu

Cactus is a Luxembourgish supermarket chain. The family-run business has stores under the brands Cactus, Supercactus, Cactus marché (Cactus Market) and CactusShoppi. The group also operates speciality shops selling items such as flowers or CDs. As of July 2017, Cactus was Luxembourg's fourth largest employer.

The company logo is a three fingered cactus of green on a white background or sometimes reversed on a green background.

== History ==
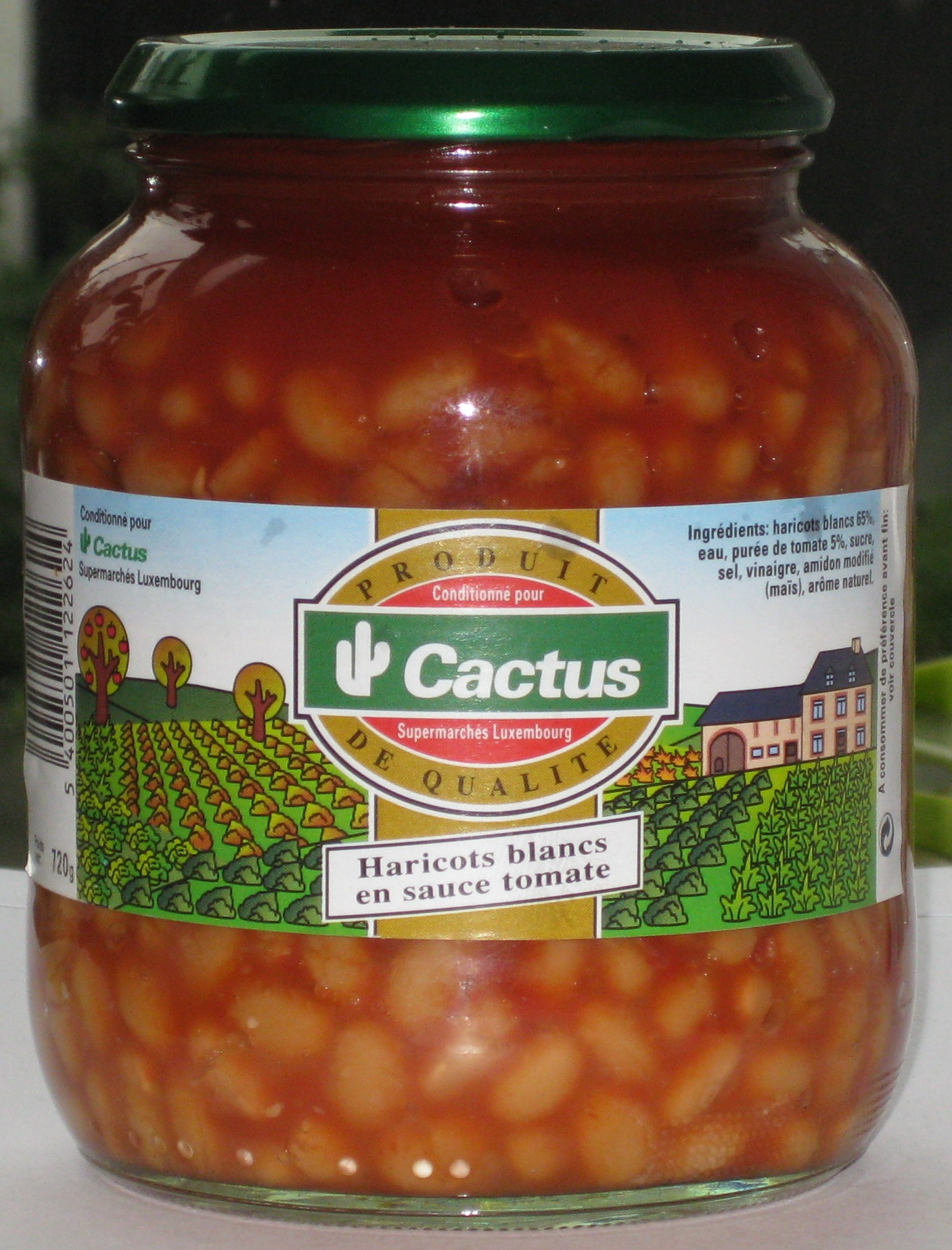
Jar of beans from Cactus, reading "Nemmen dat bescht" (Only the best) in Luxembourgish, and "Produits de Qualité" (Quality Products) in French

In 1900, Joseph Leesch, established a grocery store. In 1905 the business was expanded with his business partner, Michel Donven, to incorporate a "colonial goods wholesaler" importing items such as sugar, tobacco, cocoa, coffee, rice, tea and internationally traded spices. In 1928 the partnership was dissolved and Leesch created a new business, Leesch Frères (Leesch Brothers) with his three sons, Arthur, Jacques and Aloyse. In 1930 Leesch opened a coffee shop on the Rue de Strasbourg in Luxembourg City. In 1955 the business passed to the third generation when the sons of Alfred Leesch, Paul and Alfred, took it over. In 1962 they created the first self-service store, known as the Vivo (Vereinigte Internationale Verkaufs-Organisation). A coffee shop was added in 1966.

The first Cactus supermarket opened on 19 October 1967 in Bereldange. The name Cactus was taken by Paul Leesch from the title of a 1966 Jacques Dutronc song. A year later a second Cactus store opened at Esch-sur-Alzette on the site of a former cinema in the Brill district of the town, and a second Esch store opened the year after that.

1974 saw the company open its first shopping mall, the Belle Etoile in Bertrange, on the main road (subsequently complemented by a parallel motorway) linking Luxembourg and Belgium. The project initially came in LUF 100 million over budget which threatened prematurely to end it, but the developers were persuaded to accept a lower price which enabled the Belle Etoile to be saved.

New stores opened in the late 1970s in Remich, Mersch and Pétange, with further store openings elsewhere in Luxembourg subsequently.

The company's first butchers shop opened under the name Schnékert in 1979. Ten years later, in 1989, the Inn restaurant was opened at the flagship Belle Etoile shopping mall, and in the 1990s the company expanded into DIY and home improvement retailing, opening major DIY stores in Howald, Diekirch and Esch called « Cactus Hobby »

In 2001 Paul Leesch retired from the top job and was succeeded by his son, Max Leesch.

In 2009 the company joined Europe's major supermarkets in launching its own fidelity card scheme.

In 2006 the company reported a turnover of €750 Million. In the same year, it was the country's second largest free sector employer, with 3,950 on the payroll, exceeded in this respect only by ArcelorMittal.

In 2008, a number of smaller local Cactus Shoppi were opened, first in connection with filling stations, then in the following years also on independent sites.

In 2016, Cactus was Luxembourg's third largest employer with 4,060 staff, following Post Groupe Luxembourg (4,320) and ArcelorMittal (4,180)
