= Helfenterbruck =

Forest in Luxembourg

Coordinates: 49°36′13.8″N 06°04′41.1″E

Helfenterbruck is the name of a forest and upscale semi-rural neighborhood in Bertrange, Luxembourg, which in turn is a suburb of Luxembourg City, Luxembourg.

The housing of the neighborhood is a mix of townhouses, small apartment towers, and large single-family houses on relatively small lots. Transportation into downtown Luxembourg takes about 15 minutes via the city bus system. The major road into and out of the neighborhood is Route de Longwy.
