= Wild farming =

Wild farming is a growing alternative to "factory farming" that consists of planting crops that are highly associated and supportive to the natural ecosystem. This includes intercropping with native plants, following the contours and geography of the land, and supporting local food chains. The goal is to produce large crop yields, while still promoting a healthy environment. Wild farming is a backlash against the dominance of factory farming which is a dominant factor in the food industry and has a 'myth' that industrial agriculture is more efficient. Up until the mid 20th century, agricultural crop yields relied on natural inputs such as rainfall patterns, natural soil resources, recycling of organic matter, and built-in biological control mechanisms. Currently, agricultural practices have been conventionalized to include large monocropped fields and the use of synthetic pesticides and fertilizers. Avoiding the conventional farming practices, wild farming adopts many practices from sustainable agricultural systems such as agroecology, permaculture, forest farming, and greywater systems.

== Principles ==
The four basic guiding principles of the wild farming movement are:

1. Direct managers to develop long-term vision for future of landscape
2. Basic recognition of ecosystem processes.
3. High value on biological diversity.
4. To consider the quality of life of the community as well as the self.

== Organizations ==
The largest organization involved in the study and promotion of wild farming is the Wild Farm Alliance (WFA). The objective of the WFA is to implement a vision of a “healthy, viable agriculture that helps protect and restore wild Nature”. The WFA has created a platform that other farmers, farming organizations, and conservation groups can adhere to. The WFA fights for the rights of the small-scale farmer who does not rely on the techniques of factory farming. Their platform has been endorsed by 74 organizations across the U.S., and the types of organizations include communities of sustainable farmers, California Certified Organic Farmers Foundation, conservation groups, advocacy groups, and suppliers of organic/sustainable food. The WFA helps spread education by sharing success stories of farmers around the nation. For example, the WFA website contained a story of a farmer in Belgrade, MT who was raising sheep. To protect the flock from predators like wolves, they raised a guard llama with the sheep; because the llama grew up with the sheep they bonded and the llama protected them from native predators.

== See also ==
- Local food
- Locavore
- Biodynamic farming
