= The Biodynamic Association =

The Biodynamic Association (formerly the Biodynamic Farming & Gardening Association, then the North American Biodynamic Association) is a United States–based company that promotes Biodynamic agriculture system through educational and research programs and has headquarters in Milwaukee, Wisconsin.

== History ==
Biodynamic agriculture was inaugurated in 1924 by Austrian scientist Rudolf Steiner. It is the oldest, non-chemical agricultural movement and pre-dates organic agriculture by some twenty years. Beginning in 1926, American farmers and gardeners joined the effort to test and promulgate Steiner's agricultural ideas. By 1938 there were 39 Americans who had joined this international effort, with some reading Steiner's work in the English translation and others in the German original.

The Association was formed in 1938 in New York state with the support of Ehrenfried Pfeiffer, a disciple of Rudolf Steiner, when he immigrated to the U.S. It is organized as a 501(c)(3) non-profit organization.

== Purpose ==
The Association is a non-profit, membership organization and is open to the public. It has an educational focus and conducts conferences, workshops and seminars; publishes books and a quarterly journal, Biodynamics; and supports regional, grass-roots membership groups. It provides several booklets with specific instructions on biodynamic methods, including the biodynamic preparations and composting.

== See also ==
- Wild Farm Alliance
- Electrical energy efficiency on United States farms
