= Ehrenfried Pfeiffer =

German soil scientist

Ehrenfried Erwin Pfeiffer
- Born: 19 February 1899; Munich, Germany
- Died: 30 November 1961; Spring Valley, New York, U.S.
- Occupation: Soil scientist

Ehrenfried Erwin Pfeiffer (19 February 1899 – 30 November 1961) was a German scientist, soil scientist, leading advocate of biodynamic agriculture, anthroposophist and student of Rudolf Steiner.

== Life ==
Ehrenfried Pfeiffer began work with Rudolf Steiner in 1920 to develop and install special diffuse stage lighting for eurythmy performances on the stage of the first Goetheanum. After Steiner's death in 1925, Pfeiffer worked in the private research laboratory at the Goetheanum in Dornach, (Switzerland). He became manager and director of the 800-acre (3.2 km^{2}) experimental biodynamic Loverendale farm in Domburg in the Netherlands. This farm was set up to carry out some of the agricultural studies of the Goetheanum laboratory. The work of testing and developing Rudolf Steiner's Agriculture Course of 1924 was an international enterprise coordinated by Pfeiffer at the Natural Science Section of the Goetheanum. Pfeiffer’s most influential book 'Bio-Dynamic Farming and Gardening' was published in 1938 simultaneously in at least five languages, English, German, Dutch, French, and Italian. The following year, and just months before the outbreak of World War II, Pfeiffer ran Britain's first biodynamics conference, the Betteshanger Summer School and Conference, at the estate of Lord Northbourne in Kent. Pfeiffer's Betteshanger Conference is regarded as the 'missing link' between biodynamic agriculture and organic farming because the following year (1940) its host, Lord Northbourne, published his manifesto of organic farming 'Look to the Land' in which he coined the term 'organic farming'.

Pfeiffer first visited the U.S. in 1933 to lecture to a group of anthroposophists at the Threefold Farm in Spring Valley, New York on biodynamic farming. His consulting was essential to the development of biodynamic agriculture in the U.S.

Pfeiffer developed an analytical method using copper chloride crystallization and used this technique as a blood test for detecting cancer. As a result, Pfeiffer was invited to the U.S. in 1937 to work at the Hahnemann Medical College in Philadelphia While in the U.S., he continued to consult with those interested in biodynamic farming and helped to form the Biodynamic Farming & Gardening Association in 1938. in 1940 he immigrated to the U.S. from Switzerland with his wife Adelheid, escaping the advance of German troops into France. They brought with them their son Christoph and daughter Wiltraud.

With the advent of World War II in Europe, Pfeiffer took his family to Kimberton, Pennsylvania (near Philadelphia), where Alaric Myrin offered Pfeiffer the opportunity to create a model biodynamic farm and training program. Starting in the late 1930s he taught biodynamic farming and gardening at the Kimberton Farm School. One of his students, Paul Keene, who worked and studied with Pfeiffer there for two years and shortly thereafter co-founded Walnut Acres, recalls: "he helped bring all of life together for us in a definite coherent pattern".

While at Kimberton, Pfeiffer led the initiative to found the Biodynamic Farming and Gardening Association, and to start its journal. While at Kimberton, Pfeiffer also met J. I. Rodale, founder of Organic Gardening and Farming magazine, and of the organic movement in the U.S. This relationship gave biodynamics a little-known place in the history of the American organic movement. Interpersonal difficulties - a motif of Pfeiffer's life - brought to a close the Kimberton Farms chapter.

Aiming to continue his work training biodynamic farmers, Pfeiffer bought a farm in Chester, New York, where a small colony arose focused on farming, education, and the administration of the Biodynamic Association.

His copper chloride sensitive crystallization theory brought him an honorary degree of Doctor of Medicine from Hahnemann Medical College and Hospital in Philadelphia in 1939. He studied chemistry and became a professor of nutrition in 1956. Pfeiffer wrote on the dangers of pesticides and DDT and Rachel Carson consulted with him when she was writing Silent Spring.

In 1961, at his home in Spring Valley, N.Y., he suffered from a series of heart attacks, lingering for several days, but ultimately was not given the proper medical care and died. His wife subsequently took over the operation of their farm in Chester, New York.

== Work ==
Pfeiffer was a pioneer of biodynamic agriculture in Europe, Britain, and America. He is most widely known for his innovative work in composting. He conducted extensive research on the preparation and use of biodynamic compost and was the inventor of BD Compost Starter, a compost inoculant. For many years Pfeiffer served as a compost consultant to municipal compost facilities, most notably Oakland, California, as well as countries in the Caribbean, Europe, and the Far East. A technical difficulty with the resulting compost, that it would not spread readily with the commonly used fertilizer spreader, could not be overcome and the project ultimately failed.

Pfeiffer invented two anthroposophic Image forming methods, a method using a round filter chromatography (circular chromatography or chroma test) and the copper chloride crystallization method, developed together with Erika Sabarth. In the latter method, a solution of copper chloride and the test solution is allowed to evaporate. The pattern of the copper chloride crystals can be "read" based on the patterns of known samples. Similarly, the patterns of the circular chromatographs can be "read" based on known samples. Both methods require much practice to "read" and interpret the images.

== Honorary degree ==
Pfeiffer's work at Hahnemann earned him an honorary Doctor of Medicine (M.D.) degree from Hahnemann Medical College and Hospital of Philadelphia on June 8, 1939, at its 91st commencement ceremony.

== Books and articles by Ehrenfried Pfeiffer ==
=== Biodynamics in farming and gardening ===
- Ehrenfried Pfeiffer, Soil Fertility, Renewal and Preservation: Bio-Dynamic Farming and Gardening, Asiatic Publishing House, 2006. ISBN 81-87067-73-X.
- ————, Bio-Dynamic Gardening and Farming: Articles, Mercury Press, 1983-1984. ISBN 0-936132-67-1.
- ————, Using the Bio-Dynamic Compost Preparations & Sprays in Garden, Orchard & Farm, Biodynamic Farming & Gardening Association, 1984. ISBN 0-938250-26-4.
- Ehrenfried Pfeiffer and Erika Riese, Grow a Garden and Be Self-Sufficient, Mercury Press, 1981. ISBN 0-936132-37-X.
- ————, Bio-Dynamics: Three Introductory Articles, Charter, 1999. ASIN B000PIZ250.
- ————, The Biodynamic Treatment of Fruit Trees, Berries and Shrubs, Biodynamic Farming & Gardening Association, 1976.
- ————, Weeds and What They Tell, Biodynamic Farming & Gardening Association, 1981. ASIN B00071HRSU.
- ————, The Earth's Face: Landscape and Its Relation to the Health of the Soil, Faber and Faber, 1947. ASIN B0007IXST0.
- ————, Practical Guide to the Use of the Bio-Dynamic Preparations, Rudolf Steiner Publishing, 1945. ASIN B0007K8FAU.
- ————, The Fair Garden Plot: Concise Guidance for Growing One's Own Vegetables, Rudolf Steiner Publishing, 1945. ASIN B0007KD2GC.

=== Chromatography ===
- ————, Chromatography Applied to Quality Testing, Biodynamic Farming & Gardening Association, 1984.
- ————, Sensitive Crystallization Processes: A Demonstration of Formative Forces in the Blood, Anthroposophic Press, 1975. ASIN B00073467S.

=== Composting ===
- ————, The Art and Science of Composting: Observations and Testing Methods: The Chromatographic Method, Biodynamic Farming & Gardening Association, 1959. ASIN B0007HK7MC.
- ————, The Compost Manufacturers Manual: The Practice of Large Scale Composting, Pfeiffer Foundation, 1956. ASIN B0007G1MWC.

=== Other topics ===
- ————, Heart Lectures: Three Lectures, Mercury Press, 1982. ISBN 0-936132-49-3.
- ————, The Chymical Wedding of Christian Rosenkreutz: A Commentary, Mercury Press, 1984. ISBN 0-936132-16-7.
- ————, Zarathustrian Way, St. George Book Service, 1982. ISBN 0-936132-45-0.
- ————, On Rudolf Steiner's Mystery Dramas, Four Lectures Given in Spring Valley, 1948. Mercury Press, ISBN 0-936132-93-0

== See also ==
- Biodynamic Farming & Gardening Association
- Biodynamic Agriculture
- Demeter International

== Biographical resources ==
- Ehrenfried Pfeiffer, Ein Leben fur den Geist: Ehrenfried Pfeiffer (1899-1961): Pfeiffers autobiographische Erinnerungen, Aufzeichnungen zur Atherforschung und Ernahrung, zur ... Briefe und Aufzeichnungen aus dem Nachlass, Perseus-Verlag, 2000. ISBN 3-907564-31-6. (German)
- Henry Barnes, Into the Heart's Land: A century of Rudolf Steiner's work in North America, SteinerBooks, 2005. ISBN 0-88010-554-2, Chapter 19.
- Kevin T. Dann, Across the Great Border Fault: The naturalist myth in America, Rutgers University Press, 2000, ISBN 0-8135-2790-2.
- Alla Selawry, Ehrenfried Pfeiffer: Pioneer of spiritual research and practice: A contribution to his biography, Mercury Press, 1992.
- Alla Selawry, Ehrenfried Pfeiffer: Pionier spiritueller Forschung und Praxis: Begegnung und Briefwechsel: ein Beitrag zu seiner Biographie (Pioniere der Anthroposophie), Philosophisch-Anthroposophischer Verlag am Goetheanum, 1987. ISBN 3-7235-0449-3. (German)
