= Migros Online =

- Type: Public
- Industry: Retail, ecommerce, online shopping
- Founded: 1997; 29 years ago
- Headquarters: Ecublens, Switzerland
- Key people: Katrin Tschannen (CEO)
- Revenue: 190 million CHF (2019)
- Number of employees: 550
- Website: www.migros.ch/en

Migros Online (formerly LeShop.ch) is a Swiss Market leader among online supermarkets and a subsidiary of the Migros Genossenschafts-Bund (MGB), the largest retailer in Switzerland.

== Company ==
The company is headquartered in Ecublens (VD) with four logistics centers in Ecublens (VD), Bremgarten (AG), Nebikon (LU) and Cheseau (VD). In 2019, the company posted sales of 190 million francs and employed 304 people. Since 1 January 2006, Migros Online has been a subsidiary of the Federation of Migros Cooperatives (MGB).

== History ==
=== 1997 to 2003 ===
October 1997: LeShop SA was founded by young entrepreneurs Alain Nicod, Jesús Martín García, Rémi Walbaum, and Christian Wanner. It went online in April 1998 as Switzerland's first online supermarket. In June 2000, subsidiaries were founded in Germany and Argentina, but both were closed down at a later date.

August 2001: Switzerland's first e-commerce logistics centre, planned and executed by LeShop.ch, began operating in Bremgarten, Aargau.

December 2002: The Bon appétit Group, a majority shareholder of LeShop SA since October 2002, decided to refocus on its core business and announced the closure of LeShop.ch at the end of that month.

January 2003: LeShop.ch was saved when the investment group ShoppingNet Holding SA, together with the company's management acquired the LeShop.ch from the Bon appétit Group.

September 2003: Official announcement of the strategic partnership with Migros, initially without the financial participation by the Federation of Migros Cooperatives (Migros-Genossenschafts-Bund, MGB).

=== 2004: Takeover ===
January 2004: When Migros closed down its own migros-shop.ch website, LeShop.ch took over the Migros product range as well as its customers.

=== 2005 to 2012 ===
In April 2006, LeShop.ch ended the first quarter of 2006 with the company's first-ever operating profit. The Federation of Migros Cooperatives acquired an 80% share in LeShop SA, launching an investment programme for future development. In October 2006, the second LeShop.ch logistics centre was inaugurated by the then Trade Minister and Swiss Federal Councillor Doris Leuthard in Ecublens. The company's headquarters were also transferred to Ecublens, Vaud. After ten years’ trading, LeShop.ch exceeded the turnover benchmark of CHF 100 million in November 2008. In June 2009, LeShop.ch introduced the home delivery of frozen foods and developed a reusable cool box containing dry ice. An iPhone app was launched in January 2010. Cooperation with discount supermarket chain Denner, another subsidiary of Migros, began in August 2011, allowing customers to buy a range of popular Denner wines at LeShop.ch In December 2011, LeShop.ch broke even, becoming one of the world's first profitable pure players in the online grocery business. In July 2012, a special iPad app was launched. By April 2013, one in every three orders was being placed via iPad or iPhone, showing that mobile internet had established itself as a strong growth factor.

=== 2013 to 2020 ===
The first LeShop.ch DRIVE was opened in October 2012. The concept of on-location stocking with orders possible up to two hours before the collection of the goods was an innovation in the Swiss market. In 2013, Dominique Locher succeeded Christian Wanner as CEO. Under his leadership, the first PickMup pick-up locations opened in 2015. LeShop.ch planned to open a second DRIVE location in Staufen, Aargau, in the second half of 2014.

LeShop.ch ended 2013 with uninterrupted growth and a 6% or CHF 9 million increase in turnover to CHF 158.1. LeShop.ch increased sales by CHF 7 million to CHF 165 million in 2014.

According to media reports, the opening of a second pilot DRIVE site, located in Staufen, Canton of Aargau (Switzerland) in September 2014, got off to a good start. For the first time, the online supermarket is now available for the whole central region of German-speaking Switzerland. Also since 2014, about 300 eco-friendly Alnatura products can be ordered on LeShop.ch – the only Swiss supplier of this collection.

The trial launch of the pilot RAIL project with Swiss Federal Railways SBB was completed in 2014. The findings and experiences were incorporated into the project's further development.

These innovations already led to positive business results in 2014. LeShop.ch continued to grow, with online sales of groceries reaching CHF 165 million. This is CHF 7 million or 4.4% more than the previous year. "The online business is growing at an above-average rate".

In 2015, sales at the online supermarket grew by 6.6% to a total of CHF 176 million. The number of employees grew to 308. The same year LeShop.ch began a pilot scheme involving eleven "PickMup collection points", allowing online customers to collect their pre-packed groceries the day after placing their orders. Income statement figures have so far not been published.

In early 2017, LeShop.ch introduced in-car delivery together with Volvo and Swiss Post.

In November 2020 LeShop.ch changed its name to Migros Online.

== Management and administration ==
At the end of September 2013, co-founder Christian Wanner handed over his responsibilities as CEO to Dominique Locher, who had been Sales and Marketing Director since 2000. The former Director of Finances and Human Resources, Sacha Herrmann, was appointed Chief Operating Officer and continued to support the Board in his new function. Christian Wanner remained on as a member of the Board of Directors.

Urs Schumacher took over the management of LeShop.ch as CEO on 1 August 2017, replacing Dominique Locher. COO Sacha Herrmann left the online supermarket at the end of September 2017. The search for a suitable successor was initiated. In October 2017, founder Christian Wanner also left the company. He was replaced as a director by Digitec co-founder Florian Teuteberg. Katrin Tschannen took over the management of LeShop and "Migros Food Online" as CEO on 1 March 2020.
