= Anna Maurizio =

Swiss botanist (1900–1993)

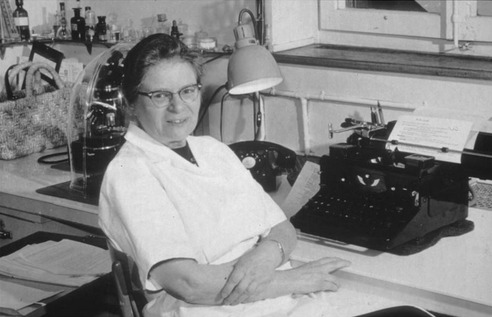
- Anna Maurizio in the Bee Research Centre in Liebefeld ca 1960
- Born: 26 November 1900
- Died: 24 July 1993 (aged 92)
- Known for: studies of bees
- Scientific career
- Fields: biology

Anna Maurizio (26 November 1900 – 24 July 1993) was a Swiss biologist who studied bees. She worked for more than three decades in the Department of Bees at the Liebefeld Federal Dairy Industry and Bacteriological Institute, where she developed new methods for determining the amount of pollen in honey.

== Life ==
Maurizio was born in Zurich, the daughter of botanist and cultural historian Adam Maurizio. She studied at a gymnasium in Lviv, then graduated from the high school of agriculture in Dubliany (near Lviv) in 1923, and then in biology in 1927 in Lviv. She began work at the Federal Station of Dairy and Bacteriology in Liebefeld-Bern in 1928 and retired in 1966. She died in Switzerland, at the age of 92.

== Works ==
- Zur Biologie und Systematik der Pomaceen bewohnenden Podosphaeren. Diss. Univ. Bern 1927.
- Beobachtungen über die Lebensdauer und den Futterverbrauch gefangen gehaltener Bienen. Beitrag zur Methodik von Fütterungsversuchen. Mit statistischer Auswertung von A. Linder. Schweizerische Bienen-Zeitung 1946, Beiheft; H. 13 - Bd. 2.
- Pollenanalytische Untersuchungen an Honig und Pollenhöschen. Schweizerische Bienen-Zeitung 1949, Beiheft; H. 18 = Bd. 2.
- Weitere Untersuchungen an Pollenhöschen. Beitrag zur Erfassung der Pollentrachtverhältnisse in verschiedenen Gegenden der Schweiz. Schweizerische Bienen-Zeitung 1953, Beiheft; H. 20 = Bd. 2.
- Blüte, Nektar, Pollen, Honig. Verlag der Deutschen Bienenwirtschaft München 1960.
- Werner Kloft, Anna Maurizio und Walter Kaeser: Das Waldhonigbuch. Herkunft und Eigenschaften des Waldhonigs. Ehrenwirth Verlag München 1965; 2. erg. u. erw. Aufl. unter Mitarbeit von A. Fossel unter dem Titel Waldtracht und Waldhonig in der Imkerei. Herkunft, Gewinnung und Eigenschaften des Waldhonigs. Ebd. 1985.
- Anna Maurizio und Ina Grafl: Das Trachtenpflanzenbuch. Nektar und Pollen - die wichtigsten Nahrungsquellen der Honigbiene. Ehrenwirth Verlag München 1969; 2. Aufl. 1980; 3. Aufl. 1982; 4. überarbeitete und wesentlich erweiterte Aufl. von Anna Maurizio und Friedgard Schaper, ebd. 1994.
- Der Honig. Herkunft, Gewinnung, Eigenschaften und Untersuchung des Honigs. Erste Auflage 1927 von Enoch Zander und Albert Koch. Völlig neu bearbeitet von Anna Maurizio. Handbuch der Bienenkunde in Einzeldarstellungen, 2. Aufl., Bd. 6, Verlag Eugen Ulmer Stuttgart 1975.

== Literature ==
- Otto Morgenthaler: Zum Rücktritt von Dr. Anna Maurizio. In: Zeitschrift für Bienenforschung, Bd. 8 (1965/66), Heft 5, pp. 130–140, (with publication list and photos on p. 129).
- Joachim Evenius: Dr. Maurizios Verdienste um die praktische Bienenzucht. In: Zeitschrift für Bienenforschung, Bd. 8 (1965/66), Heft 5, pp. 141–142.
- Jean Louveaux: In memoriam. Anna Maurizio (1900-1993). In: Apidologie, Bd. 24 (1993), p. 536, (in French).
- Peter Fluri und Jean-Daniel Charrière: Anna Maurizio, Pionierin der Bienenbotanik, würde 100-jährig. In: Schweizerische Bienenzeitung Jg. 123 (2000), Heft 11, p. 660–661, (includes photographs).
- Irmgard Jung-Hoffmann: Frauen und andere Merkwürdigkeiten. In: Deutsches Bienen-Journal, Jg. 16 (2008), Heft 7, p. 308–309, (a short biography, with photos).
