= La Belle Etoile =

Shopping mall in Bertrange, Luxembourg

Coordinates: 49°37′25″N 06°03′04″E

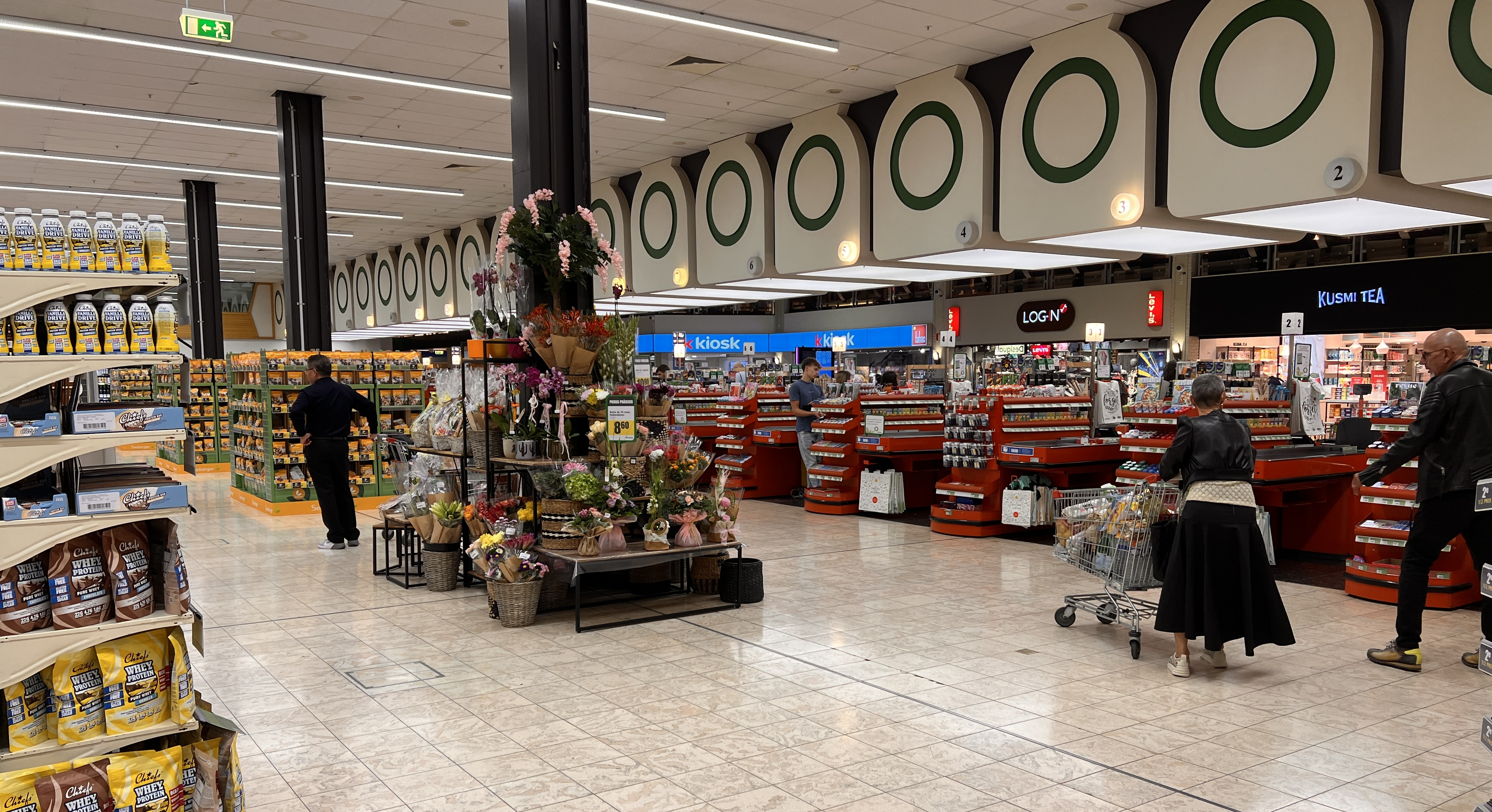
Cash registers at Cactus supermarket in La Belle Étoile

La Belle Etoile is a shopping mall in Bertrange, in south-western Luxembourg. It is owned by Cactus, Luxembourg's largest retailer and third-largest employer.

It is located on the route d'Arlon (N6), 6 kilometres (3.7 mi) to the west of Luxembourg City, next to the village of Tossenberg.

The centre is home to 65 stores, making it Luxembourg's largest shopping centre. The anchor store of the complex is a Cactus hypermarket. Other well-known tenants include Benetton, The Body Shop, C&A, and H&M. The centre has parking for 3,000 cars.
