= Wild Farm Alliance =

Non-profit organization

The Wild Farm Alliance (WFA) is a non-profit organization dedicated to increasing biodiversity by expanding the idea and practice of wild farming.

Rooted in Watsonville, the heart of central California's agricultural lands, the WFA was founded in 2000, and was a participant in the sustainable agriculture movement. With twelve board members and a panel of advisors, including notorious agrarian Wendell Berry, the Wild Farm Alliance is composed of agricultural intellects from across the country. Furthermore, this panel of agricultural experts participates in educational meetings and conferences that encourage conservation and sustainable agriculture, as well as shape and implement the practices and beliefs of the WFA. The Wild Farm Alliance is also responsible for promoting private and public conservation incentives that compensate farmers for their stewardship efforts. Advocates of organic agriculture the WFA claims that organic farming (when done right) is a great model for farmers, but organic farming should also include the expansion and conservation of Nature on the farm. Since 37% of the Earth's land is dedicated to agriculture, the WFA believes that farmlands should be the first focus area for wildlife conservation (International Federation of Organic Movements-2002.).

As eco-crates and part of the stewardship school, the WFA's mission is to "promote agriculture that helps to protect and restore wild Nature." Furthermore, they envision a "world in which community-based, ecologically managed farms and ranches seamlessly integrate into landscapes that accommodate the full range of native species and ecological processes". Reiterating these ideas, the WFA defines sustainable agriculture as biological conservation, as well as, the interconnection between nature, the community, and the farm.

== WFA Platform ==
Recognizing that:

1. • The current rate of species extinction signifies an unprecedented biodiversity crisis.
2. • Conventional/industrial farming is a devastating threat to sustainable family-scale farms and to biodiversity.
3. • Interconnected and protected wildlands are essential to increasing biodiversity and sustaining healthy rural landscapes.

Believe that:

1. • Agriculture must be conducted in ways that promote and protect native plants and animals.
2. • Sustainable family farms and ranches nourish healthy human communities and safeguard natural communities.
3. • A new conservation ethic is in order to overcome the current biodiversity crisis

=== Methods and practices ===
Combining an array of different ecological restoration and conservation strategies the Wild Farm Alliance calls their ideal sustainable model a "wildfarm." Wild farms come in many shapes and sizes, ranging from minimal wildness to those that are "seamlessly integrated into the larger landscape. The most common element is their ability to accommodate wild Nature." In order to increase wilderness on the farm, farmers apply biologically stimulating practices such as the use of hedgerows, riparian restoration, watershed conservation, incorporation of native flora and fauna, control of invasive species, as well as many others.

Hedgerows:

A hedgerow is defined as a fence or barrier formed by a dense row of shrubs or low trees, which provides protection against erosion, and acts as a barricade confining livestock. Using hedgerows to outline agricultural fields, farmers can benefit from the shrubs promotion of native pollinators and predatory insects which reduce pest outbreaks, thus reducing the financial burden of purchasing expensive pesticides. Attracting native pollinators like sweat bees also aid the farmer financially because bees contribute to an estimated $40 billion in orchard, row, and pasture business. (Shepherd et al.-2003.) Hedgerows are also valuable as wildlife movement corridors, which allow insects and animals to move or migrate easier across farmlands. They do this by connecting wildernesses and farmlands together, thus expanding the wild landscape and habitat region of local native species.

Riparian Restoration:

Riparian zones and the watershed are valuable and sensitive components of the farm ecosystem, that should be protected from erosion, water contamination, and other ecologically devastating processes. Some methods for protecting these areas include restoration of native plants to prevent erosion and promote biodiversity, as well as, fencing off fragile riparian environments from livestock to reduce erosion and trampling of native plants. By protecting these areas from erosion, cattle disturbance, and water contamination, farmers can benefit from an increase in biodiversity and from a variety of nature's services: "nutrient cycling, erosion control, water purification, and flood protection".

== See also ==
- Biodynamic Farming & Gardening Association
