= Bertrange =

Bertrange Bartreng (Luxembourgish) Bartringen (German)
- Commune
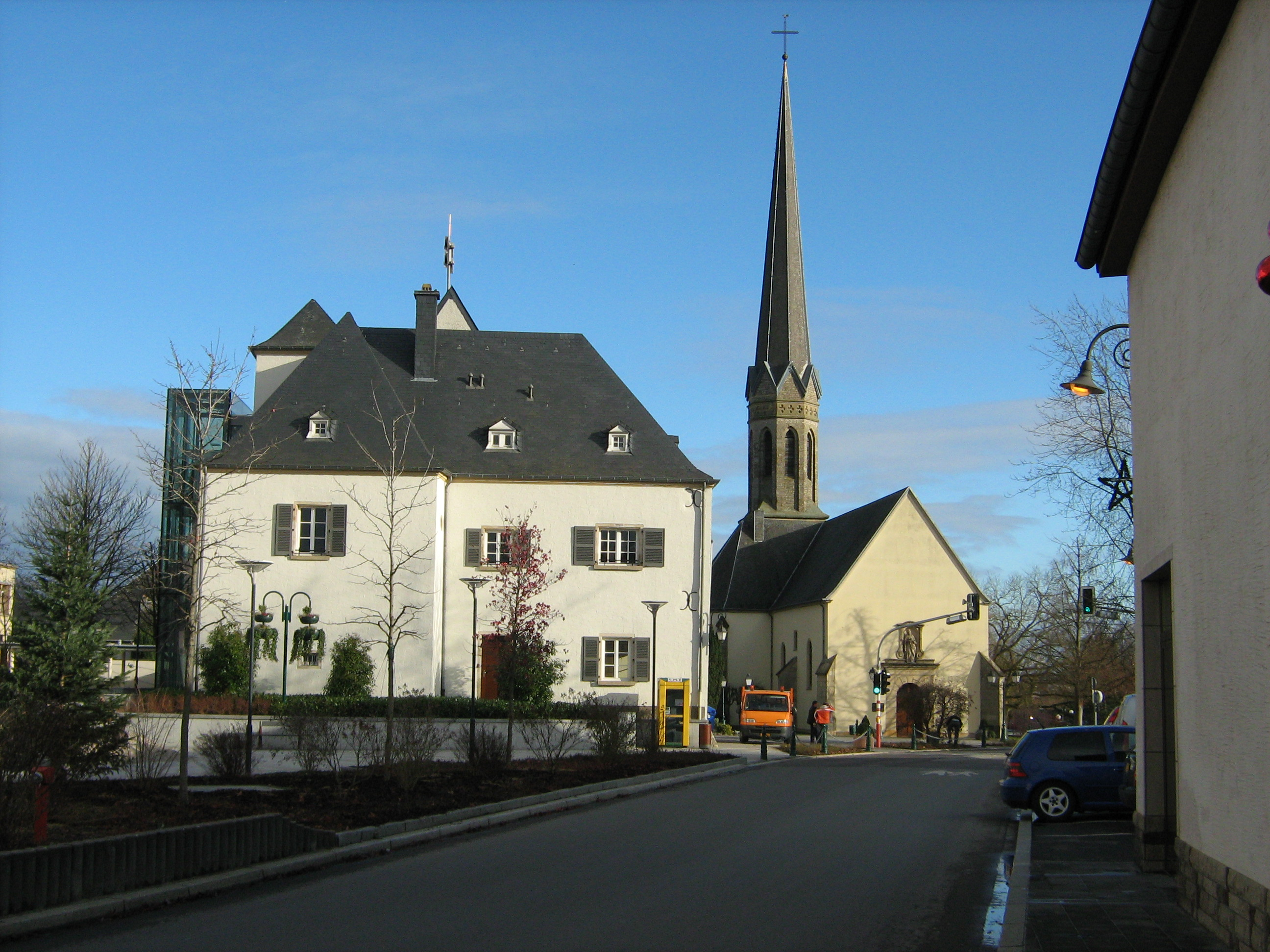

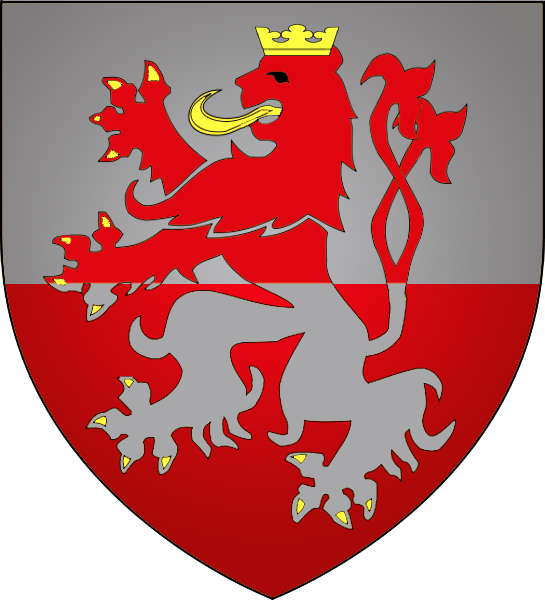
- Coat of arms

- Map of Luxembourg with Bertrange highlighted in orange, and the canton in dark red
- Coordinates: 49.6111°N 6.05°E
- Country: Luxembourg
- Canton: Luxembourg

Government
  - Mayor: Youri De Smet (DP)

Area
  - Total: 17.39 km^{2} (6.71 sq mi)
  - Rank: 67th of 100
- Highest elevation: 352 m (1,155 ft)
  - Rank: 84th of 100
- Lowest elevation: 277 m (909 ft)
  - Rank: 79th of 100

Population (2025)
  - Total: 9,097
  - Rank: 16th of 100
  - Density: 523.1/km^{2} (1,355/sq mi)
  - Rank: 17th of 100
- Time zone: UTC+1 (CET)
  - Summer (DST): UTC+2 (CEST)
- LAU 2: LU0000301
- Website: bertrange.lu

Bertrange (French pronunciation: [bɛʁtʁɑ̃ʒ]; Luxembourgish: Bartreng [ˈbɑχtʀeŋ]; German: Bartringen [baʁtʁɪŋən]) is a commune and town in south-western Luxembourg. It is located 6.5 km west of Luxembourg City.

As of 2023, the commune has a population of 8,668, of which just over half are Luxembourgers. People of over 102 different nationalities live in the commune.

To the north of the town of Bertrange, on the other side of the route d'Arlon, is the village of Tossenberg, next to which is Luxembourg's largest shopping centre, La Belle Etoile.

== History ==
The Treveri, a Gallic tribe, inhabited the region for several hundred years until they were conquered by Julius Caesar in 54 BC. During the Gallo-Roman era which lasted until about 450, the Romans built a number of roads in the area including the Kiem (Latin caminus, road) linking Trier to Reims. It passed through Strassen (Strata) to what is now Bertrange at Tossenberg where there was a refreshment post for travellers and continued to nearby Mamer (Mambra), a Roman vicus, and Arlon (Orolauneum). Another road connected Tossenberg to Titelberg near Rodange. Evidence of Gallo-Roman and indeed Treveri inhabitants in Bertrange was found during excavations starting 1997.

There was probably a feudal castle in Bertrange as its lords are mentioned in documents establishing the freedom of Echternach in 1226 and of Luxembourg in 1243.

== Population ==
Historical population

Year	Pop.	±%
1821	822	—
1851	1,180	+43.6%
1900	1,177	−0.3%
1910	1,140	−3.1%
1922	1,227	+7.6%
1935	1,362	+11.0%

Year	Pop.	±%
1947	1,320	−3.1%
1960	1,677	+27.0%
1970	2,461	+46.8%
1981	4,000	+62.5%
1990	4,178	+4.4%
2000	5,229	+25.2%

Year	Pop.	±%
2005	5,813	+11.2%
2010	6,389	+9.9%
2015	6,869	+7.5%
2020	8,432	+22.8%
2021	8,472	+0.5%

Source data

== Politics ==
Like nearby Luxembourg City, Bertrange is one of the strongest communes for the Democratic Party (DP), with 51.1% of the votes cast in the 2023 communal elections being for the DP. In the communal council, the DP rules outright, with seven of the eleven councillors. The mayor is Monique Smit-Thijs of the DP, who heads an administration also consisting of two échevins.

== Twin towns ==
Bertrange is twinned with:

- Santa Maria Nuova, Italy

== See also ==
- Helfenterbruck, a forest and upscale semi-rural neighborhood in Bertrange
- Schauwenburg Castle
