= Kai Wargalla =

German politician (born 1984)

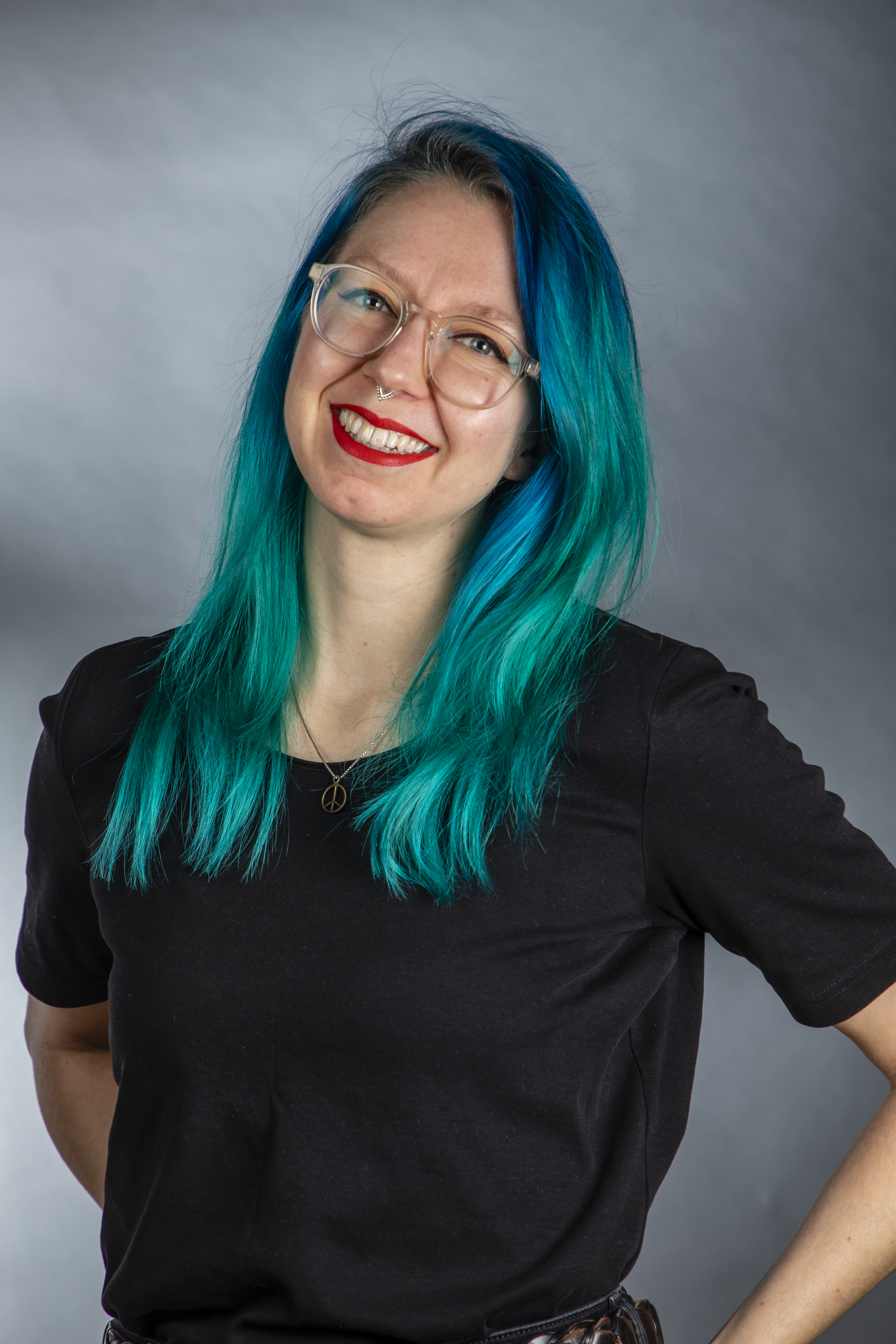
- Wargalla in 2019

Member of the Bürgerschaft of Bremen
- Incumbent
- Assumed office 30 September 2016
- Preceded by: Wilko Zicht

Personal details
- Born: 6 December 1984 (age 41) Achim
- Party: Alliance 90/The Greens
- Parent: Elisabeth Wargalla (mother)

Kai-Lena Wargalla (born 6 December 1984 in Achim) is a German politician serving as a member of the Bürgerschaft of Bremen since 2016. From 2016 to 2017, she served as co-spokesperson of Alliance 90/The Greens in Bremen. She is the daughter of Elisabeth Wargalla.
