= Delticom =

German online seller

Delticom AG

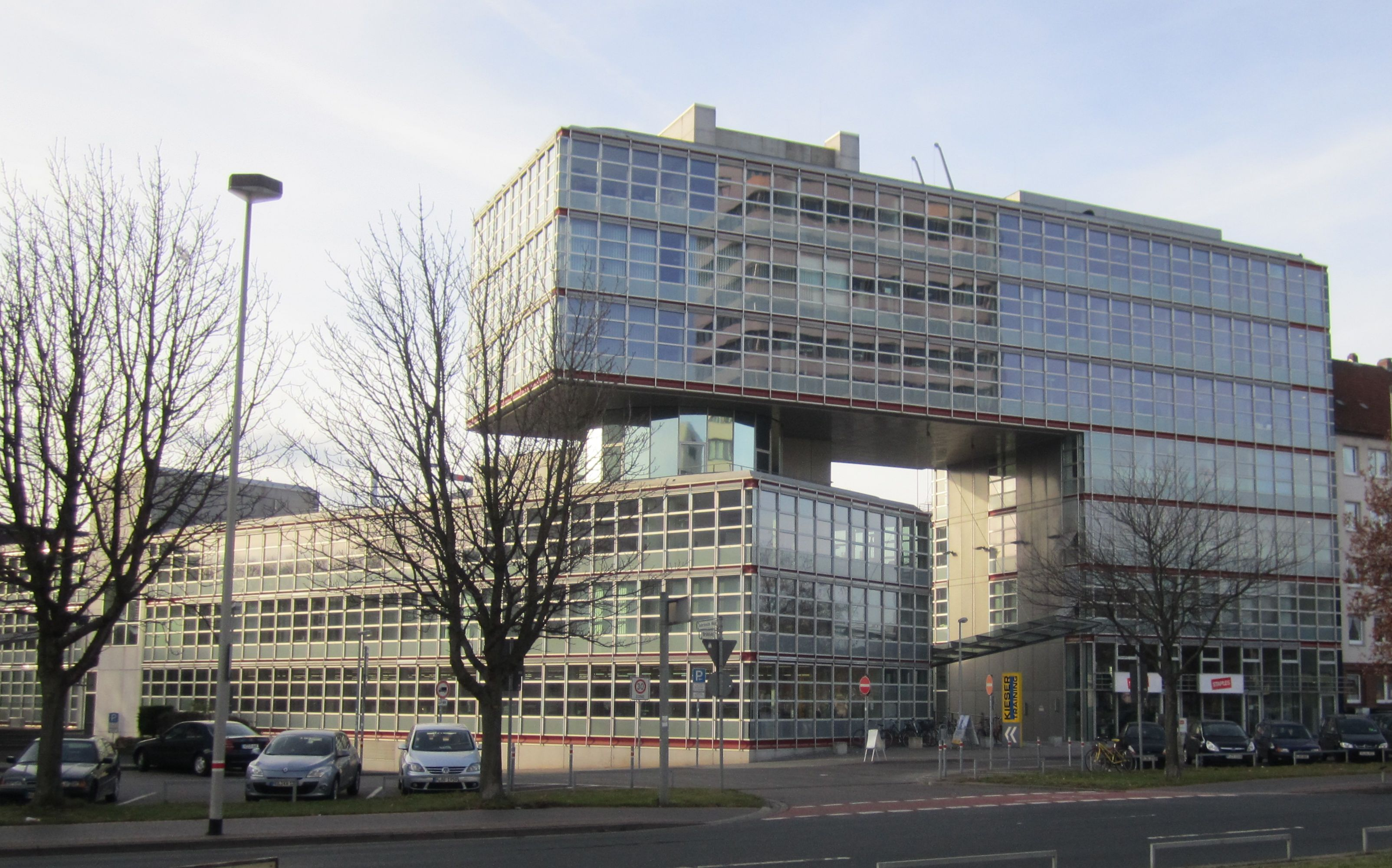
- Headquarters in Hanover
- Type: Aktiengesellschaft
- Traded as: FWB: DEX; SDAX component
- Industry: Internet, online retailing
- Founded: Hanover, Germany (1999)
- Founder: Rainer Binder; Andreas Prüfer
- Headquarters: Hannover, Germany
- Area served: Worldwide
- Products: tires, car parts
- Revenue: 475,690,000 (2023)
- Operating income: 11,520,000 (2023)
- Net income: 8,030,000 (2023)
- Total assets: 191,560,000 (2023)
- Number of employees: 169 (2023)
- Website: www.delti.com

Delticom AG is a listed company based in Hanover. It operates 140 online shops in 42 countries selling car and motor cycle tyres and a range of accessories to both private and corporate customers. Delticom is Europe's largest online tyre retailer with sales of over €500 million per year.

== History ==
Delticom was founded in Hanover in 1999 by Rainer Binder and Andreas Prüfer, two former managers at Continental AG.

In 2000, Delticom AG launched ReifenDirekt.de, its first online shop for end consumers. This was followed in June of the same year by Autoreifenonline.de, the first such outlet for trade customers. In August 2001, Delticom set up its first subsidiary in the form of Delticom Ltd. in the United Kingdom and launched mytyres.co.uk, its first online tyre shop in a non-German speaking country.

In April 2002, the firm was nominated for the German Business Start-Up Award (German: Deutscher Gründerpreis) and achieved a top-three placement in the category for fast-growing companies. From 2003, the firm expanded its existing tyre range by adding engine oils, motor cycle batteries, rear and roof carrier systems and car parts. In November 2003, Delticom won a cash award in the German Internet Prize for its Internet tyre retail concept. In December of the same year, it won the 2003 World Summit Award.

In September 2004, Delticom AG acquired new investors in the form of Nord Holding and RBK (both based in Hanover) permitting further international expansion. A further prize came Delticom's way in October 2004, when it secured third place in the "Deloitte Technology Fast50" Competition. The company won recognition for being one of the fastest growing German technological companies not quoted on the stock exchange.

Delticom has been quoted in the Prime Standard market segment of the Frankfurt Stock Exchange. From 19 December 2008 until 22 June 2015 Delticom Shares have been a part of SDAX. The share is also traded on the Nisax20 Index in Lower Saxony. In September 2013, Delticom acquired its competitor Tirendo for approximately €50 million.

== Subsidiaries ==
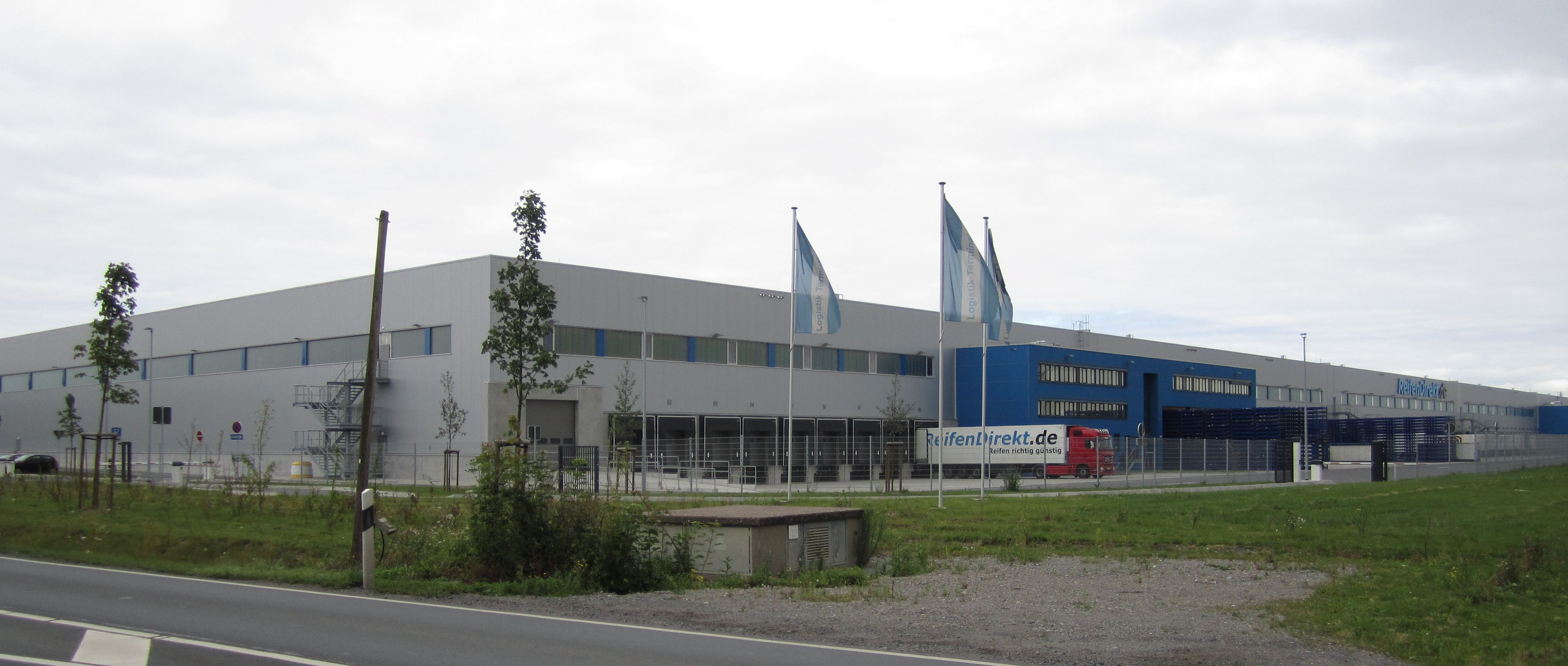
Reifendirekt warehouse in Höver near Hanover

Delticom AG owns the following subsidiaries:

- Delticom North America Inc., Benicia (California, USA)
- Delticom OE S.R.L., Timișoara (Romania)
- Delticom Tyres Ltd., Oxford (United Kingdom)
- Deltiparts GmbH, Hannover (Germany)
- Giga GmbH, Hamburg (Germany)
- Pnebo Gesellschaft für Reifengroßhandel und Logistik mbH, Hannover (Germany)
- Reife tausend1 GmbH, Hannover (Germany)
- Tirendo Deutschland GmbH, Berlin (Germany)
- Tirendo Holding GmbH, Berlin (Germany)
- TyresNET GmbH, Munich (Germany)
- Tyrepac Pte. Ltd., Singapore
- Wholesale Tire and Automotive Inc., Benicia (California, USA)

== Corporate sponsorship ==
In connection with a competition organized by the German Federal Ministry of Economics and Technology in 2006, Delticom sponsored a special prize for E-commerce worth 5000 euros.
