= Biodynamic agriculture =

Esoteric farming from Rudolf Steiner's ideas

Biodynamic agriculture is a form of alternative agriculture based on pseudoscientific and esoteric concepts initially developed in 1924 by Rudolf Steiner (1861–1925). It was the first of the organic farming movements. It treats soil fertility, plant growth, and livestock care as ecologically interrelated tasks, emphasising spiritual and mystical perspectives.

Biodynamics has much in common with other organic approaches – it emphasizes the use of manures and composts and excludes the use of synthetic (artificial) fertilizers, pesticides and herbicides on soil and plants. Methods unique to the biodynamic approach include its treatment of animals, crops, and soil as a single system, an emphasis from its beginnings on local production and distribution systems, its use of traditional (and development of new) local breeds and varieties. Some methods use an astrological sowing and planting calendar. Biodynamic agriculture uses various herbal and mineral additives for compost additives and field sprays; these are prepared using methods that are more akin to sympathetic magic than agronomy, such as burying ground quartz stuffed into the horn of a cow, which are said to harvest "cosmic forces in the soil".

No difference in beneficial outcomes has been scientifically established between certified biodynamic agricultural techniques and similar organic and integrated farming practices. Biodynamic agriculture is a pseudoscience as it lacks scientific evidence for its efficacy because of its reliance upon esoteric and mystical beliefs.

As of 2022, biodynamic techniques were used on 255,051 hectares in 65 countries, led by Germany, Italy and France. Germany accounts for 42% of the global total. The remainder average 1,750 ha per country. Biodynamic methods of cultivating grapevines have been taken up by several notable vineyards. There are certification agencies for biodynamic products, most of which are members of the international biodynamics standards group Demeter International.

== History ==
=== Origin of a theory ===
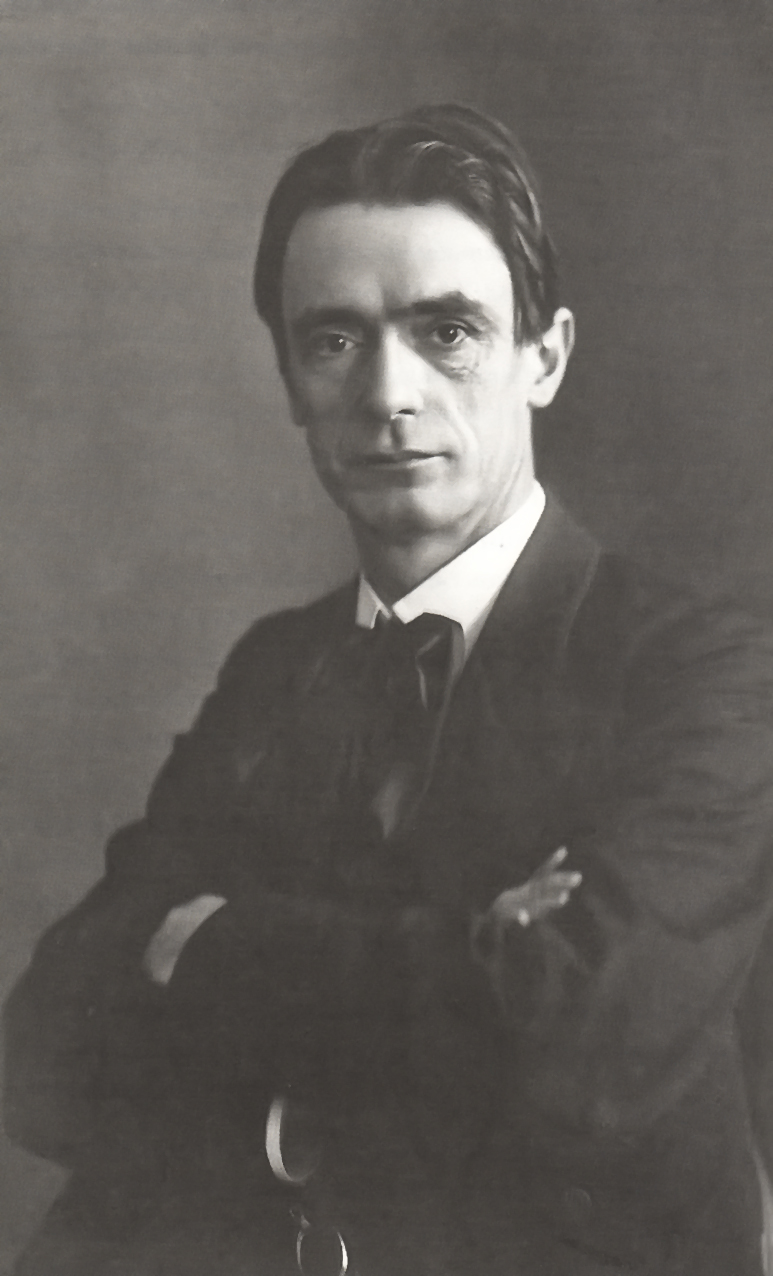
Rudolf Steiner, occultist philosopher and founder of "anthroposophic agriculture", later known as "biodynamic".

Biodynamics was the first modern organic agriculture. Its development began in 1924 with a series of eight lectures on agriculture given by philosopher Rudolf Steiner at Schloss Koberwitz in Silesia, Germany (now Kobierzyce in Poland). These lectures, the first known presentation of organic agriculture, were held in response to a request by farmers who noticed degraded soil conditions and a deterioration in the health and quality of crops and livestock resulting from the use of chemical fertilizers. The 111 attendees, fewer than half of whom were farmers, came from six countries, primarily Germany and Poland. The lectures were published in November 1924; the first English translation appeared in 1928 as The Agriculture Course.

Steiner emphasized that the methods he proposed should be tested experimentally. For this purpose, Steiner established a research group, the "Agricultural Experimental Circle of Anthroposophical Farmers and Gardeners of the General Anthroposophical Society". Between 1924 and 1939, this research group attracted about 800 members from around the world, including Europe, the Americas and Australasia. Another group, the "Association for Research in Anthroposophical Agriculture" (Versuchsring anthroposophischer Landwirte), directed by the German agronomist Erhard Bartsch, was formed to test the effects of biodynamic methods on the life and health of soil, plants and animals; the group published a monthly journal, Demeter. Bartsch was also instrumental in developing a sales organisation for biodynamic products, Demeter, which still exists today. The Research Association was renamed the Imperial Association for Biodynamic Agriculture (Reichsverband für biologisch-dynamische Wirtschaftsweise) in 1933. It was dissolved by the National Socialist regime in 1941. In 1931 the association had 250 members in Germany, 109 in Switzerland, 104 in other European countries and 24 outside Europe. The oldest biodynamic farms are the Wurzerhof in Austria and Marienhöhe in Germany.

In 1938, Ehrenfried Pfeiffer's text, Bio-Dynamic Farming and Gardening, was published in five languages – English, Dutch, Italian, French, and German; this became the standard work in the field for several decades. The following year Pfeiffer's book was published in Danish by Carl Vett. In July 1939, at the invitation of Walter James, 4th Baron Northbourne, Pfeiffer travelled to the UK and presented the Betteshanger Summer School and Conference on Biodynamic Farming at Northbourne's farm in Kent. The conference has been described as the 'missing link' between biodynamic agriculture and organic farming because, in the year after Betteshanger, Northbourne published his manifesto of organic farming, Look to the Land, in which he coined the term 'organic farming' and praised the methods of Rudolf Steiner. In the 1950s, Hans Mueller was encouraged by Steiner's work to create the organic-biological farming method in Switzerland; this later developed to become the largest certifier of organic products in Europe, Bioland.

=== Geographic developments ===
Today biodynamics is practised in more than 50 countries worldwide and in a variety of circumstances, ranging from temperate arable farming, viticulture in France, cotton production in Egypt, to silkworm breeding in China. Demeter International is the primary certification agency for farms and gardens using the methods. In 2020 Demeter International and the International Biodynamic Association joined to become the Biodynamic Federation – Demeter International.

- In the United States, biodynamic farming dates from 1926. From 1926 through to 1938, 39 farmers and gardeners in the US pursued biodynamic practices. The Biodynamic Farming & Gardening Association was founded in 1938 as a New York state corporation.
- In Great Britain, biodynamic farming dates from 1927. In 1928 the Anthroposophical Agricultural Foundation was founded in England; this is now called the Biodynamic Agriculture Association. In 1939, Britain's first biodynamic agriculture conference, the Betteshanger Summer School and Conference on Biodynamic Agriculture, was held at Lord Northbourne's farm in Kent; Ehrenfried Pfeiffer was the lead presenter.
- In Australia, the first biodynamic farmer was Ernesto Genoni who in 1928 joined the Experimental Circle of Anthroposophical Farmers and Gardeners, followed soon after by his brother Emilio Genoni. Ernesto Genoni's first biodynamic farm was at Dalmore, in Gippsland, Victoria, in 1933. The following year, Ileen Macpherson and Ernesto Genoni founded Demeter Biological Farm at Dandenong, Victoria, in 1934 and it was farmed using biodynamic principles for over two decades. Bob Williams presented the first public lecture in Australia on biodynamic agriculture on 26 June 1938 at the home of the architects Walter Burley Griffin and Marion Mahony Griffin at Castlecrag, Sydney. Since the 1950s research work has continued at the Biodynamic Research Institute (BDRI) in Powelltown, near Melbourne under the direction of Alex Podolinsky. In 1989 Biodynamic Agriculture Australia was established, as a not for profit association.
- In France the International Federation of Organic Agriculture Movements (IFOAM) was formed in 1972 with five founding members, one of which was the Swedish Biodynamic Association.
- The University of Kassel had a Department of Biodynamic Agriculture from 2006 to March 2011.
- Emerson College (UK) was founded in 1962 and named after Ralph Waldo Emerson, American poet and transcendentalist. Since then it has held courses inspired by the philosophy and teachings of Rudolf Steiner, including on biodynamic agriculture.
- In Canada, there are currently three biodynamic organisations, The Society for Biodynamic Farming and Gardening in Ontario, The Biodynamic Agricultural Society of British Columbia and the Association de Biodynamie du Québec that are members of Demeter Canada.

== Biodynamic method of farming ==
In common with other forms of organic agriculture, biodynamic agriculture uses management practices that are intended to "restore, maintain and enhance ecological harmony". Central features include crop diversification, the avoidance of chemical soil treatments and off-farm inputs generally, decentralized production and distribution, and the consideration of celestial and terrestrial influences on biological organisms. The Demeter Association recommends that "(a) minimum of ten percent of the total farm acreage be set aside as a biodiversity preserve. That may include but is not limited to forests, wetlands, riparian corridors, and intentionally planted insectaries. Diversity in crop rotation and perennial planting is required: no annual crop can be planted in the same field for more than two years in succession. Bare tillage year round is prohibited so land needs to maintain adequate green cover."

The Demeter Association also recommends that the individual design of the land "by the farmer, as determined by site conditions, is one of the basic tenets of biodynamic agriculture. This principle emphasises that humans have a responsibility for the development of their ecological and social environment which goes beyond economic aims and the principles of descriptive ecology." Crops, livestock, and farmer, and "the entire socioeconomic environment" form a unique interaction, which biodynamic farming tries to "actively shape ...through a variety of management practices. The prime objective is always to encourage healthy conditions for life": soil fertility, plant and animal health, and product quality. "The farmer seeks to enhance and support the forces of nature that lead to healthy crops, and rejects farm management practices that damage the environment, soil, plant, animal or human health....the farm is conceived of as an organism, a self-contained entity with its own individuality," holistically conceived and self-sustaining. "Disease and insect control are addressed through botanical species diversity, predator habitat, balanced crop nutrition, and attention to light penetration and airflow. Weed control emphasizes prevention, including timing of planting, mulching, and identifying and avoiding the spread of invasive weed species."

Biodynamic agriculture differs from many forms of organic agriculture in its spiritual, mystical, and astrological orientation. It shares a spiritual focus, as well as its view toward improving humanity, with the "nature farming" movement in Japan. Important features include the use of livestock manures to sustain plant growth (recycling of nutrients), maintenance and improvement of soil quality, and the health and well-being of crops and animals. Cover crops, green manures and crop rotations are used extensively and the farms to foster the diversity of plant and animal life, and to enhance the biological cycles and the biological activity of the soil.

Biodynamic farms often have a cultural component and encourage local community, both through developing local sales and through on-farm community building activities. Some biodynamic farms use the Community Supported Agriculture model, which has connections with social threefolding.

Compared to non-organic agriculture, BD farming practices have been found to be more resilient to environmental challenges, to foster a diverse biosphere, and to be more energy efficient, factors Eric Lichtfouse describes being of increasing importance in the face of climate change, energy scarcity and population growth.

=== Biodynamic preparations ===
In his "agricultural course" Steiner prescribed nine different preparations to aid fertilisation, and described how these were to be prepared. Steiner believed that these preparations mediated terrestrial and cosmic forces into the soil. The prepared substances are numbered 500 through 508, where the first two are used for preparing fields, and the other seven are used for making compost. A long term trial (DOK experiment) evaluating the biodynamic farming system in comparison with organic and conventional farming systems, found that both organic farming and biodynamic farming resulted in enhanced soil properties, but had lower yields than conventional farming. Regarding compost development beyond accelerating the initial phase of composting, some positive effects have been noted:

- The field sprays contain substances that stimulate plant growth including cytokinins.
- Some improvement in nutrient content of compost is evident from the ingredients included, but not necessarily as a result of the practices and exact preparations as Steiner described them.

Although the preparations have direct nutrient values, modern biodynamic practitioners believe their benefit is to support the self-regulating capacities of the biota already present in the soil and compost. Critics of the practice have pointed out that no evidence or logic underlies the practices themselves, which instead are dependent on magical thinking and debunked theories of Steiner himself. There is no evidence that biodynamic practices have any benefit beyond the direct nutrients they add as fertilizer, which may itself be of smaller benefit than other traditionally organic or commercial fertilizers.

==== Field preparations ====
Field preparations, for stimulating humus formation:

- 500: A humus mixture prepared by filling a cow's horn with cow manure and burying it in the ground (40–60 cm below the surface) in the autumn. It is left to decompose during the winter and recovered for use as fertilizer the following spring.
- 501: Crushed powdered quartz stuffed into a cow's horn and buried in the ground in springtime and taken out in autumn. It can be mixed with 500 but is usually prepared on its own. The mixture is sprayed under very low pressure over the crop during the wet season, as a supposed antifungal.

==== Compost preparations ====
The compost preparations Steiner recommended employ herbs which are frequently used in alternative medical remedies. Many of the same herbs Steiner referenced are used in organic practices to make foliar fertilizers, green manure, or in composting. The preparations Steiner discussed were:

- 502: Yarrow blossoms (Achillea millefolium) stuffed into the urinary bladders from red deer (Cervus elaphus), placed in the sun during summer, buried in the ground during winter, and retrieved in the spring.
- 503: Chamomile blossoms (Matricaria recutita) stuffed into the small intestines of cattle, buried in humus-rich earth in the autumn, and retrieved in the spring.
- 504: Stinging nettle (Urtica dioica) plants in full bloom stuffed together underground surrounded on all sides by peat for a year.
- 505: Oak bark (Quercus robur) chopped in small pieces, placed inside the skull of a domesticated animal, surrounded by peat, and buried in the ground in a place near rain runoff.
- 506: Dandelion flowers (Taraxacum officinale) stuffed into the mesentery of a cow, buried in the ground during winter, and retrieved in the spring.
- 507: Valerian flowers (Valeriana officinalis) extracted into water.
- 508: Horsetail (Equisetum).

=== Planting calendar ===
The approach considers that there are lunar and astrological influences on soil and plant development—for example, choosing to plant, cultivate, or harvest various crops based on both the phase of the moon and the zodiacal constellation the moon is passing through, and also depending on whether the crop is the root, leaf, flower, or fruit of the plant. This aspect of biodynamics has been termed "astrological" and "pseudoscientific" in nature.

=== Seed production ===
Biodynamic agriculture has focused on the open pollination of seeds (with farmers thereby generally growing their own seed) and the development of locally adapted varieties.

== Biodynamic certification ==
The Demeter biodynamic certification system established in 1924 was the first certification and labelling system for organic production. As of 2018, to receive certification as biodynamic, the farm must meet the following standards: agronomic guidelines, greenhouse management, structural components, livestock guidelines, and post-harvest handling and processing procedures.

The term Biodynamic is a trademark held by the Demeter association of biodynamic farmers for the purpose of maintaining production standards used both in farming and processing foodstuffs. The trademark is intended to protect both the consumer and the producers of biodynamic produce. Demeter International an organization of member countries; each country has its own Demeter organization which is required to meet international production standards (but can also exceed them). The original Demeter organization was founded in 1928; the U.S. Demeter Association was formed in the 1980s and certified its first farm in 1982. In France, Biodyvin certifies biodynamic wine. In Egypt, SEKEM has created the Egyptian Biodynamic Association (EBDA), an association that provides training for farmers to become certified. As of 2006, more than 200 wineries worldwide were certified as biodynamic; numerous other wineries employ biodynamic methods to a greater or lesser extent.

== Effectiveness ==
Research into biodynamic farming has been complicated by the difficulty of isolating the distinctively biodynamic aspects when conducting comparative trials. Consequently, there is no strong body of material that provides evidence of any specific effect.

Since biodynamic farming is a form of organic farming, it can be generally assumed to share its characteristics, including "less stressed soils and thus diverse and highly interrelated soil communities".

A 2009/2011 review found that biodynamically cultivated fields:

- had lower absolute yields than conventional farms, but achieved better efficiency of production relative to the amount of energy used;
- had greater earthworm populations and biomass than conventional farms.

Both factors were similar to the result in organically cultivated fields.

Recent long-term research provides more insight into the effects of biodynamic preparations on soil and crops.The Center for Sustaining Agriculture and Natural Resources of the Washington State University in Pullman indicates that biodynamic preparations may prevent plant diseases through the preventive stimulation of the immune system in crops. A research team from the University of Kassel examined soil samples from four French vineyards for the positive effect of biodynamic preparations on microbial activity.

== Reception ==
In a 2002 newspaper editorial, Peter Treue, agricultural researcher at Kiel University, characterized biodynamics as pseudoscience and argued that similar or equal results can be obtained using standard organic farming principles. He wrote that some biodynamic preparations more resemble alchemy or magic akin to geomancy.

In a 1994 analysis, Holger Kirchmann, a soil researcher with the Swedish University of Agricultural Sciences, concluded that Steiner's instructions were occult and dogmatic, and cannot contribute to the development of alternative or sustainable agriculture. According to Kirchmann, many of Steiner's statements are not provable because scientifically clear hypotheses cannot be made from his descriptions. Kirchmann asserted that when methods of biodynamic agriculture were tested scientifically, the results were unconvincing. Further, in a 2004 overview of biodynamic agriculture, Linda Chalker-Scott, a researcher at Washington State University, characterized biodynamics as pseudoscience, writing that Steiner did not use scientific methods to formulate his theory of biodynamics, and that the later addition of valid organic farming techniques has "muddled the discussion" of Steiner's original idea. Based on the scant scientific testing of biodynamics, Chalker-Scott concluded "no evidence exists" that homeopathic preparations improve the soil.

In Michael Shermer's The Skeptic Encyclopedia of Pseudoscience, Dan Dugan says that the way biodynamic preparations are supposed to be implemented are formulated solely on the basis of Steiner's "own insight". Skeptic Brian Dunning writes "the best way to think of 'biodynamic agriculture' would be as a magic spell cast over an entire farm. Biodynamics sees an entire farm as a single organism, with something that they call a life force."

Florian Leiber, Nikolai Fuchs and Hartmut Spieß, researchers at the Goetheanum, have defended the principles of biodynamics and suggested that critiques of biodynamic agriculture which deny it scientific credibility are "not in keeping with the facts...as they take no notice of large areas of biodynamic management and research". Biodynamic farmers are "charged with developing a continuous dialogue between biodynamic science and the natural sciences sensu stricto", despite important differences in paradigms, world views, and value systems.

Philosopher of science Michael Ruse has written that followers of biodynamic agriculture rather enjoy the scientific marginalisation that comes from its pseudoscientific basis, revelling both in its esoteric aspects and the impression that they were in the vanguard of the wider anti-science sentiment that has grown in opposition to modern methods such as genetic modification.

Steiner's theory was similar to those of the agricultural scientist Richard Krzymowski, who was teaching in Breslau since 1922. The environmental scientist Frank M. Rauch mentioned in 1995, concerning the reprint of a book from Raoul Heinrich Francé, another source probably used by Steiner.

According to a scientific paper of Holger Kirchmann in 2021, the auras and forces mentioned by Steiner are not known to science. His statement (hypothesis) of "living forces" affecting crops cannot be tested, and is thus not falsifiable. However, when a hypothesis is not falsifiable, this is a sign of pseudoscience.

As noted by Hammer, this means that anthroposophy harbors extensive empirical claims on "the most diverse subjects: matters normally defined as belonging to the domain of science, yet made immune to scientific critique because of Steiner's radical dichotomy—agronomy, chemistry, pharmacology, physiology, anatomy, developmental psychology, astronomy, physics etc." (Hammer 2004, 227).

— Hansson 2022

A research team from the Botanical Garden and Department of Experimental and Social Sciences Education of the Faculty of Teacher Training of the University of Valencia warned in 2021 about the risk of pseudoscience in relation with myths or beliefs about the influence of the moon on agriculture. The findings of this scientific review of over 100 papers (including scientific articles, papers and higher education textbooks) have been published in the journal Agronomy. They found that there is no reliable, science-based evidence for any relationship between lunar phases and plant physiology in any plant–science related textbooks or peer-reviewed journal articles justifying agricultural practices conditioned by the Moon. Nor does evidence from the field of physics support a causal relationship between lunar forces and plant responses. Therefore, popular agricultural practices that are tied to lunar phases have no scientific backing.

== See also ==
- Agroecology
- Alan Chadwick
- Biointensive agriculture
- The Real Dirt on Farmer John – documentary on a conventional farm which converted to biodynamic and community-supported agriculture
- Wild farming
