= Demeter International =

Certification organization for biodynamic agriculture

Biodynamic Federation Demeter International
- Founded: 1928; 98 years ago
- Founder: Erhard Bartsch, Franz Dreidax
- Type: Non-profit umbrella organisation
- Purpose: Organic movement
- Origins: based on Rudolf Steiner's theories
- Method: Certification
- Members: 1400 (Germany); 4500 (worldwide)
- Website: demeter.net

The Biodynamic Federation Demeter International is the largest certification organization for biodynamic agriculture. Its name is a reference to Demeter, the Greek goddess of grain and fertility. It is a non-profit umbrella organisation with 46 members organisations in 36 countries, and over participating 6,500 farmers around the world, representing both the global biodynamic movement and the Demeter certified biodynamic farms. The organization incorporates 19 certifying Demeter organizations, and the rest of the certification is done by the international certification committee.

The Demeter Biodynamic Certification is used in over 65 countries to verify that biodynamic products meet international standards in production and processing.

The Demeter symbol was introduced and registered as a trademark in 1928, and as such was the first ecological label for organically produced foods.

== Description ==
Certification is difficult to obtain and must be renewed annually. Demeter’s “biodynamic” certification requires biodiversity and ecosystem preservation, soil husbandry, livestock integration, prohibition of genetically engineered organisms and viewing the farm as a living “holistic organism”. The certification verifies the fulfillment of the standards on behalf of the farmers, which in turn guarantees high quality food products to the consumers. This is rewarded by receiving a higher price for food certified with the “Demeter” label, ranging from 10-30% on average.

== History ==
In 1924, Austrian philosopher Rudolf Steiner delivered a series of agricultural lectures, laying the groundwork for biodynamics, a farming method intertwined with his anthroposophist movement. Despite his humanist and universalist ideals, Steiner's writings attracted controversy. The Biodynamic Federation created in Berlin as a German agricultural cooperative, was originally named Demeter International and emerged in 1927 for the processing of products for biodynamic agriculture. In 1928 the trademark Demeter was registered.

Demeter was administered by the German agronomist Erhard Bartsch who also directed the Experimental Circle of anthroposophical (biodynamic) farmers, and had chosen the name Demeter, jointly with the German chemist Franz Dreidax. Dreidax was responsible for the development of the Demeter brand and quality control.

During the 1930s, Steiner's biodynamic farming found favor with the emerging Nazi party, which endorsed its anti-materialistic principles. Collaborating with the Nazi regime, Demeter aligned with Nazi ideals, though some officials like Reinhard Heydrich (the founding head of the Nazi Security Service (SS)) viewed Steiner's anthroposophist philosophy with suspicion. With the assistance of the SS, the Nazis established biodynamic agricultural plantations at concentration camps like Dachau and Ravensbrück, exploiting prisoners for labor.

The Demeter name was adopted internationally. In Australia, two members of the Experimental Circle, Ernesto Genoni and Ileen Macpherson founded Demeter Biological Farm in Melbourne in 1934 and operated it as a biodynamic farm for two decades (until 1954).

In 1935, Heydrich dissolved the Anthroposophical Society in Germany and went on to officially ban Demeter across the Third Reich by 1941. The ban on Demeter was precipitated by deputy führer Rudolf Hess's fall from favor and subsequent arrest for his support of biodynamics. Leveraging the arrest, Heydrich's ban removed the previous political protection Demeter and other similar bodies had received, and resulted in biodynamics being officially opposed by the regime. Despite this, the Nazis continued to operate the plantations at Dachau and Ravensbrück.

== Demeter Deutschland ==
Demeter Deutschland e.V. (Demeter Germany) is the biggest and most important national Demeter organization. Demeter is well established in the origin country, where Rudolf Steiner spread his esoteric ideas about agriculture at the beginning of the 20th century.

Demeter Deutschland is a certifier for biodynamic production of food within Germany. The heads of the association are Alexander Gerber and Johannes Kamps-Bender. Its main competitors in Germany are the Bioland and Naturland certification associations. Demeter has a strong connection to the Alnatura bio-discounter chain, which is also anthroposophic.

== Biofach ==
Each year the Demeter Association hosts an international fair known as Biofach. The event is considered the world's leading trade fair for organic food, and provides the location at which the Biofach Congress also meet together.

== See also ==
- Organic certification
