= Richard Krzymowski =

German agricultural scientist (1875–1960)

Richard Krzymowski (5 September 1875 - 26 August 1960) was a German agricultural scientist. His main research interests were agricultural geography and agricultural history. Krzymowski's main work is "History of German Agriculture" an exemplary textbook for an integrated presentation of agricultural history, agricultural geography, and the history of agricultural production techniques.

== Literature ==
- Gertrud Schröder-Lembke: Richard Krzymowski zum 80.Geburtstag. In: Zeitschrift für Agrargeschichte und Agrarsoziologie Vol 3, 1955, P. 97–99.
- E. Gerhardt: Zum Gedenken an Richard Krzymowski (1875-1960). In: Gießener Hochschulblätter Vol 8, 1960, Nr. 2/3, P. 7–8.
- Heinz Haushofer: Richard Krzymowski †. In: Zeitschrift für Agrargeschichte und Agrarsoziologie Vol 9, 1961, P. 98–99.
- Gertrud Schröder-Lembke: Krzymowski, Richard. In: Neue Deutsche Biographie (NDB). Vol 13, Duncker & Humblot, Berlin 1982, ISBN 3-428-00194-X
