= Naturescaping =

Method of landscape design that involves incorporating native plants into one's yard

Naturescaping (or nature scaping) is a method of landscape design and landscaping that allows people and nature to coexist with landscaping. By incorporating certain native plants into one's yard, one can curtail the loss of wildlife habitat and attract beneficial insects, birds, and other creatures.

== Origins ==
Naturescaping takes some of its principles from the US Environmental Protection Agency's (EPA) "GreenScaping" or "Beneficial Landscaping" programs — which strive to reduce water, energy, and chemical usage. Naturescaping is an organic discipline of this practice, that is easily adapted to backyards.

== History ==
Most universities throughout the country, that have agricultural programs, also have university cooperative extensions. These programs include Master Gardeners. The practice of naturescaping is being taught at several of these universities.

== Current acceptance ==
The practice has spawned many non-profit groups to form near universities teaching this practice. Many include some form of the phrase "naturescaping" in their name. Some states have recognized the benefits to society of this practice and those who either volunteer or create a naturescaped garden. For instance, Oregon offers a state tax incentive..

== See also ==
- Landscape ecology
- Sustainable landscaping
- Natural landscaping
- Wildlife garden
