= Landscaping =

Modifying the visible features of areas of land

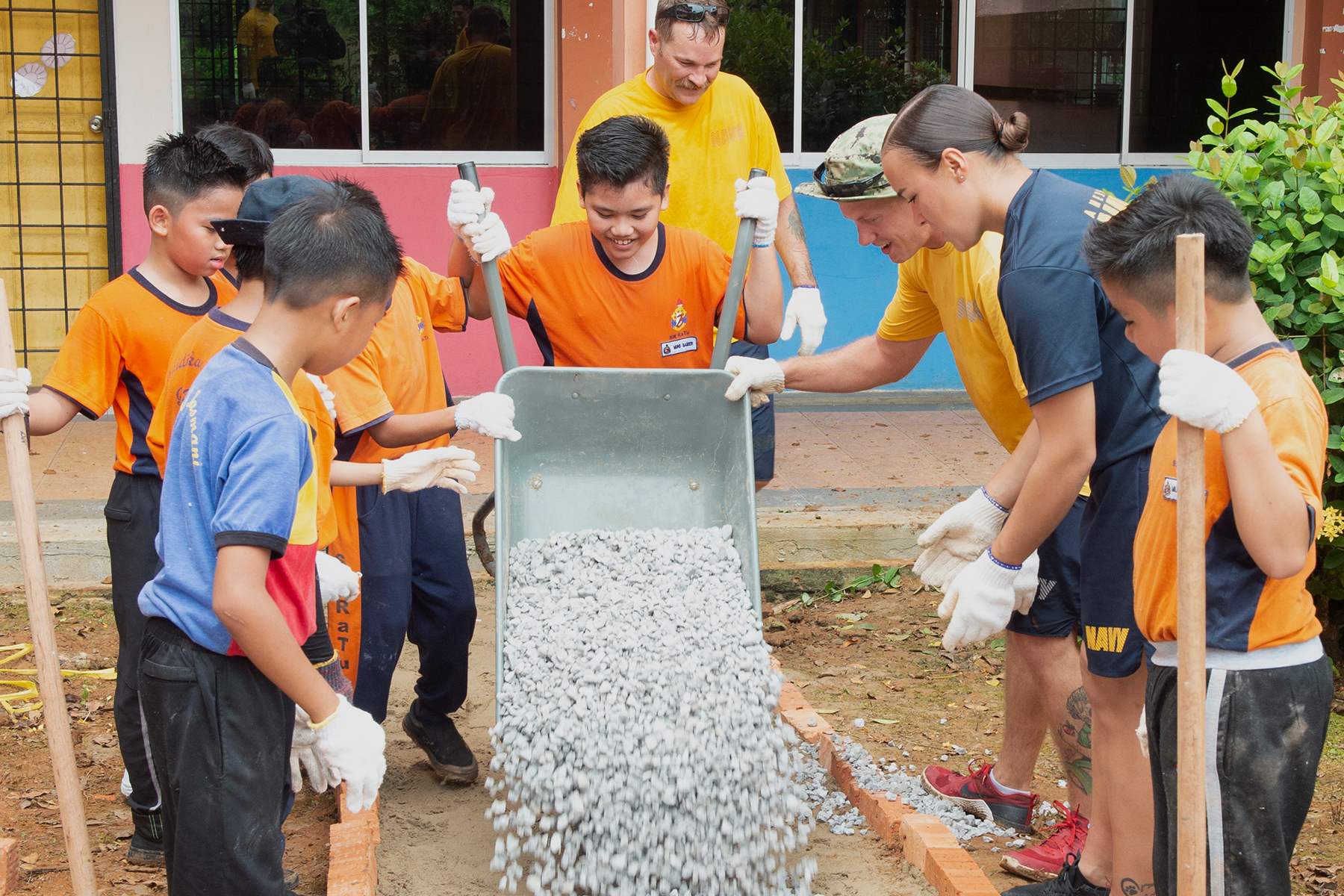
Landscaping an elementary school courtyard in the city of Kuching

Landscaping is any activity that modifies the visible features of an area of land, including the following:

1. Living elements, such as flora or fauna; or what is commonly called gardening, the art and craft of growing plants with a goal of creating a beauty within the landscape.
2. Natural abiotic elements, such as landforms, terrain shape and elevation, or bodies of water.
3. Abstract elements, such as the weather and lighting conditions.

Landscaping requires a certain understanding of horticulture and artistic design, but is not limited to plants and horticulture. Sculpting land to enhance usability (patio, walkways, ponds, water features) are also examples of landscaping being used. When intended as purely an aesthetic change, the term Ornamental Landscaping is used.

Often, designers refer to landscaping as an extension of rooms in the house (each one has a function). Outdoor spaces have a vast amount of flexibility as far as materials and function. It is often said the only limitation to outdoor space is one's imagination.

== Understanding the land ==
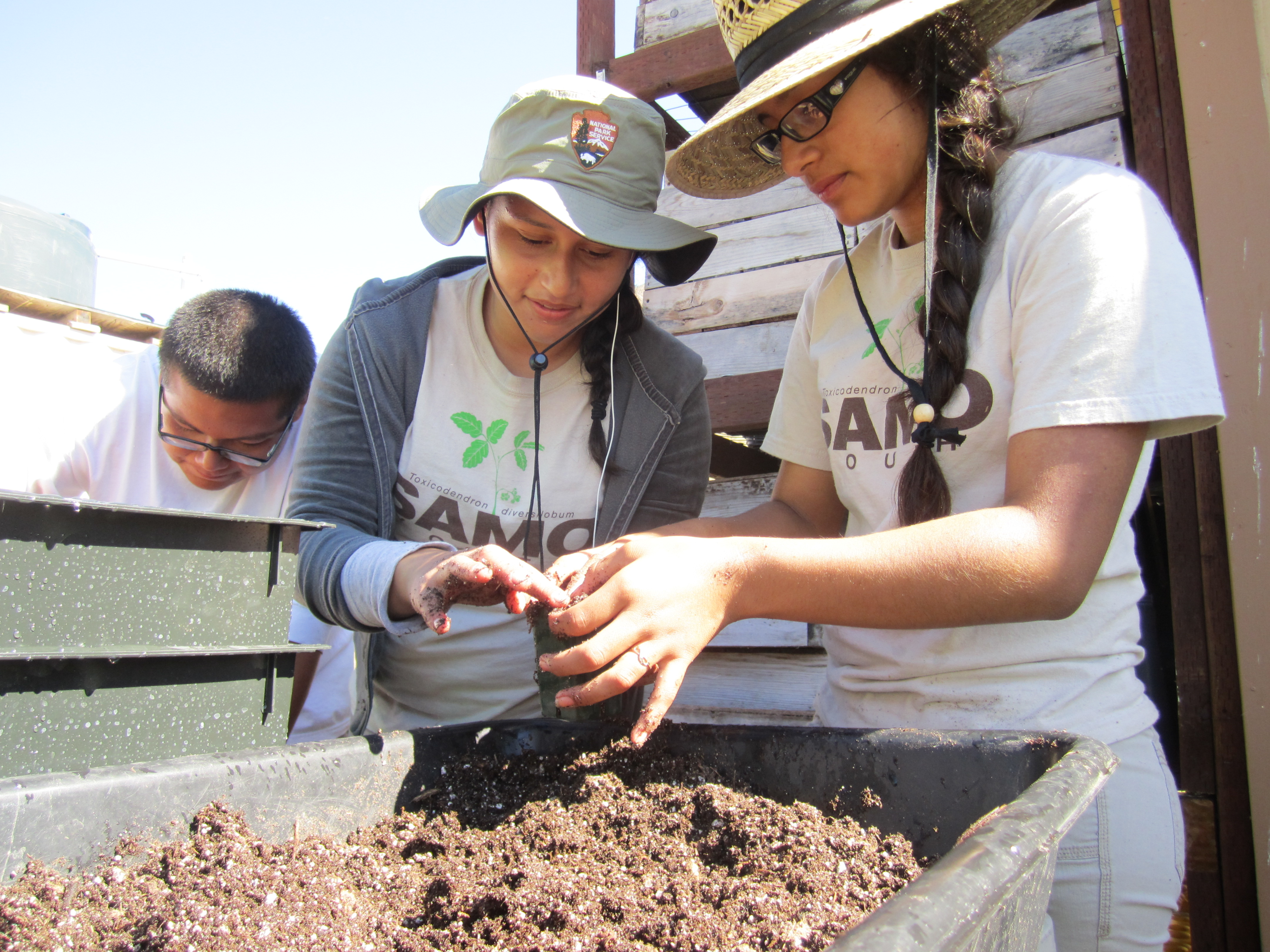
Youth working with and learning about native plants.

Construction requires both study and observation, and the process varies in different parts of the world. Landscaping varies according to different regions. Therefore, normally local natural experts are recommended if it is done for the first time. Understanding of the site is one of the chief essentials for successful landscaping. Different natural features and phenomena, like the position of the sun, terrain, topography, soil qualities, prevailing winds, depth of the frost line, and the system of native flora and fauna must be taken into account. Sometimes the land is not fit for landscaping. In order to landscape it, the land must be reshaped to direct water for appropriate drainage. This reshaping of land is called grading. Sometimes in large landscaping projects for example, parks, sports fields and reserves soil may need to be improved by adding nutrients for growth of plants or turf, this process is called soil amelioration.

Removal of earth from the land is called cutting while when earth is added to the slope, it is called filling. Sometimes the grading process may involve removal of excessive waste (landfills), soil and rocks, so designers should take into account while in the planning stage.

== Additional information ==
At the start, the landscaping contractor issues a statement which is a rough design and layout of what could be done with the land in order to achieve the desired outcome. Different pencils are required to make graphics of the picture. Landscaping has become more technological than natural, as few projects begin without bulldozers, lawnmowers, or chainsaws. Different areas have different qualities of plants. When growing new grass, it should ideally be done in the spring and the fall seasons to maximize growth and to minimize the spread of weeds. It is generally agreed that organic or chemical fertilizers are required for good plant growth. Some landscapers prefer to use mix gravel with rocks of varying sizes to add interest in large areas.

== See also ==
- Aquascaping
- Arboriculture
- Ecoscaping
- Horticulture
- Landscape architecture
- Landscape design
- Landscape ecology
- Landscape engineering
- Landscape planning
- Landscape archaeology
- Organic lawn management
- Naturescaping
- Sustainable landscaping
- Terraforming
- Xeriscaping
