= Sustainable landscaping =

Low maintenance landscaping

Sustainable landscaping is a modern type of gardening or landscaping that takes the environmental issue of sustainability into account. According to Loehrlein in 2009 this includes design, construction and management of residential and commercial gardens and incorporates organic lawn management and organic gardening techniques.

== Definition ==
A sustainable garden is designed to be both attractive and in balance with the local climate and environment and it should require minimal resource inputs. Thus, the design must be “functional, cost-efficient, visually pleasing, environmentally friendly and maintainable". As part of sustainable development, it pays close attention to preserving limited resources, reducing waste, and preventing air, water and soil pollution. Compost, fertilization, integrated pest management, using the right plant in the right place, appropriate use of turf and xeriscaping (water-wise gardening) are all components of sustainable landscaping.

== Benefits ==
Sustainability can help urban commercial landscaping companies save money. In California, gardens often do not outweigh the cost of inputs like water and labor. However, using appropriately selected and properly sited plants may help to ensure that maintenance costs are lower because of reduced inputs.

- Long-lasting
- Reduced water usage and no surface runoff or puddles
- Minimal use of fertilizers and pesticides
- Use of green waste
- Conservation of energy and resources

== Issues ==
Sustainability issues for landscaping include:

- Carbon sequestration
- Climate change
- Water conservation
- Energy usage

Non-sustainable practices include:

- Consumption of non-renewable resources
- Greenhouse gas emissions

== Solutions ==
Some of the solutions are:

- Reduction of stormwater run-off through the use of bio-swales, rain gardens and green roofs and walls.
- Reduction of water use in landscapes through design of water-wise garden techniques (sometimes known as xeriscaping)
- Bio-filtering of wastes through constructed wetlands
- Irrigation using water from showers and sinks, known as gray water
- Integrated Pest Management techniques for pest control
- Creating and enhancing wildlife habitat in urban environments
- Energy-efficient garden design in the form of proper placement and selection of shade trees and creation of wind breaks
- Permeable paving materials to reduce stormwater run-off and allow rain water to infiltrate into the ground and replenish groundwater rather than run into surface water
- Use of sustainably harvested wood, composite wood products for decking and other garden uses, as well as use of plastic lumber
- Recycling of products, such as glass, rubber from tires and other materials to create landscape products such as paving stones, mulch and other materials.
- Soil management techniques, including composting kitchen and yard wastes, to maintain and enhance healthy soil that supports a diversity of soil life
- Integration and adoption of renewable energy, including solar-powered lighting
- Development of lawn alternatives such as xeriscaping, floral lawns, and meadows.

=== Proper design ===
One step to garden design is to do a "sustainability audit". This is similar to a landscape site analysis that is typically performed by landscape designers at the beginning of the design process. Factors such as lot size, house size, local covenants and budgets should be considered. The steps to design include a base plan, site inventory and analysis, construction documents, implementation and maintenance. Of great importance is considerations related to the growing conditions of the site. These include orientation to the sun, soil type, wind flow, slopes, shade and climate, the goal of reducing irrigation and use of toxic substances, and requires proper plant selection for the specific site.

Sustainable landscaping is not only important because it saves money, it also limits the human impact on the surrounding ecosystem. However, planting species not native to the landscape may introduce invasive plant species as well as new wildlife that was not in the ecosystem before. Altering the ecosystem is a major problem and meeting with an expert with experience with the wildlife and agriculture in the area will help avoid this.

=== Irrigation ===
Mulch may be used to reduce water loss due to evaporation, reduce weeds, minimize erosion, dust and mud problems. Mulch can also add nutrients to the soil when it decomposes. However, mulch is most often used for weed suppression. Overuse of mulch can result in harm to the selected plantings. Care must be taken in the source of the mulch, for instance, black walnut trees result in a toxic mulch product. Grasscycling turf areas (using mulching mowers that leave grass clippings on the lawn) will also decrease the amount of fertilizer needed, reduce landfill waste and reduce costs of disposal.

A common recommendation is to add 2-4 inches of mulch in flower beds and under trees away from the trunk. Mulch should be applied under trees to the dripline (extension of the branches) in lieu of flowers, hostas, turf or other plants that are often planted there. This practice of planting under trees is detrimental to tree roots, especially when such plants are irrigated to an excessive level that harms the tree. One must be careful not to apply mulch to the bark of the tree. It can result in smothering, mould and insect depredation.

The practice of xeriscaping or water-wise gardening suggests that placing plants with similar water demands together will save time and low-water or drought-tolerant plants would be a smart initial consideration.

A homeowner may consider consulting an accredited irrigation technician/auditor and obtain a water audit of current systems. Drip or sub-surface irrigation may be useful. Using evapotranspiration controllers, soil sensors and refined control panels will reduce water loss. Irrigation heads may need readjustment to avoid sprinkling on sidewalks or streets. Business owners may consider developing watering schedules based on historical or actual weather data and soil probes to monitor soil moisture prior to watering.

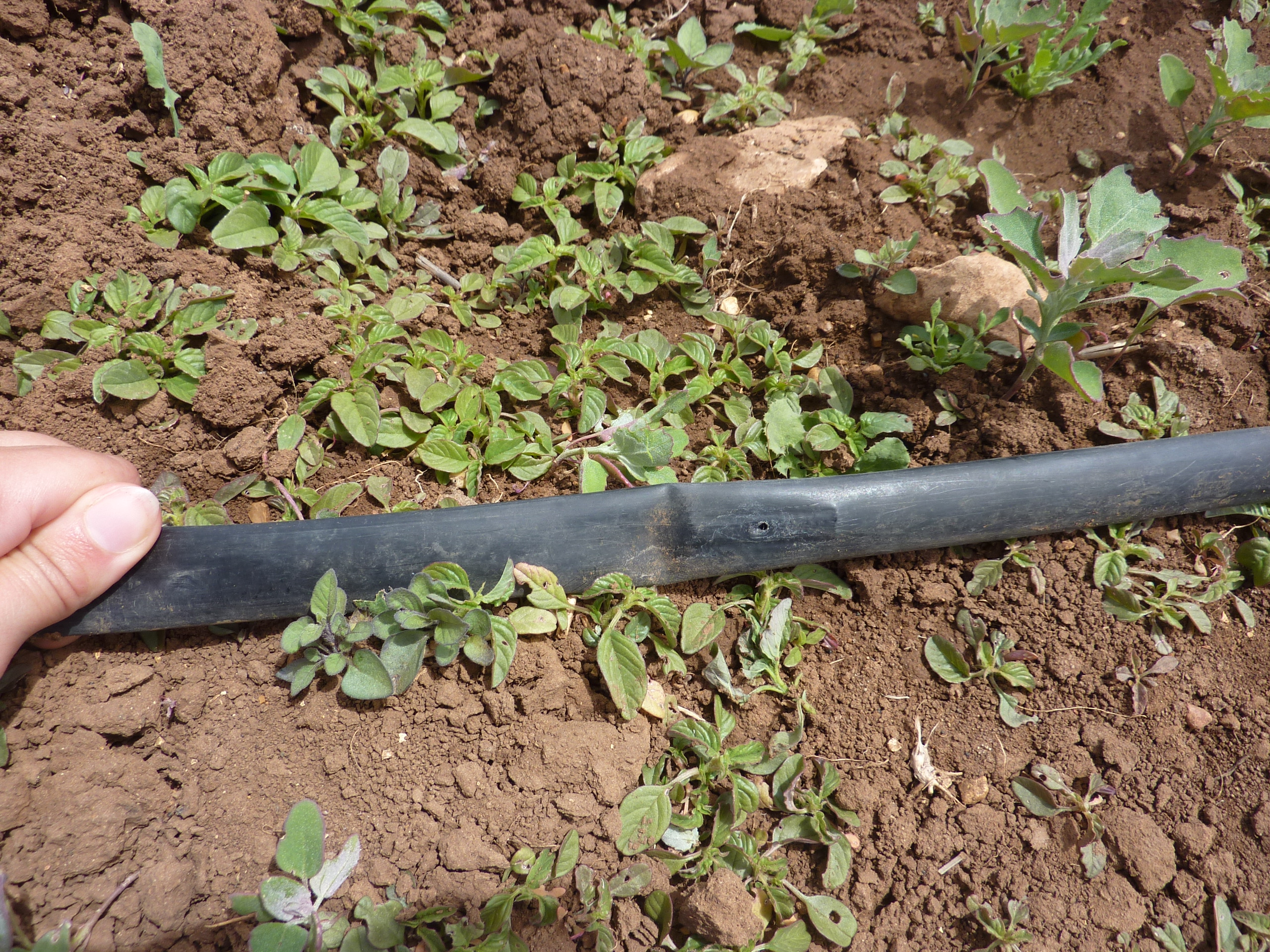
An example of sustainable irrigation (Drip Irrigation).

=== Building materials ===
When deciding what kind of building materials to put on a site it is important to recycle as often as possible, such as for example by reusing old bricks.

It is also important to be careful about what materials you use, especially if you plan to grow food crops. Old telephone poles and railroad ties have usually been treated with a toxic substance called creosote that can leach into the soils.

Sustainably harvested lumber is available, in which ecological, economic and social factors are integrated into the management of trees used for lumber.

=== Planting selection ===
One important part of sustainable landscaping is plant selection. Most of what makes a landscape unsustainable is the amount of inputs required to grow a non-native plant on it. What this means is that a local plant, which has adapted to local climate conditions, will require less work to flourish. Beyond native species, low-input, drought-tolerant plants like succulents and cacti (such as the fast-growing Echinopsis pachanoi) are better suited to survive.

Plants used as windbreaks can save up to 30% on heating costs in winter. They also help with shading a residence or commercial building in summer, create cool air through evapotranspiration and can cool hardscape areas such as driveways and sidewalks.

Irrigation is an excellent end-use option in greywater recycling and rainwater harvesting systems, and a composting toilet can cover (at least) some of the nutrient requirements. Not all fruit trees are suitable for greywater irrigation, as reclaimed greywater is typically of high pH and acidophile plants don't do well in alkaline environments.

Energy conservation may be achieved by placing broadleaf deciduous trees near the east, west and optionally north-facing walls of the house. Such selection provides shading in the summer while permitting large amounts of heat-carrying solar radiation to strike the house in the winter. The trees are to be placed as closely as possible to the house walls. As the efficiency of photovoltaic panels and passive solar heating is sensitive to shading, experts suggest the complete absence of trees near the south side.

Another choice would be that of a dense vegetative fence composed of evergreens (e.g. conifers) near that side from which cold continental winds blow and also that side from which the prevailing winds blow. Such a choice creates a winter windbreak that prevents low temperatures outside the house and reduces air infiltration towards the inside. Calculations show that placing the windbreak at a distance twice the height of the trees can reduce the wind velocity by 75%.

The above vegetative arrangements come with two disadvantages. Firstly, they minimize air circulation in summer although in many climates heating is more important and costly than cooling, and, secondly, they may affect the efficiency of photovoltaic panels. However, it has been estimated that if both arrangements are applied properly, they can reduce the overall house energy usage by up to 22%.

=== Sustainable lawns ===
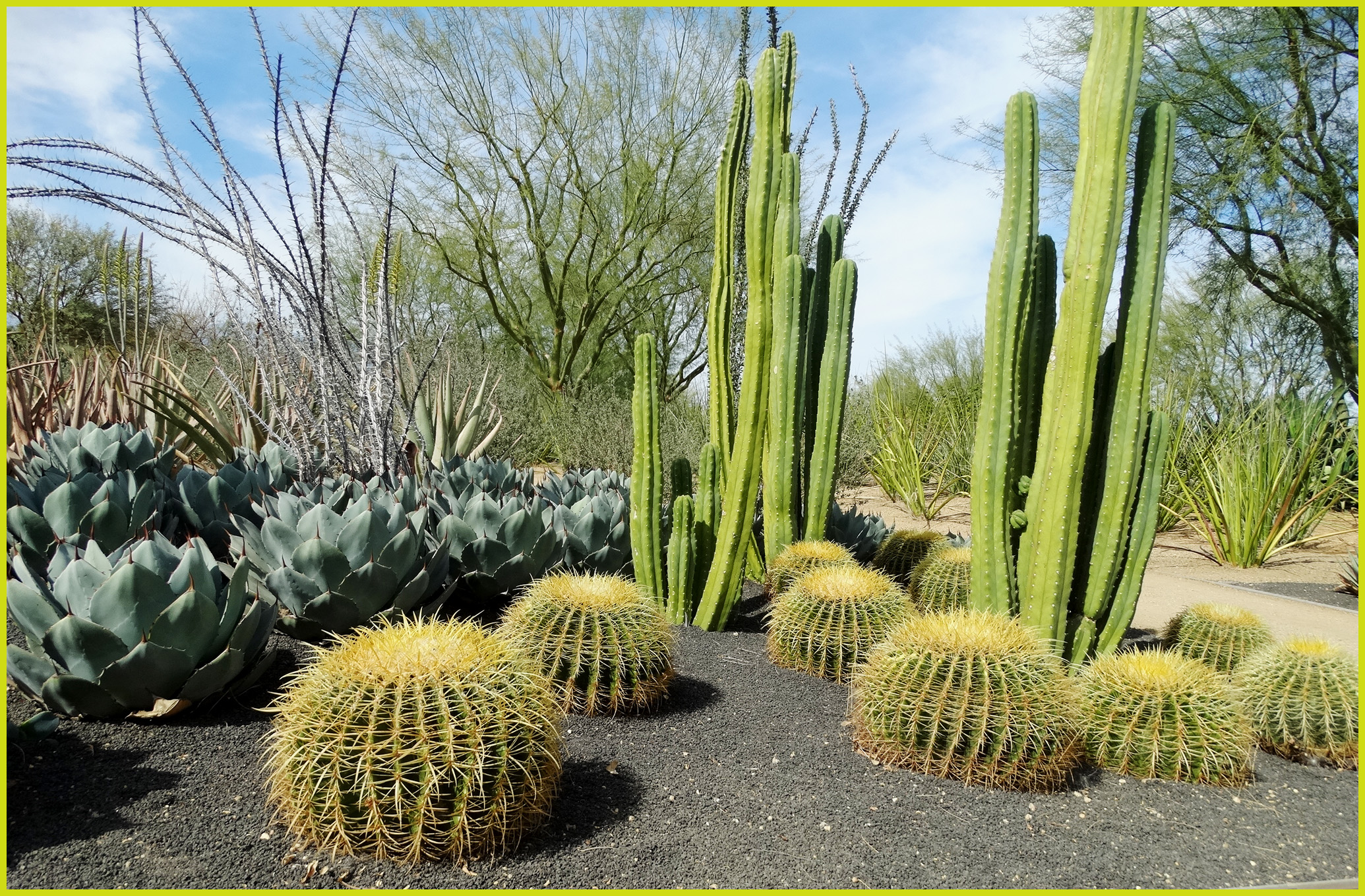
An example of a sustainable lawn

Lawns are often used as the center point of a landscape. While there are many different species of grass, only a limited amount are considered sustainable. Knowing the climate around the landscape is ideal for saving water and being sustainable. For example, in southern California having a grass lawn of tall fescue will typically need upwards of 1,365 cubic metres (360,500 US gal) of water. A lawn in the same place made up of mixed beds with various trees, shrubs, and ground cover will normally need 202 cubic metres (53,300 US gal) of water.

Having gravel, wood chips or bark, mulch, rubber mulch, artificial grass, patio, wood or composite deck, rock garden, or a succulent garden are all considered sustainable landscape techniques. Other species of plants other than grass that can take up a lawn are lantana, clover, creeping ivy, creeping thyme, oregano, rosemary hedges, silver pony foot, moneywort, chamomile, yarrow, creeping lily turf, ice plant, and stonecrop.

=== Maintenance ===
==== Pests ====
It is best to start with pest-free plant materials and supplies and close inspection of the plant upon purchase is recommended. Establishing diversity within the area of plant species will encourage populations of beneficial organisms (e.g. birds, insects), which feed on potential plant pests. Attracting a wide variety of organisms with a variety of host plants has shown to be effective in increasing pollinator presence in agriculture. Because plant pests vary from plant to plant, assessing the problem correctly is half the battle. The owner must consider whether the plant can tolerate the damage caused by the pest. If not, then does the plant justify some sort of treatment? Physical barriers may help. Landscape managers should make use of Integrated Pest Management to reduce the use of pesticides and herbicides.

==== Pruning ====
Proper pruning will increase air circulation and may decrease the likelihood of plant diseases. However, improper pruning is detrimental to shrubs and trees.

== Programs ==
There are several programs in place that are open to participation by various groups. For example, the Audubon Cooperative Sanctuary Program for golf courses, the Audubon Green Neighborhoods Program, and the National Wildlife Federation’s Backyard Habitat Program, to name a few.

The Sustainable Sites Initiative, began in 2005, provides a points-based certification for landscapes, similar to the LEED program for buildings operated by the Green Building Council. It has guidelines and performance benchmarks.

== See also ==
- Horticulture – Small-scale cultivation of plants
- Organic lawn management – Caring for an turf field or lawn and landscape using organic horticulture
- Ecoscaping – Spatial planning discipline
- Foodscaping – Ornamental landscaping with edible plants
- Naturescaping – Method of landscape design that involves incorporating native plants into one's yard
- Sustainable gardening
- Climate-friendly gardening – Gardening practices that aim to reduce and mitigate climate change
