= Brooksvale Park =

Park in Hamden, Connecticut, United States

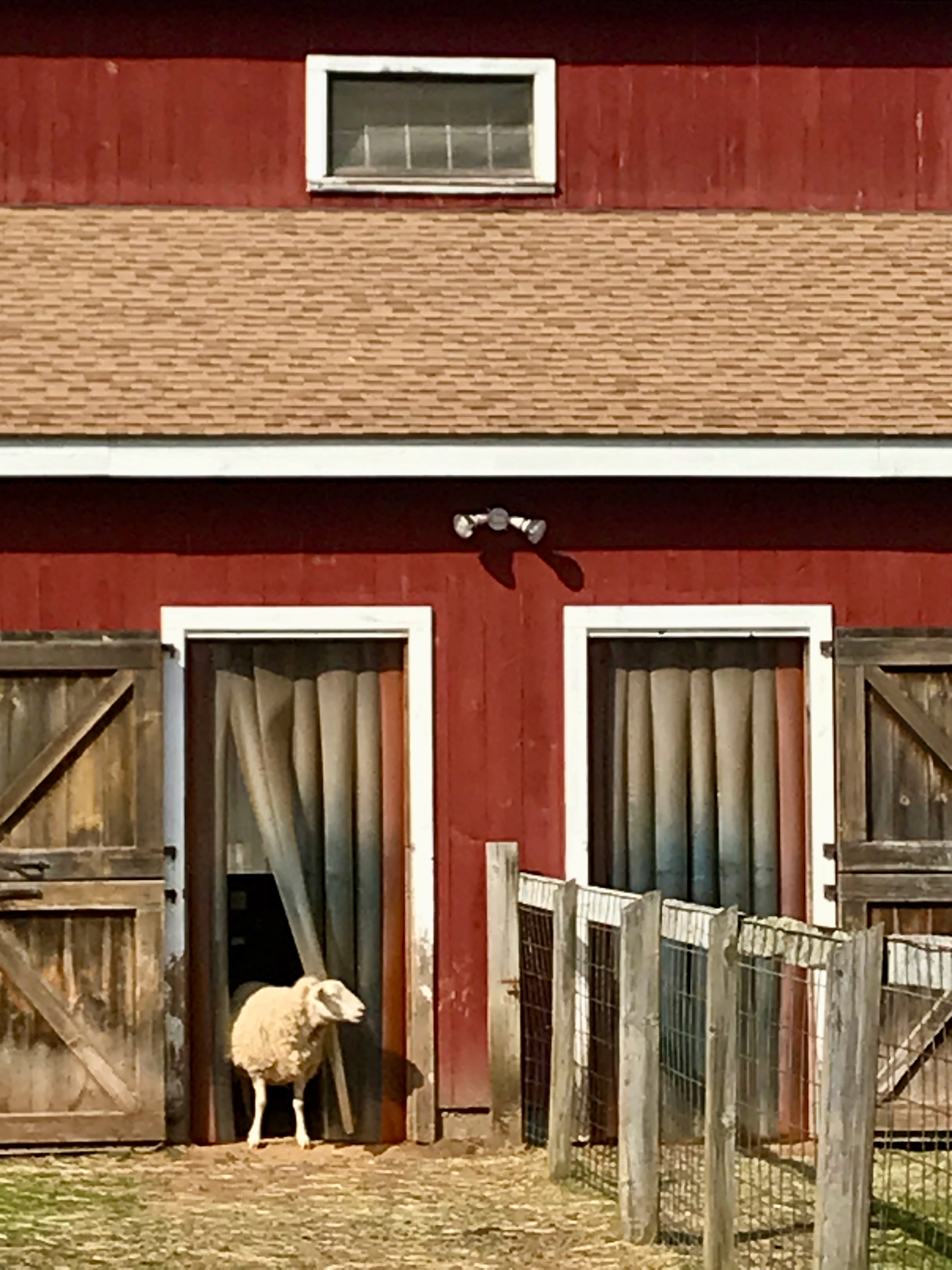
- Brooksvale Park's sheep pen in April 2023
- Interactive map of Brooksvale Park
- Location: Hamden, New Haven County, Connecticut, United States
- Coordinates: 41.4562082°N 72.9248253°W
- Elevation: 325 feet (99 m)

Brooksvale Park is a municipal park in the northwestern corner of Hamden, Connecticut, in the Northeastern United States. It covers an area of over 500 acres and is operated by the Hamden Parks and Recreation Department. The park is home to a wide variety of recreational activities and natural features, including hiking trails, fishing ponds, a nature center, community garden and a working farm.

The park shares a border with the Mt. Sanford Block of Naugatuck State Forest to the west and is connected via a cross walk across Brooksvale Avenue with the Farmington Canal State Park Trail to the east. Cheshire Connecticut adjoins the park's northern border.

== History ==
The land that is now Brooksvale Park was once part of a farm owned by the Brooks family, who settled in the area in the early 18th century. In the early 20th century, the Brooks family began selling off parts of their land, and in 1958, the Town of Hamden purchased the remaining 54 acres to create a public park. In 2003, Friends of Brooksvale Park was organized.

== Facilities ==
Brooksvale Park offers a wide range of recreational opportunities for visitors of all ages. The park features several hiking trails that wind through wooded areas and along the banks of the park's two ponds, which are stocked with fish for catch-and-release fishing. The park also has a playground, athletic fields, picnic areas, and a pavilion that can be rented for private events.

The park's nature center, located in a historic barn on the property, offers educational programs and exhibits on the local flora and fauna. The center features live animals, including snakes, turtles, and birds of prey, and offers guided hikes and other activities throughout the year.

The working farm at Brooksvale Park is a popular attraction for visitors. The farm features a variety of animals, including cows, sheep, pigs, goats, chickens, and horses. Visitors can watch farm activities such as milking cows, shearing sheep, and feeding the animals. The farm also sells fresh produce and eggs, as well as locally made products such as honey and maple syrup.

== Events ==
Throughout the year, Brooksvale Park hosts a variety of events and activities for the community. In the spring, the park holds a maple sugaring festival, where visitors can learn about the process of making maple syrup and sample fresh maple products.

In the fall, the park hosts a harvest festival, featuring hayrides, pumpkin decorating, and other seasonal activities.

== Conservation ==
Brooksvale Park is committed to preserving the natural environment and promoting sustainable practices. The park has implemented several initiatives to reduce its environmental impact, including composting food waste from the farm, using organic fertilizers, organic pest control methods, organic lawn management and providing recycling and composting bins throughout the park.

== Defunct ski tow rope ==
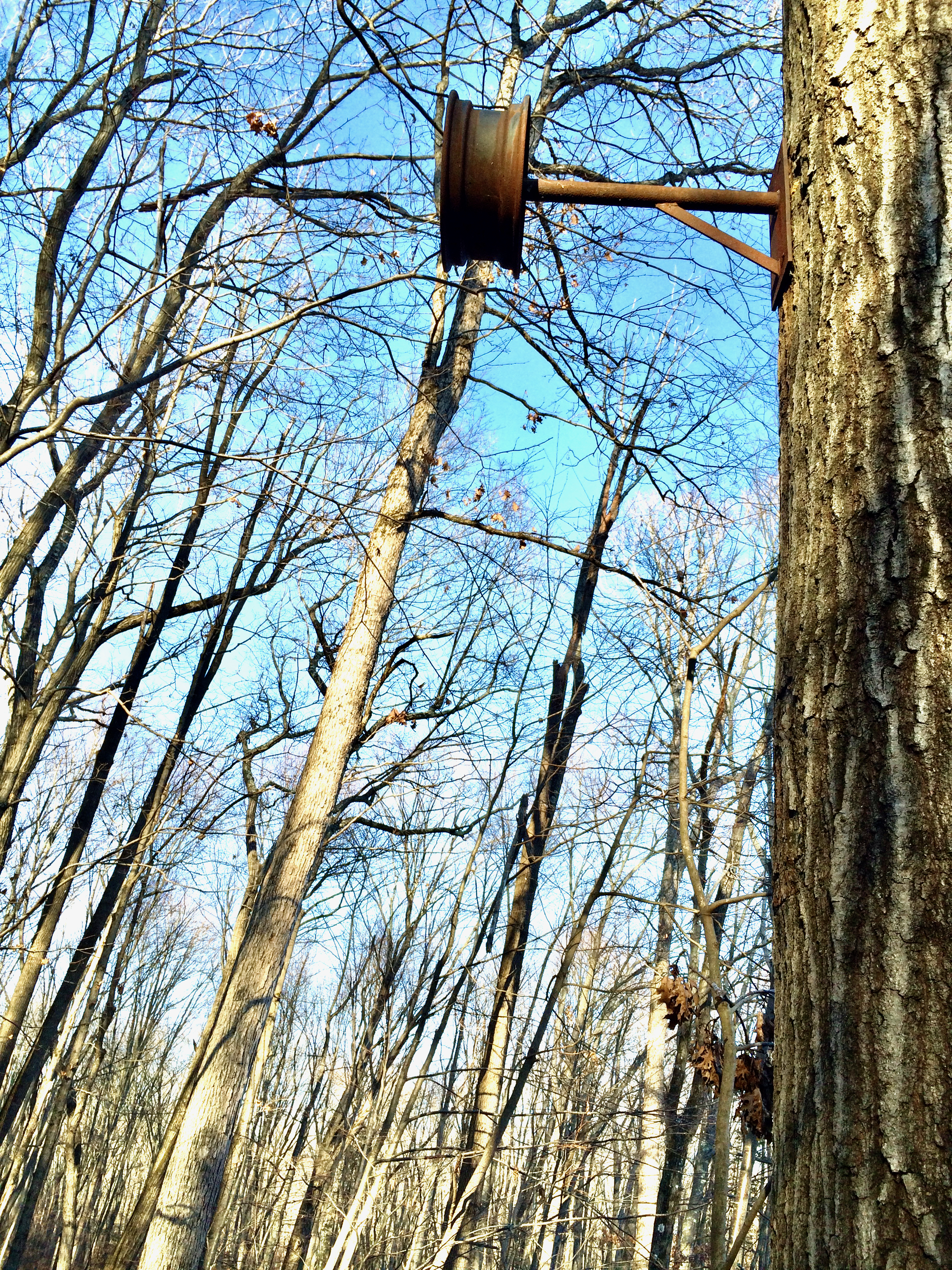
Defunct tow rope pulley

During the 1950s and 1960s, the park gained popularity for its unique addition of a ski slope, which attracted many recreational enthusiasts. In 1969 a ski tow rope was added to the slope.

Although the ski slope is no longer operational, visitors to the park can still see the remnants of its infrastructure, including portions of the rope tow that transported skiers to the top of the hill.

Also, in the many winter families bring young children with sleds and snow saucers to slide on the park's athletic fields. The large gently sloping hill near the park's main entrance has a slight elevation at the rest rooms with a very gradual drop ending before the barnyard's parking lot.
