= Fertilizer tree =

Fertilizer trees are used in agroforestry to improve the condition of soils used for farming. As woody legumes, they capture nitrogen from the air and put it in the soil through their roots and falling leaves. They can also bring nutrients from deep in the soil up to the surface for crops with roots that cannot reach that depth. Fertilizer trees are further useful for preventing fertilizer erosion, soil degradation and related desertification, and improving water usage for crops.

Sesbania, Gliricidia, Tephrosia, and Faidherbia albida are known as fertilizer trees. Tree lucerne or tagasaste (Cytisus proliferus) is able to fix more than 587 kg. of nitrogen per hectare per year. It can increase maize (corn) yields from 1 ton per hectare per year to more than 10 tons per ha/year in areas with more than 850 mm. of rain per year or a perched water table. Tree lucerne is also used to create and maintain terra preta.

== Use in Africa ==
The use of Faidherbia albida in Malawi and Zambia has resulted in a doubling or even tripling of maize yields. As part of evergreen agriculture, use of fertilizer trees is proposed as a means to improve food security. Niger has more than 4.8 million hectares of predominantly Faidherbia agroforests, while Zambia has 300,000 hectares. In Zambia and Malawi, farmers plant the trees in a checkerboard pattern every 30 feet.

Fertilizer trees are used to prevent the expansion of desert, and to keep agriculture viable in arid lands in many African countries.

== See also ==
- Agroforestry
- Ecoscaping
- Green manure, fertilization with herbaceous legumes
