= Vineyard Golf Club =

Golf course in Martha's Vineyard, Massachusetts

Coordinates: 41°23′27″N 70°33′29″W

The Vineyard Golf Club on Martha's Vineyard, Massachusetts, opened in 2002 and uses no synthetic pesticides, fertilizers or herbicides making it the only organic golf course in the U.S. that uses organic turf management.

== History ==
Fearing pollution of the island's only aquifer, community members required the Vineyard Golf Club use organic management before permitting it to open.

The superintendent at the Vineyard Golf Club from 2002-2015, Jeff Carlson, was the recipient of the 2003 GCSAA/Golf Digest Environmental Leaders in Golf Award and is the 2008 winner of the President's Award for Environmental Stewardship. Carlson has used the course as a test site for new maintenance practices and products which have helped other courses become more environmentally friendly.

Kevin Banks succeeded Carlson as superintendent in 2015.

== Recognition ==
The Vineyard Golf Club gained further press coverage in 2009 when President Barack Obama played the course, and then in 2010 when he returned to Martha's Vineyard and played the course multiple times.

Golf Magazine published a report about organic golf courses and reported that golfers have unrealistic expectations of golf course greens, which causes the use of pesticides by course superintendents. Researchers Kit Wheeler and John Nauright call this phenomenon “Augusta National Syndrome.”
