= Ecoscaping =

Spatial planning discipline

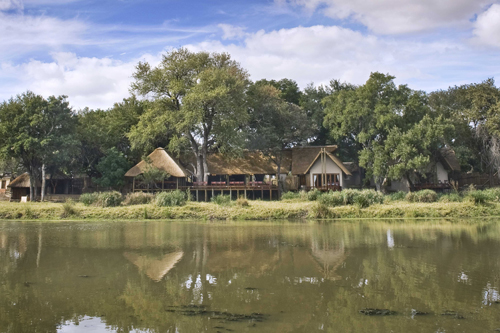
Landscape architecture

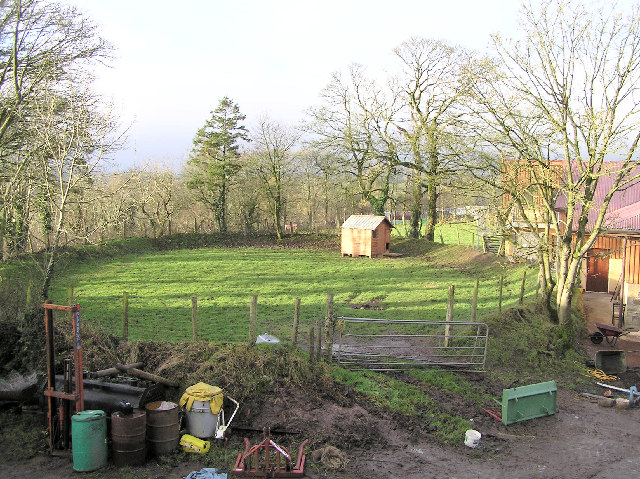
Ecoscaping integrates architectural planning and effective use of resources.

Ecoscaping is a spatial planning discipline that integrates landscape architecture and environmental science to create sustainable designs or construction.

The approach is holistic and strives to respect the pre-existing materials, microenvironments, and structures (backyards, cities, campuses, etc.) in sustainable land use management with ecological balance. Ecoscaping searches for solutions to improve the look of a property while making minimal impact on the surrounding environment, protecting biodiversity and wildlife habitats, achieving nature conservation.

== Techniques ==
Examples of Ecoscaping techniques include:

- Using natural products instead of artificial decoration
- Planting trees and minimizing the use of pesticides and artificial fertilizers
- Creating out-buildings, decks, trellises, etc. that work in with the land.
- Rainwater harvesting
- Creating self-contained water reservoirs for water balance.

== Significance ==
Building and rebuilding based on nature, sustainable development, and human aesthetics, ecoscaping provides an alternative to harsh land use practices with ecologically adverse effects, such as impervious surfaces, soil compaction, contamination, and urban sprawl.

== See also ==
- Agroforestry – Land use management system
- Desert greening – Process of man-made reclamation of deserts
- Ecological engineering – Environmental engineering
- Fertilizer tree
- Riparian buffer – Vegetated area near a stream, usually forested
- Sustainable landscaping – Low maintenance landscaping
