= Organic horticulture =

Organic cultivation of fruit, vegetables, flowers or ornamental plants

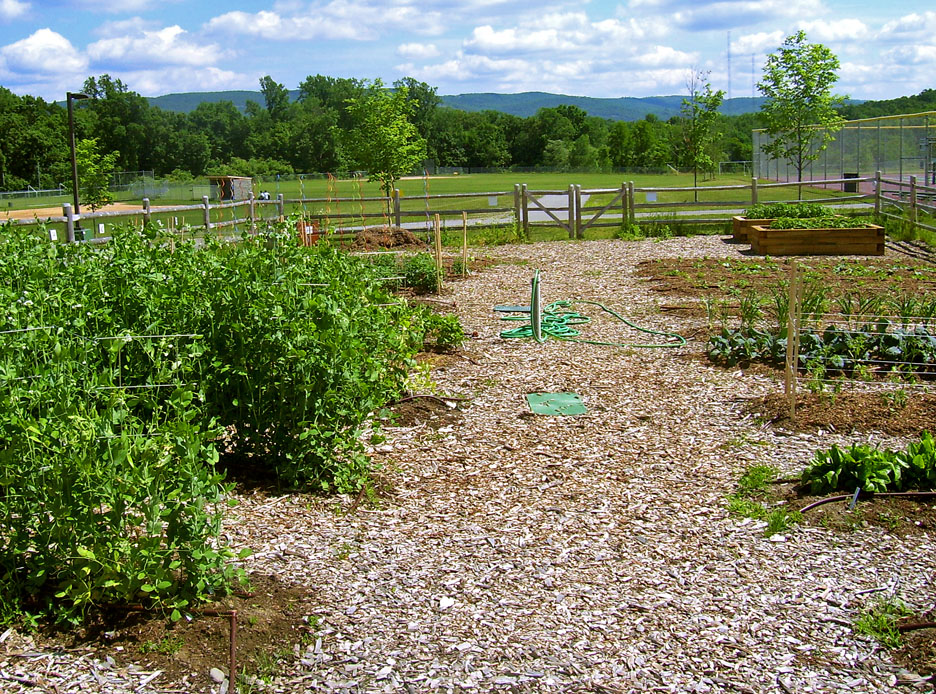
An organic garden on a school campus

Organic horticulture is the science and art of growing fruits, vegetables, flowers, or ornamental plants by following the essential principles of organic agriculture in soil building and conservation, pest management, and heirloom variety preservation.

The Latin words hortus (garden plant) and cultura (culture) together form horticulture, classically defined as the culture or growing of garden plants. Horticulture is also sometimes defined simply as "agriculture minus the plough". Instead of the plough, horticulture makes use of human labour and gardener's hand tools, although some small machine tools like rotary tillers are commonly employed now.

== General ==
Mulches, cover crops, compost, manures, vermicompost, and mineral supplements are soil-building mainstays that distinguish this type of farming from its conventional counterpart. Through attention to good healthy soil condition, it is expected that insect, fungal, or other problems that sometimes plague plants can be minimized. However, pheromone traps, insecticidal soap sprays, and other pest-control methods available to organic farmers are also utilized by organic horticulturists.

Horticulture involves five areas of study: floriculture (includes production and marketing of floral crops), landscape horticulture (includes production, marketing and maintenance of landscape plants), olericulture (includes production and marketing of vegetables), pomology (includes production and marketing of fruits), and postharvest physiology (involves maintaining quality and preventing spoilage of horticultural crops). All of these can be, and sometimes are, pursued according to the principles of organic cultivation.

Organic horticulture (or organic gardening) is based on knowledge and techniques gathered over thousands of years. In general terms, organic horticulture involves natural processes, often taking place over extended periods of time, and a sustainable, holistic approach – while chemical-based horticulture focuses on immediate, isolated effects and reductionist strategies.

== Organic gardening systems ==
There are a number of formal organic gardening and farming systems that prescribe specific techniques. They tend to be more specific than, and fit within, general organic standards. Forest gardening, a fully organic food production system which dates from prehistoric times, is thought to be the world's oldest and most resilient agroecosystem.

Biodynamic farming is an approach based on the esoteric teachings of Rudolf Steiner. The Japanese farmer and writer Masanobu Fukuoka invented a no-till system for small-scale grain production that he called Natural Farming. French intensive gardening, biointensive methods, and SPIN Farming (Small Plot INtensive) are all small scale gardening techniques. These techniques were brought to the United States by Alan Chadwick in the 1930s. A garden is more than just a means of providing food; it is a model of what is possible in a community – everyone could have a garden of some kind (container, growing box, raised bed) and produce healthy, nutritious organic food, a farmers market, a place to pass on gardening experience, and a sharing of bounty, promoting a more sustainable way of living that would encourage their local economy. A simple 4' x 8' (32 square feet) raised bed garden based on the principles of bio-intensive planting and square foot gardening uses fewer nutrients and less water, and could keep a family, or community, supplied with an abundance of healthy, nutritious organic greens, while promoting a more sustainable way of living.

Organic gardening is designed to work with the ecological systems and minimally disturb the Earth's natural balance. Because of this organic farmers have been interested in reduced-tillage methods. Conventional agriculture uses mechanical tillage, which is ploughing or sowing, which is harmful to the environment. The impact of tilling in organic farming is much less of an issue. Ploughing speeds up erosion because the soil remains uncovered for a long period of time and if it has a low content of organic matter, the structural stability of the soil decreases. Organic farmers use techniques such as mulching, planting cover crops, and intercropping, to maintain a soil cover throughout most of the year. The use of compost, manure mulch and other organic fertilizers yields a higher organic content of soils on organic farms and helps limit soil degradation and erosion.

Methods such as composting or vermicomposting can also be used to supplement a garden. These practices are ways of recycling organic matter into organic fertilizers and soil conditioner. The byproduct of vermicomposting is also an source of nutrients for an organic garden.

== Organic lawn management systems ==
Organic horticulture techniques are used to maintain lawns and turf fields organically as required by certain laws and management plans. Beginning in the late 20th century, some large properties and municipalities required organic lawn management and organic horticulture in the maintenance of both public and private parks and properties. Some locations require organic lawn management and organic horticulture.

== Pest control approaches ==
Differing approaches to pest control are equally notable. In chemical horticulture, a specific insecticide may be applied to quickly kill off a particular insect pest. Chemical controls can dramatically reduce pest populations in the short term, yet by unavoidably killing (or starving) natural control insects and animals, cause an increase in the pest population in the long term, thereby creating an ever-increasing problem. Repeated use of insecticides and herbicides also encourages rapid natural selection of resistant insects, plants and other organisms, necessitating increased use, or requiring new, more powerful controls.

In contrast, organic horticulture tends to tolerate some pest populations while taking the long view. Organic pest control requires a thorough understanding of pest life cycles and interactions, and involves the cumulative effect of many techniques, including:

- Allowing for an acceptable level of pest damage
- Encouraging predatory beneficial insects to flourish and eat pests
- Encouraging beneficial microorganisms
- Careful plant selection, choosing disease-resistant varieties
- Planting companion crops that discourage or divert pests
- Using row covers to protect crop plants during pest migration periods
- Rotating crops to different locations from year to year to interrupt pest reproduction cycles
- Using insect traps to monitor and control insect populations

Each of these techniques also provides other benefits, such as soil protection and improvement, fertilization, pollination, water conservation and season extension. These benefits are both complementary and cumulative in overall effect on site health. Organic pest control and biological pest control can be used as part of integrated pest management (IPM). However, IPM can include the use of chemical pesticides that are not part of organic or biological techniques.

== Impact on the global food supply ==
One controversy associated with organic food production is the matter of the amount of food produced per acre. Even with good organic practices, organic agriculture may be five to twenty-five percent less productive than conventional agriculture, depending on the crop.

Much of the productivity advantage of conventional agriculture is associated with the use of nitrogen fertilizer. However, the use, and especially the overuse, of nitrogen fertilizer has negative effects such as nitrogen runoff harming natural water supplies and increased global warming.

Organic methods have other advantages, such as healthier soil, that may make organic farming more resilient, and therefore more reliable in producing food, in the face of challenges such as climate change.

As well, world hunger is not primarily an issue of agricultural yields, but distribution and waste.

== See also ==
- List of organic gardening and farming topics
- List of organic food topics
- Organic lawn management
