= Organic lawn management =

Caring for an turf field or lawn and landscape using organic horticulture

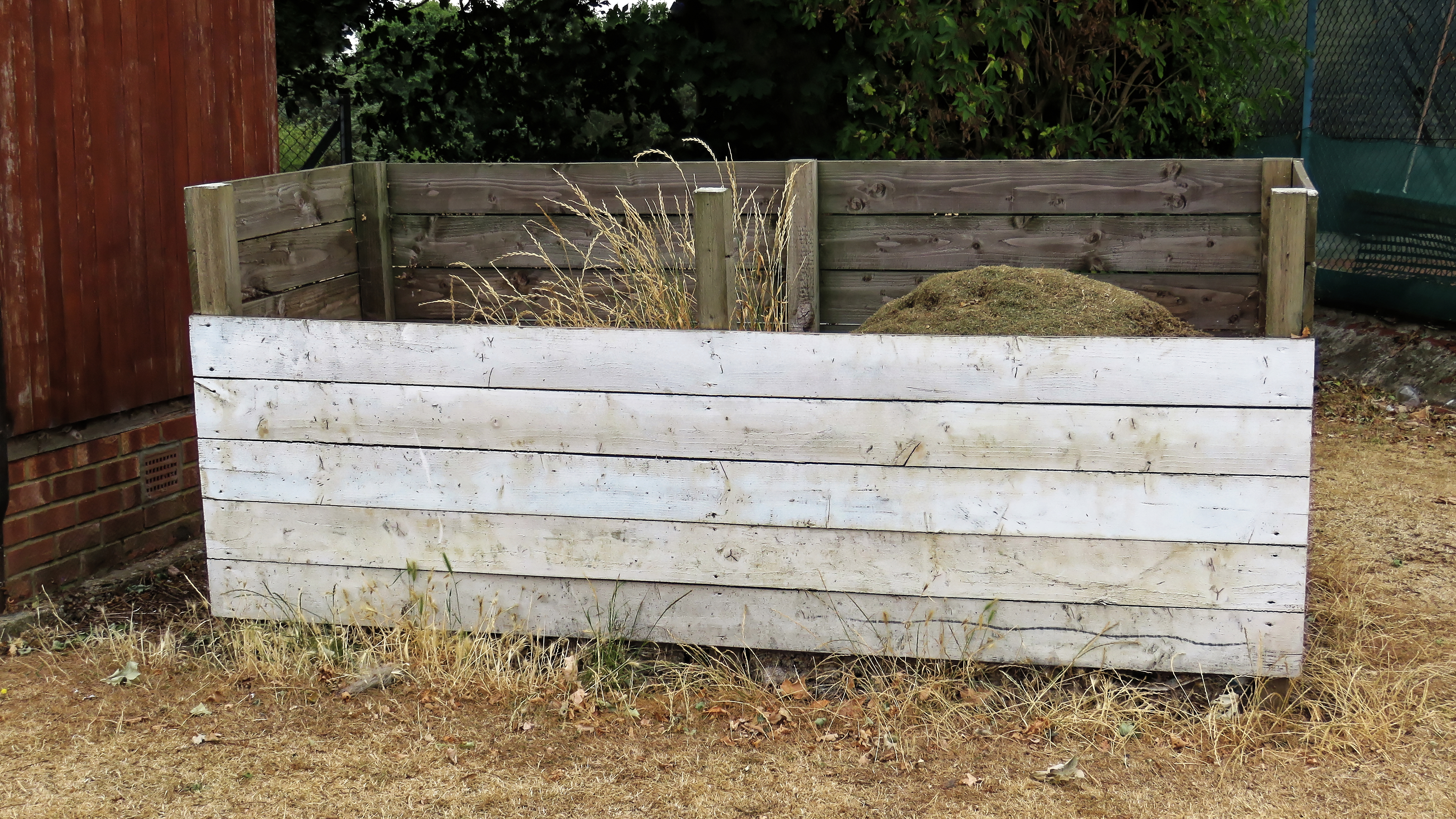
Compost bin

Organic lawn management or organic turf management or organic land care or organic landscaping is the practice of establishing and caring for an athletic turf field or garden lawn and landscape using organic horticulture, without the use of manufactured inputs such as synthetic pesticides or artificial fertilizers. It is a component of organic land care and organic sustainable landscaping which adapt the principles and methods of sustainable gardening and organic farming to the care of lawns and gardens. Since the late 20th century, a number of municipalities and large properties have required organic land management and have banned synthetic pesticide use.

== Techniques ==
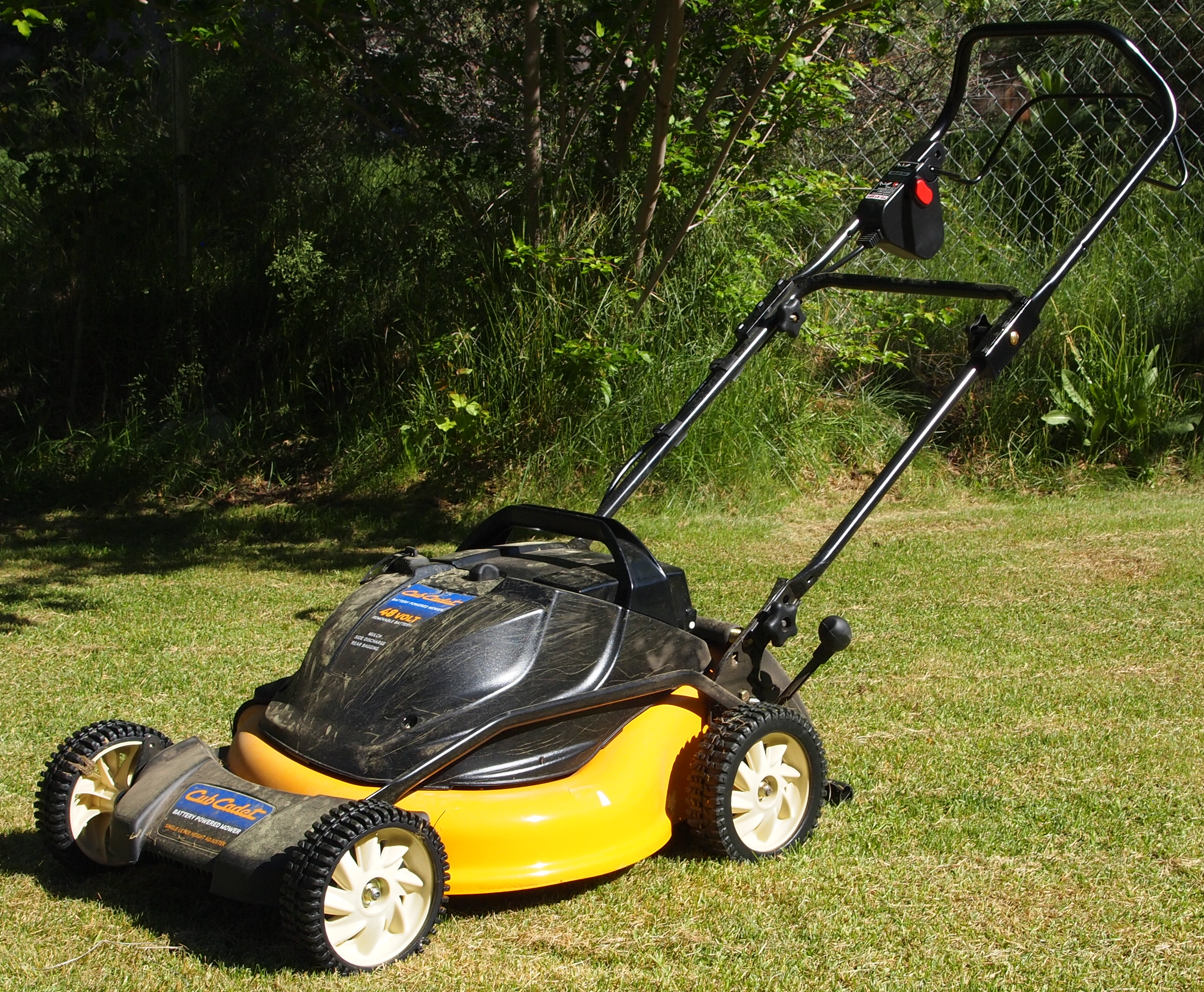
Rechargeable electric mulching-mower

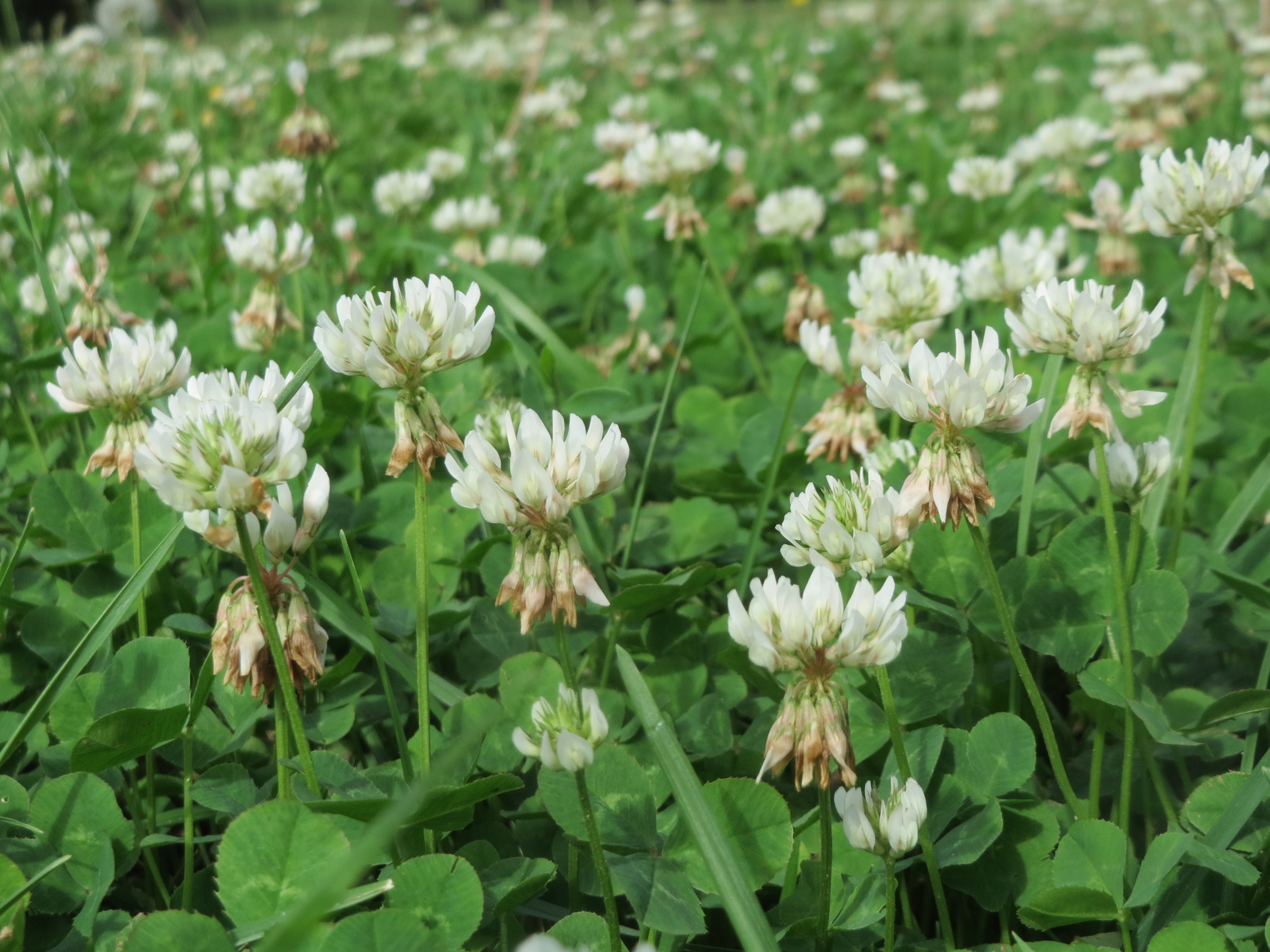
White clover lawn

A primary element of organic lawn management is the use of compost and compost tea to reduce the need for fertilization and to encourage healthy soil that enables turf to resist pests. A second element is mowing tall, e.g. to a height of 80–100 mm (3–4 in), to suppress weeds and encourage deep grass roots, and leaving grass clippings and leaves on the lawn as fertilizer.

Additional techniques include fertilizing in the fall, not the spring. Organic lawns often benefit from overseeding (adding more seeds over top of the existing vegetation), slice seeding (slits are made in the soil into which seeds are deposited) and aeration more frequently due to the importance of a strong root system. Well-maintained organic lawns are often drought-tolerant. If a lawn does need watering it should be done infrequently but deeply.

Other organic techniques for caring for a lawn include irrigation only when the lawn shows signs of drought stress and then watering deeply – minimizing needless water consumption. Using low volume sprinklers provides more penetration without runoff. Lawnmowers with a mulching function can useful in reducing fertilizer use by allowing grass clippings and leaves that are cut so minutely that they can settle into the grass inconspicuously to decompose into the soil.

=== Clover lawns ===
Grass seed mixes used to contain white clover, which provides natural fertilizer, but this practice fell out of favor with the rise of synthetic fertilizer and businesses profiting from the sale of this fertilizer. In recent years, homeowners have returned to the use of clover as a natural fertilization source for lawns. In 2022, The New York Times reported on the growing popularity of clover lawns. The New York Times reported "#cloverlawn has over 65 million views on TikTok."

=== Organic pesticides ===
Organic land managers may use registered pesticides approved under the National Organic Program in their lawn care programs. These pesticides are generally derived from natural materials and are minimally-processed. Alternatives include the use of beneficial insects and natural predators such as nematodes to prevent infestation of lawns with pests such as crane fly larvae and ants. Pesticides are allowed under the NOFA Standards for organic land care but not always used in organic lawn care because proper cultural practices can keep pest populations below action thresholds, such as preventing fungal infections using physical maintenance techniques such as effective mowing and raking.

=== Organic fertilizers ===
Synthetic (inorganic based) fertilizers are made in chemical processes, some of which use fossil fuels and contribute to global warming. They also greatly increase the amount of nitrogen entering the global nitrogen cycle which has a serious negative impact on the organization and functioning of the world's ecosystems, including accelerating the loss of biological diversity and decline of coastal marine ecosystems and fisheries. Nitrogen fertilizer releases N_{2}O, a greenhouse gas, into the atmosphere after application. Organic fertilizer nitrogen content is typically lower than synthetic fertilizer.

=== Biodiversity ===
Organic lawns contribute to biodiversity, by definition, when they contain more than one or two grass species. Examples of additional lawn and grasslike species that can be encouraged in organic lawns include dozens of grass species (eight for ryegrass alone, sedges, mosses, clover, vetches, trefoils, yarrow, ground cover alternatives, and other mowable plants). Biodiversity increases the functioning and stress tolerance of ecosystems. Lack of biodiversity is a significant environmental issue brought up by the use of lawns with grassroots groups emerging to promote this method of lawn care. Certain low-growing grass species can also eliminate the need for mowing, thus also being environmentally friendly. Clover is often mixed with grasses for its ability to fix nitrogen into the soil and fertilize the lawn.

== No Mow May ==
No Mow May is a campaign to encourage homeowners to not mow their lawns during the month of May to support pollinators, native plants and wildlife diversity. The campaign was started in 2019 by Plantlife, a nature conservation charity based in the United Kingdom. In 2020, the city of Appleton, Wisconsin stopped mowing for the month of May. In 2022, cities around the United States participated in No Mow May. The campaign is supported by the Xerces Society through its Bee City USA program, and has described the movement as a "gateway" to creating better habitat for bees when adapted to local conditions and including native wildflowers.

== Locations with organic lawns and pesticide ordinances ==
Many small properties with lawns around the world are maintained using organic techniques. In the late 20th century, a movement to manage lawns organically began to grow. Some large properties and municipalities require organic lawn management and organic landscaping and have enacted pesticide ordinances. Locations with organic lawn management plans or pesticide ordinances include:

=== Ryton Organic Gardens, Ryton-on-Dunsmore, Warwickshire, England ===
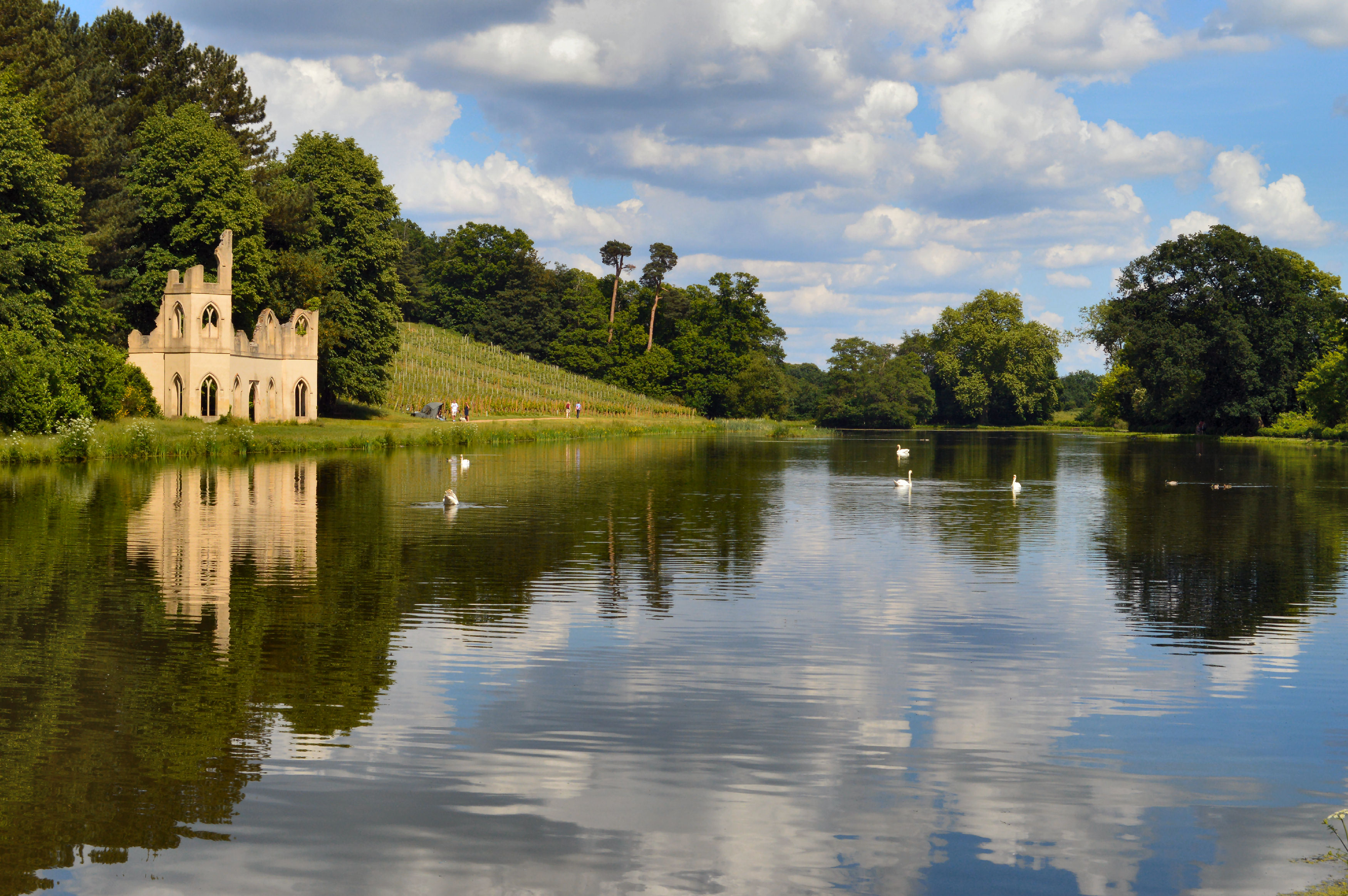
A view of Painshill Park over the lake towards the vineyard

In 1985, the nonprofit Garden Organic, formerly known as the Henry Doubleday Research Association, relocated to its present site where it operates organic, landscaped grounds open to the public. The property is owned by Coventry University.

=== Highgrove House estate, Gloucestershire, England ===
In 1996, King Charles III, then the Prince of Wales, had transitioned the Highgrove House estate's farm and gardens to organic management.

=== Painshill, Cobham, Surrey, England ===
In 1998, Painshill was awarded the Europa Nostra Medal for its restoration of the 18th century organic gardens originally designed by Charles Hamilton between 1738 and 1773 using what today are called organic methods.

=== Common Ground Education Center, Unity, Maine, United States ===
In 1998, the Maine Organic Farmers and Gardeners Association acquired the 300 acre property in Unity, Maine, and converted the land to organic demonstration fields, gardens, orchards, shade trees and low-impact forestry woodlots. It is the site of the annual Common Ground Country Fair, a fair showcasing organic food and farming.

=== Brooksvale Park, Hamden, Connecticut, United States ===
In 2003, Friends of Brooksvale Park formed to support the 500-acre park and implement environmental programming and initiatives, including organic practices and the Brooksvale Organic Garden, which produces vegetables for soup kitchens and food banks.

=== Vineyard Golf Club, Martha's Vineyard, Massachusetts, United States ===
In 2002, the Vineyard Golf Club opened on Martha's Vineyard with the requirement that it use organic turf management. The first course superintendent, Jeff Carlson, was the recipient of the 2003 GCSAA/Golf Digest Environmental Leaders in Golf Award and is the 2008 winner of the President's Award for Environmental Stewardship.

=== Harvard University, Massachusetts, United States ===
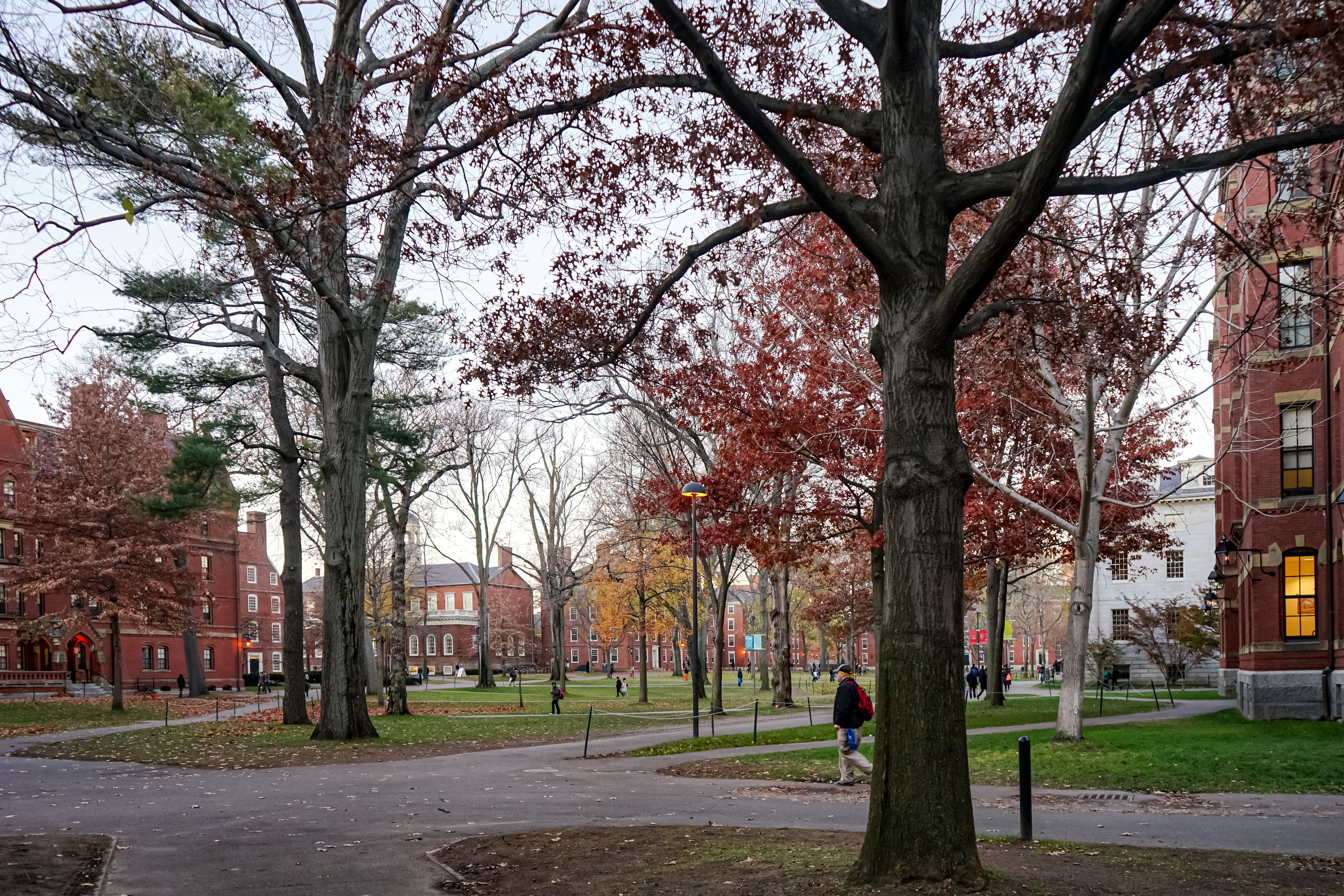
Harvard Yard in autumn

In 2009, The New York Times reported on Harvard University's decision to use organic management on all their grounds, which was championed by President Drew Gilpin Faust and implemented by landscape director Wayne Carbone. The New York Times noted: "Thanks to these efforts, the university has reduced the use of irrigation by 30 percent, according to Mr. Carbone, thus saving two million gallons of water a year. And the 40-year-old orchards at Elmwood, which have been treated with compost tea, are recovering from leaf spot and apple scab, two ailments that had afflicted them."

=== High Line, Manhattan, New York, United States ===
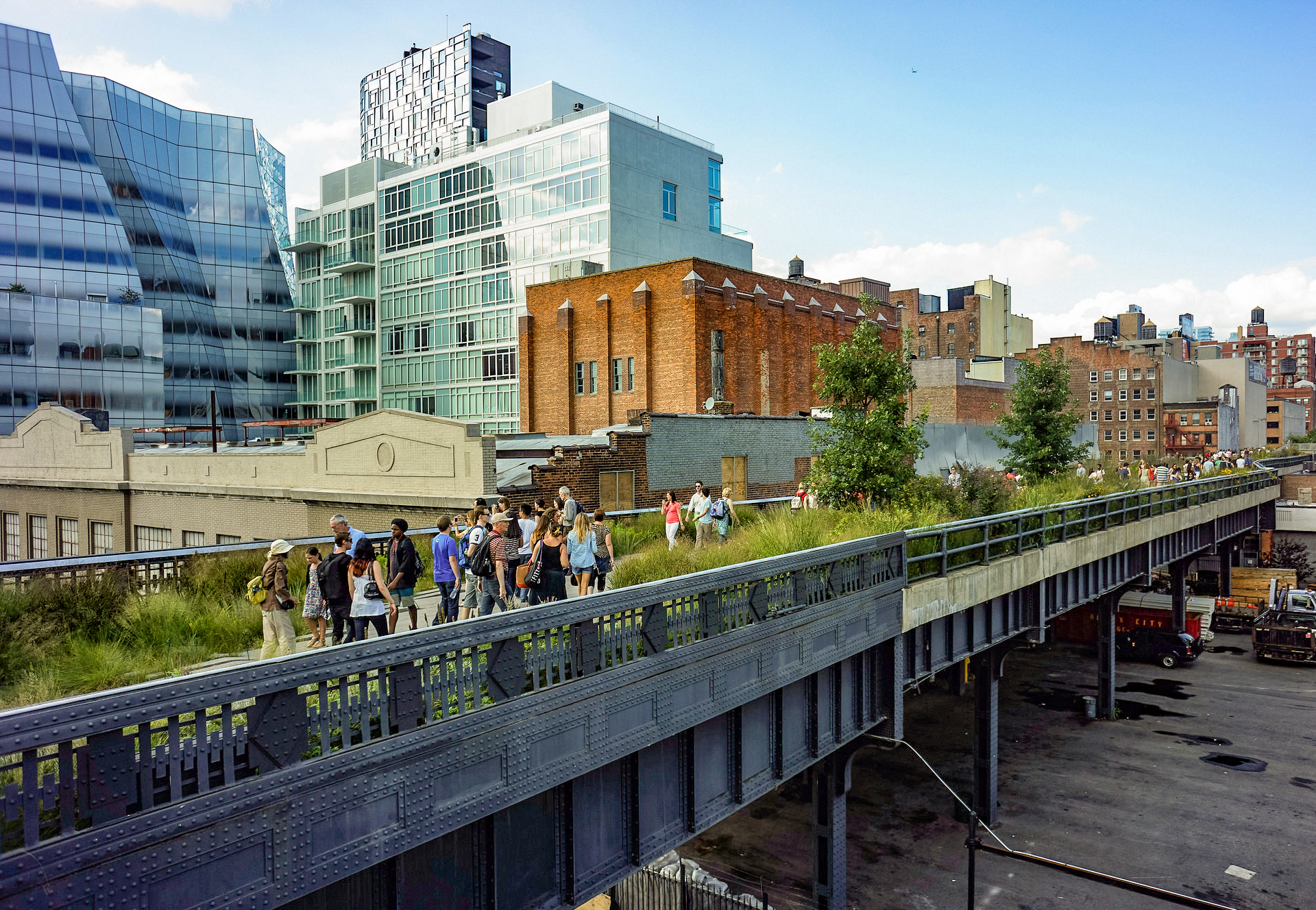
High Line, New York City

In 2009, the first section of the organically-managed 1.45 mile linear park the High Line opened on the former New York Central Railroad, an elevated train line spur, on the west side of Manhattan in New York City. The High Line's design is a collaboration between James Corner Field Operations, Diller Scofidio + Renfro, and Piet Oudolf.

=== Takoma Park, Maryland, United States ===
Residents Catherine Cummings and Julie Taddeo began a campaign in 2011 to restrict lawncare pesticide use in Takoma Park, Maryland. City council members Seth Grimes and Tim Male quickly got behind the effort and drafted Takoma Park's Safe Grow Act of 2013, leading to the city council's enactment of the law, which went into effect March 1, 2014.

=== Ogunquit, Maine, United States ===
In 2014, Bill and Judy Baker and other residents convinced the Ogunquit Town Council to pass a strict pesticide ban requiring organic land care on both public and private property.

=== Montgomery County, Maryland, United States ===
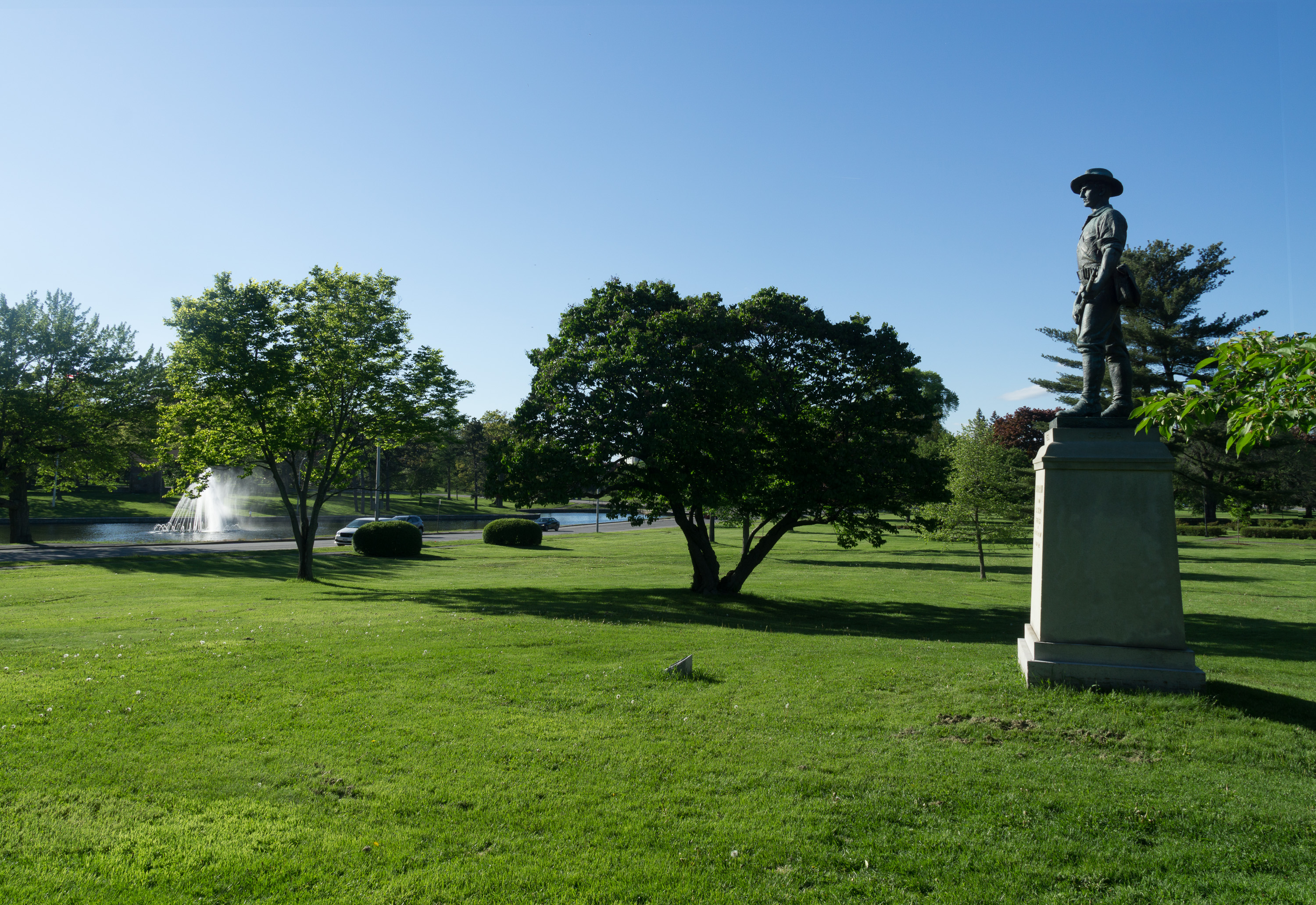
Deering Oaks in Portland, Maine

In 2015, Julie Taddeo and Catherine Cummings and Safe Grow Montgomery colleagues campaigned to get Montgomery County, Maryland to adopt a pesticide ban that required organic lawn management throughout the county on both public and private property. Montgomery County Council President George Leventhal (D-at-large) wrote and introduced Bill 52-14, based on Takoma Park's 2013 legislation. The county council enacted Bill 52-14 that October. The ban was challenged in court by local lawn care companies and pesticide industry lobbying group Responsible Industry for a Sound Environment (RISE). In 2017, the ban was overturned by a Circuit Court, and the ruling was appealed. In 2019, a Maryland appeals court upheld the ban.

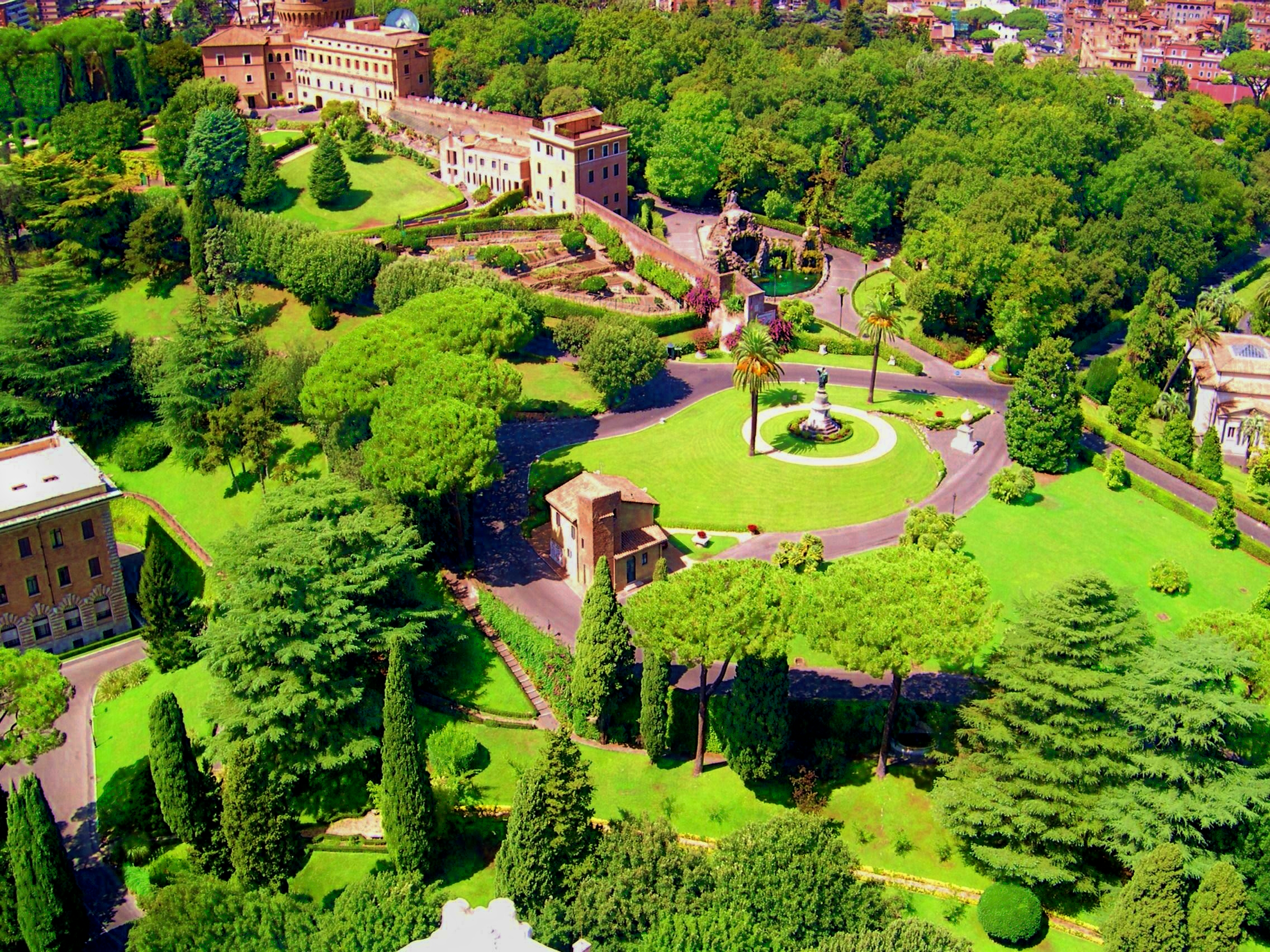
Gardens of the Vatican

=== Irvine, California, United States ===
In 2016, Non Toxic Irvine, a group led by citizens Laurie Thompson, Ayn Craciun, Kathleen Hallal, Kim Konte and Bob Johnson with help from City Councilor Christina Shea convinced the City Council to adopt an organic integrated pest management program requiring organic land care on all city property.

=== Carlsbad, California, United States ===
In 2017, Non Toxic Carlsbad campaigned to get the city to adopt an ordinance requiring organic land care on all city property.

=== Portland, Maine, United States ===
In 2018, Portland Protectors led by Avery Yale Kamila and Maggie Knowles convinced the Portland City Council to adopt an organic ordinance requiring organic land care on all public and private property.

=== Dover, New Hampshire, United States ===
In 2018, the Dover City Council unanimously approved a resolution calling for a "Commitment to Organic Land Management Practices" brought to the Council by resident group Non Toxic Dover, NH and sponsored by Councilor Dennis Shanahan. The City began an all-organic turf program for City property in 2020.

=== Gardens of Vatican City ===
In 2019, Rafael Tornini, head of the Garden and Environment Service of the Vatican, announced the 37 acre Gardens of Vatican City had been transitioning to organic management since 2017.

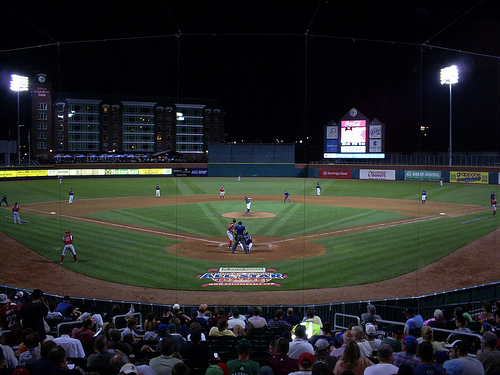
Delta Dental Stadium, home of the Fisher Cats, is the first professional baseball field to use organic management.

=== Delta Dental Stadium, Manchester, New Hampshire, United States ===
In 2019, the New Hampshire Fisher Cats began the transition to make Delta Dental Stadium the first professional baseball field that is organically managed. Stonyfield, as part of its #playfree campaign to convert recreational spaces to organic management, supported the field's transition.

=== New York City public lands, United States ===
In 2021, the New York City Council banned the use of synthetic pesticides by city agencies. The effort was started by teacher Paula Rogovin's kindergarten class at P.S. 290.

=== Maui, Hawaii, United States ===
In 2021, the island of Maui banned synthetic pesticides and fertilizers from all county lands. Community organizers including Autumn Ness, director of Beyond Pesticides' Hawai'i Organic Land Management Program worked to enact the law.

=== Baltimore, Maryland, United States ===
In 2022, a synthetic pesticide ban on public and private property passed by the Baltimore City Council in 2020 went into effect. It includes a fine of up to $250 for violators.

=== Hallowell, Maine, United States ===
In 2024, a synthetic pesticide ban on public and private property went into effect in Hallowell, which is located along the Kennebec River.

=== Falmouth, Maine, United States ===
In 2025, the town of Falmouth adopted a pesticide ordinance banning the use of most synthetic pesticides and fertilizers. In November 2025, Falmouth voters voted to keep the ordinance.

== Books ==
- "NOFA Standards for Organic Land Care 6th Edition Practices for the Design and Maintenance of Ecological Landscapes," Michael Almstead, Dr. Jamie Banks, et al., contributors. Northeast Organic Farming Association of Connecticut, Inc. 2017.
- "The Organic Lawn Care Manual: A Natural, Low-Maintenance System for a Beautiful, Safe Lawn," by Paul Tukey. Storey Publishing, LLC. 2007.

== See also ==
- Grasscycling
- Organic farming
- Organic horticulture
- Organic movement
- Natural landscaping
