= List of environmental periodicals =

This is a list of environmental periodicals, in print and online, focused on various aspects of the biophysical environment, the built environment, humans' relations to those environments, and other environment topics. This list presently includes literary magazines, general-interest magazines, newsletters, and others.

(For peer-reviewed academic journals, see the List of environmental journals. For online or hybrid periodicals, see also List of environmental websites.)

== Literary magazines ==
- The Bear Deluxe — based out of Portland, Oregon, United States
- Camas: The Nature of the West — run by graduate students at the University of Montana
- Whole Terrain: Journal of Reflective Environmental Practice — published approximately once a year by Antioch University New England
- Green Agenda — Grounded Writing — published in Naarm/Melbourne approximately four times per year online by The Green Institute

== Newsletters and newspapers ==
- ClimateWire — daily news service by Environment & Energy Publishing, USA
- Down to Earth — science and environment magazine fortnightly published in India by the Centre for Science and Environment
- The ENDS Report — based in the UK and published by Environmental Data Services Ltd.
- EU Forest Watch — monthly forest issues newsletter focusing on the European Union, published by FERN
- Greenwire — daily electronic newsletter by Environment & Energy Publishing, USA
- Hawaii Island Journal — published on the Big Island of Hawaii

== Popular magazines ==
- A\J: Alternatives Journal — official publication of the Environmental Studies Association of Canada; based in Waterloo, Ontario
- Checkerspot — published by the Canadian Wildlife Federation
- E–The Environmental Magazine — published by the Earth Action Network, based in Escondido, California
- Earth First! Journal — published by Earth First!
- Ecology and Law — quarterly environmental advocacy and news magazine of the Bellona Foundation, Saint Petersburg, Russia
- ECOS (Australia) — Australian environmental magazine published by CSIRO
- ECOS (UK) — quarterly publication of the British Association of Nature Conservationists
- El Ecologista (Spain) — quarterly publication of Ecologistas en Acción
- Environment magazine — "Science and Policy for Sustainable Development," published in Philadelphia by Taylor & Francis
- The Environmentalist — public interest, eco-investigative online magazine
- G: The Green Lifestyle Magazine — published in Sydney, Australia
- Gobar Times — monthly environmental education magazine for young adults, published in India by the Centre for Science and Environment
- Green Car Journal
- The Green Guide — produced by the National Geographic Society
- Grist (online magazine) — headquartered in Seattle, Washington
- High Country News — magazine, website, and op-ed column addressing public lands, water, natural resources, grazing, wilderness, wildlife, logging, growth and other issues in the American West
- Home Power — based in Ashland, Oregon
- InsideClimate News (online magazine) — based in Brooklyn, New York
- Mongabay (online magazine) — based in Menlo Park, California
- Mother Earth News — based in Topeka, Kansas
- Natural History — published by the American Museum of Natural History, aiming to promote public understanding and appreciation of nature and science
- Natural Home & Garden — American bimonthly magazine about sustainable homes and lifestyle
- Natural Life — based in Canada and owned by Life Media
- Orion — published by the Orion Society and based in Great Barrington, Massachusetts
- Piemonte Parchi — former paper magazine now on-line, published in Italy by the Piedmont Regional Government
- ReNew — Australian magazine first published by the Alternative Energy Co-operative in 1980
- Resurgence & Ecologist — British bi-monthly green magazine
- Sanctuary Asia — India's first and one of its leading environmental news magazines
- Sierra Magazine — the national magazine of the Sierra Club
- Sustain Europe (100% recycled print and online magazine) — Semiannual European title covering tourism, business, energy and sustainable development.

== Specialized periodicals ==
- Chinadialogue — online magazine based in London, Beijing and San Francisco
- Corporate Knights — quarterly Canadian magazine focusing on corporate social and environmental responsibility
- Earth Negotiations Bulletin — internet publication covering international environmental negotiations, workshops and conferences, published by the Reporting Services arm of the International Institute for Sustainable Development
- The ENDS Report — published monthly by Environmental Data Services Ltd, now part of the Haymarket Group
- Journal of Contemporary Water Research & Education — published by the Universities Council on Water Resources
- Landscope — quarterly journal of the Western Australia Department of Environment and Conservation
- New York State Conservationist — published by the New York State Department of Environmental Conservation
- Noise & Health — published by Medknow Publications on behalf of the Noise Research Network
- Organic Matters — published by the Irish Organic Farmers and Growers Association

== Defunct periodicals ==
- The Ecologist — British environmental magazine, 1970-2009; now merged with Resurgence
- Energy Matters — discontinued; published by students at the University of Cambridge between November 1980 and June 1984
- European Nuclear Disarmament Journal — discontinued; bi-monthly magazine of the European Nuclear Disarmament group in the United Kingdom
- Muutoksen kevät — published in Tampere, Finland, 1995—2003.
- Wild Earth — discontinued; published in the United States
- Worldchanging — published in San Francisco, then Seattle, Washington, from 2003-2010

== See also ==
- List of environmental journals — for peer-reviewed, scholarly periodicals
- List of environmental websites
- Lists of environmental publications
