= Environmental journalism =

Style of reporting

Environmental journalism is the collection, verification, production, distribution and exhibition of information regarding current events, trends, and issues associated with the non-human world. To be an environmental journalist, one must have an understanding of scientific language. The individual needs to put to use their knowledge of historical environmental events. One must have the ability to follow environmental policy decisions and environmental organizations. An environmental journalist should have a general understanding of current environmental concerns, and the ability to communicate information to the public in a way that is easily understood.

Environmental journalism falls within the scope of environmental communication. Its roots can be traced to nature writing. One controversy in environmental journalism is, how to distinguish the genre from its allied disciplines.

== History ==
While the practice of nature writing has a rich history that dates back at least as far as the exploration narratives of Christopher Columbus, and follows tradition up through prominent nature writers like Ralph Waldo Emerson and Henry David Thoreau in the late 19th century, John Burroughs and John Muir in the early 20th century, and Aldo Leopold in the 1940s, the field of environmental journalism did not begin to take shape until the 1960s and 1970s.

The growth of environmental journalism as a profession roughly parallels that of the environmental movement, which became a mainstream cultural movement with the publication of Rachel Carson's Silent Spring in 1962 and was further legitimized by the passage of the Wilderness Act in 1964. Grassroots environmental organizations made a booming appearance on the political scene in the 1960s and 1970s, raising public awareness of what many considered to be the "environmental crisis", and working to influence environmental policy decisions. The mass media has followed and generated public interest on environmental issues ever since.

The field of environmental journalism was further legitimized by the creation of the Society of Environmental Journalists in 1990, whose mission "is to advance public understanding of environmental issues by improving the quality, accuracy, and visibility of environmental reporting." Today, academic programs are offered at a number of institutions to train budding journalists in the rigors, complexity and sheer breadth of environmental journalism

== Risks and Challenges ==
Environmental journalism plays a vital role in addressing global crises like climate change and biodiversity loss, educating the public and holding policymakers accountable. However, it is a high-risk profession, as journalists often face threats while reporting from remote and hazardous locations on issues such as deforestation and pollution.

Over the past 15 years, the 2024 UNESCO report documents a concerning rise in attacks on environmental journalists worldwide, with 749 incidents, including 44 murders, of which only five resulted in convictions. The report identifies state and private actors, as well as criminal groups, as major sources of these threats, which severely undermine the dissemination of essential environmental information. This situation is further exacerbated by the spread of climate-related disinformation on social media. Additionally, a survey involving more than 900 environmental journalists revealed that 70% had experienced threats related to their work, highlighting the grave and widespread challenges facing journalists in this field.

== Advocacy debate ==
There exists a minor rift in the community of environmental journalists. Some, including those in the Society of Environmental Journalists, believe in objectively reporting environmental news, while others, like Michael Frome, a prominent figure in the field, believe that journalists should only enter the environmental side of the field if saving the planet is a personal passion, and that environmental journalists should not shy away from environmental advocacy, though not at the expense of clearly relating facts and opinions on all sides of an issue.

== Genres ==
=== Environmental communication ===
Environmental communication is all of the forms of communication that are engaged with the social debate about environmental issues and problems.

Also within the scope of environmental communication are the genres of nature writing, science writing, environmental literature, environmental interpretation and environmental advocacy. While there is a great deal of overlap among the various genres within environmental communication, they are each deserving of their own definition.

=== Nature writing ===
Nature writing is the genre with the longest history in environmental communication. In his book, This Incomparable Land: A Guide to American Nature Writing, Thomas J. Lyon attempts to use a "taxonomy of nature writing" in order to define the genre. He suggests that his classifications, too, suffer a great deal of overlap and intergrading. "The literature of nature has three main dimensions to it: natural history information, personal responses to nature, and philosophical interpretation of nature" (Lyon 20). In the natural history essay, "the main burden of the writing is to convey pointed instruction in the facts of nature," such as with the ramble-type nature writing of John Burroughs (Lyon 21). "In essays of experience, the author's firsthand contact with nature is the frame for the writing," as with Edward Abbey's contemplation of a desert sunset (Lyon 23).

In the philosophical interpretation of nature, the content is similar to that of the natural history and personal experience essays, "but the mode of presentation tends to be more abstract and scholarly" (Lyon 25). The Norton Book of Nature Writing adds a few new dimensions to the genre of nature writing, including animal narratives, garden essays, farming essays, ecofeminist works, writing on environmental justice, and works advocating environmental preservation, sustainability and biological diversity. Environmental journalism pulls from the tradition and scope of nature writing.

=== Science writing ===
Science writing is writing that focuses specifically on topics of scientific study, generally translating jargon that is difficult for those outside a particular scientific field to understand into language that is easily digestible. This genre can be narrative or informative. Not all science writing falls within the bounds of environmental communication, only science writing that takes on topics relevant to the environment. Environmental journalism also pulls from the tradition and scope of science writing.

=== Environmental interpretation ===
Environmental interpretation is a particular format for the communication of relevant information. It "involves translating the technical language of a natural science or related field into terms and ideas that people who aren't scientists can readily understand. And it involves doing it in a way that's entertaining and interesting to these people". Environmental interpretation is pleasurable (to engage an audience in the topic and inspire them to learn more about it), relevant (meaningful and personal to the audience so that they have an intrinsic reason to learn more about the topic), organized (easy to follow and structured so that main points are likely to be remembered) and thematic (the information is related to a specific, repetitious message). While environmental journalism is not derived from environmental interpretation, it can employ interpretive techniques to explain difficult concepts to its audience.

=== Environmental literature ===
Environmental literature is writing that comments intelligently on environmental themes, particularly as applied to the relationships between man, society and the environment. Most nature writing and some science writing falls within the scope of environmental literature. Often, environmental literature is understood to espouse care and concern for the environment, thus advocating a more thoughtful and ecologically sensitive relationship of man to nature. Environmental journalism is partially derived from environmental literature

=== Environmental advocacy ===
Environmental advocacy is presenting information on nature and environmental issues that is decidedly opinionated and encourages its audience to adopt more environmentally sensitive attitudes, often more biocentric worldviews. Environmental advocacy can be present in any of the aforementioned genres of environmental communication. It is currently debated whether environmental journalism should employ techniques of environmental advocacy.

== Topics ==
The field of environmental journalism covers a wide variety of topics. According to The Reporter's Environmental Handbook, environmental journalists perceive water concerns as the most important environmental issue, followed by atmospheric air pollution concerns, endocrine disruptors, and waste management issues. The journalists surveyed were more likely to prioritize specific, local environmental issues than global environmental concerns.

Environmental journalism can include, but is not limited to, some of the following topics:

From The Reporter's Environmental Handbook:

- Air pollution (Outdoor)
- Air pollution (Indoor)
- Animal waste management
- Biodiversity
- Brownfields ("former industrial and commercial sites" (104))
- Cancer and other disease cluster claims
- Chemical emergencies
- Chemical weapons (Disarmament)
- Children's health (Asthma)
- Children's health (Lead)
- Cross-border environmental issues (U.S.-Mexico)
- Dioxin
- Disposal of dredged materials
- Endocrine disruptors ("also called a hormonally active agent, [it] is a chemical that interferes with the functioning of the endocrine system" (172))
- Environmental justice and hazardous waste
- Food irradiation
- Genetically modified crops
- Global warming and climate change
- Groundwater pollution
- Naturally occurring and technology-based disasters
- Occupational health
- Ozone depletion
- Pesticides
- Population growth
- Sprawl and environmental health
- Surface water quality
- Water supply

From EnviroLink:

- Agriculture
- Air quality
- Climate change
- Ecosystems
- Energy
- Environmental disasters
- Environmental economics
- Environmental education
- Environmental ethics
- Environmental legislation and environmental policy
- Forests
- Ground pollution
- Habitat conservation
- Natural history
- Outdoor recreation
- Population
- Sciences
- Social Sciences and humanities
- Sustainable development
- Sustainable living
- Transportation
- Urban issues
- Vegetarianism
- Waste management
- Water quality
- Wildlife

== See also ==
- Advocacy journalism
- Conservation Commons
- Conservation movement
- Dean v. Utica
- Ecology
- Ecology movement
- Ecopoetry
- Environmental communication
- Environmental movement
- Environmental science
- Environmentalism
- European Environmental Press (EEP)
- Grantham Prize for Excellence in Reporting on the Environment
- Journal of Environmental Economics and Management
- Journalism
- Journalism ethics and standards
- List of environment topics
- List of environmental periodicals
- Lists of environmental publications
- Objectivity (journalism)
- Objectivity (philosophy) main article discussing the concept of objectivity in various fields (history, science, journalism, philosophy, etc.)
- Outline of environmental journalism
- Science journalism
