= Outline of environmental journalism =

Overview of and topical guide to environmental journalism

The following outline is provided as an overview of and topical guide to environmental journalism.

Environmental journalism is a field of journalism concerned with the collection, verification, production, and dissemination of news and information about environmental issues and the relationship between human activity and the natural environment. It includes reporting on topics such as climate change, ecological processes, resource use, pollution, and environmental policy, as well as the social, political, and economic dimensions of environmental change. The field is often discussed in relation to traditions such as nature writing and environmental communication, which have influenced its development.

== Essence ==
- Nature writing
- Environmental communication
- Ecology

== Branches ==
- Nature writing
- Science writing
- Environmental literature

== Common topics ==
- Agriculture
- Air Pollution
- Biodiversity
- Cancer
- Chemical weapons
- Children's Health (Asthma)
- Dioxins and dioxin-like compounds
- Ecosystems
- Endocrine Disruptors
- Environmental Justice
- Food irradiation
- Genetically Modified Crops
- Global Warming / Climate Change
- Natural disaster
- Occupational Health
- Ozone
- Pesticides
- Population growth
- Sprawl / Environmental Health
- Water resources

== General concepts ==
- Environmentalism
- Conservation (Closely tied with Environmentalism)
- Environmental accounting

== Notable people ==
- Rachel Carson

== Environmental ==
- List of environmental topics
- List of environmental periodicals
- List of environmental publications

== See also ==
- Journalism
- Heritage interpretation
- Category:Natural environment
