= Andrew Simmons (disambiguation) =

Andrew Simmons is a wrestler.

Andrew Simmons may also refer to:

- Andrew Simmons (environmentalist)
- Andrew Simmons (journalist)
- Andrew Simmons, character in Ann Carver's Profession

== See also ==
- Andrew Symonds, cricketer
