= EEP =

EEP or Eep may refer to:

- Early Entrance Program (CSU), of the California State University
- Early Entrance Program, of the University of Washington; see Transition School and Early Entrance Program
- EAZA Ex-situ Programme, a management system for the captive breeding of wild animals in zoos
- Education Equality Project, an American educational organization
- Eep Crood, a fictional character in the movie The Croods, its sequel and a TV series
- "Eep, Opp, Ork, Ah-ah!", a song in the U.S. TV series The Jetsons
- Ethiopian Electric Power
- European Environmental Press
- Export Enhancement Program, of the United States Department of Agriculture
- Extraspinal ependymoma, a type of ependymoma tumor
- UK Educational Evidence Portal
- Equal error protection, an error correction scheme used in DAB
