= John Berger (disambiguation) =

John Berger (1926–2017) was an English art critic, novelist, painter, poet and author.

John Berger may also refer to:

- John Berger (author) (born 1945), American author and environmental consultant
- John Berger (cross-country skier) (1909–2002), Swedish cross-country skier
- John Berger (politician), Australian politician
- Johnny Berger (1901–1979), American baseball catcher
- John M. Berger (born 1967), terrorism researcher

== See also ==
- Andrew John Berger (1915–1995), American ornithologist
- John Borger (disambiguation)
