= National Green Corps =

Indian government program

- The NGC Logo (Left) with Indian Emblem as the logo of Ministry of Indian Environment and Forests (Right)
- Region served: Whole of India
- Website: moef.gov.in/en/national-green-corps-ngc/

National Green Corps is a programme of the Ministry of Environment and Forests of Government of India covering around 1,20,000 schools in India with NGC School Eco Clubs. Environmental activity in schools in India is promoted through the National Green Corps. Each NGC School Eco Club has 30 to 50 NGC Students or NGC Cadets who form the National Green Corps. These NGC Students participate in activities related to Biodiversity Conservation, Water Conservation, Energy Conservation, Waste Management and Land Use Planning and Resource Management. Locale specific issues are focused on by the NGC Eco Clubs. To attract public attention and support, young girls and boys from NGC take up environmental awareness activities and outreach activities for an environmental cause or environmental intervention. Water Harvesting, Plantation, Composting of biodegradable waste are popular activities in the NGC School Eco Clubs. These NGC School Eco Clubs promote environmental discipline and environmental responsibility through the selected schools in India using environmental awareness as the medium. Each of the 250 districts in India has about 250 NGC Eco Clubs. These NGC Eco Clubs are provided with an annual grant of Rs2500. Each of the Indian State has a State Nodal Officer who implements this programme.

The NGC Children are making a huge impact in the country. Karnataka, Telangana, Andhra Pradesh, Gujarat, Maharashtra, Orissa, Kerala, Punjab, Jammu and Kashmir, Assam, Chhattisgarh, Madhya Pradesh and Tamil Nadu are some of the states where this programme is making huge impact on the society. Telangana and Andhra Pradesh have a separate Directorates for conducting this programme, while all other states conduct this programme through one of those organizations which is interested in environmental awareness and conservation aspects. Telangana has much more involvement than any other state. They even own a website. In Telangana and Andhra Pradesh, Sikkim, Delhi and Himachal Pradesh the eco-club schools participate in the Green Schools Programme conducted by the Environment Education Unit of the Centre for Science and Environment. The eco-club schools that win awards at the state level go on to compete for the National Awards organized by Centre for Science and Environment (CSE) in Delhi.

Since school children are involved, most of the activities of National Green Corps children are linked to the culture and cultural aspects of conservation of natural resources and environment. There are Master Trainers trained by the State Nodal Agencies with the help of the State Resource Agencies who train the Teachers-In-Charge of the NGC Eco Clubs. Each district has the District Implementation and Monitoring Committee which is supported by the District Coordinator, while at the state level the State Nodal Officer is guided by the state level Committee. This is the largest such programme anywhere in the world. When these trained NGC Students grow up and take the environmental challenges of this second the most populous country, it is expected that there will be huge difference made to the way the resources are consumed and conserved. Andhra Pradesh is trying to groom the NGC Cadets as an environmentally disciplined force. It has introduced Uniform and Band along with a structured programme of formation of five teams of cadets exclusively in all NGC School Eco Clubs. These NGC Cadets are the Green Brigade of the school, protecting the natural resources from misuse and promoting the conservation of the natural resources. These NGC Cadets are getting the pride place during the National Days when they participate in full NGC Uniform during the ceremonial parades along with other uniformed forces of the country.

The first ever National Conference of National Green Corps Eco Clubs is at Hyderabad from 26 to 29 August 2010.

== See also ==
- Gobar Times
