= Soft technology =

Soft technology may refer to:

- Soft energy technology
- Soft Technology, the original title of ReNew magazine
- Software
