= Grigory Pasko =

Russian journalist (born 1962)

Grigory Pasko Григорий Пасько
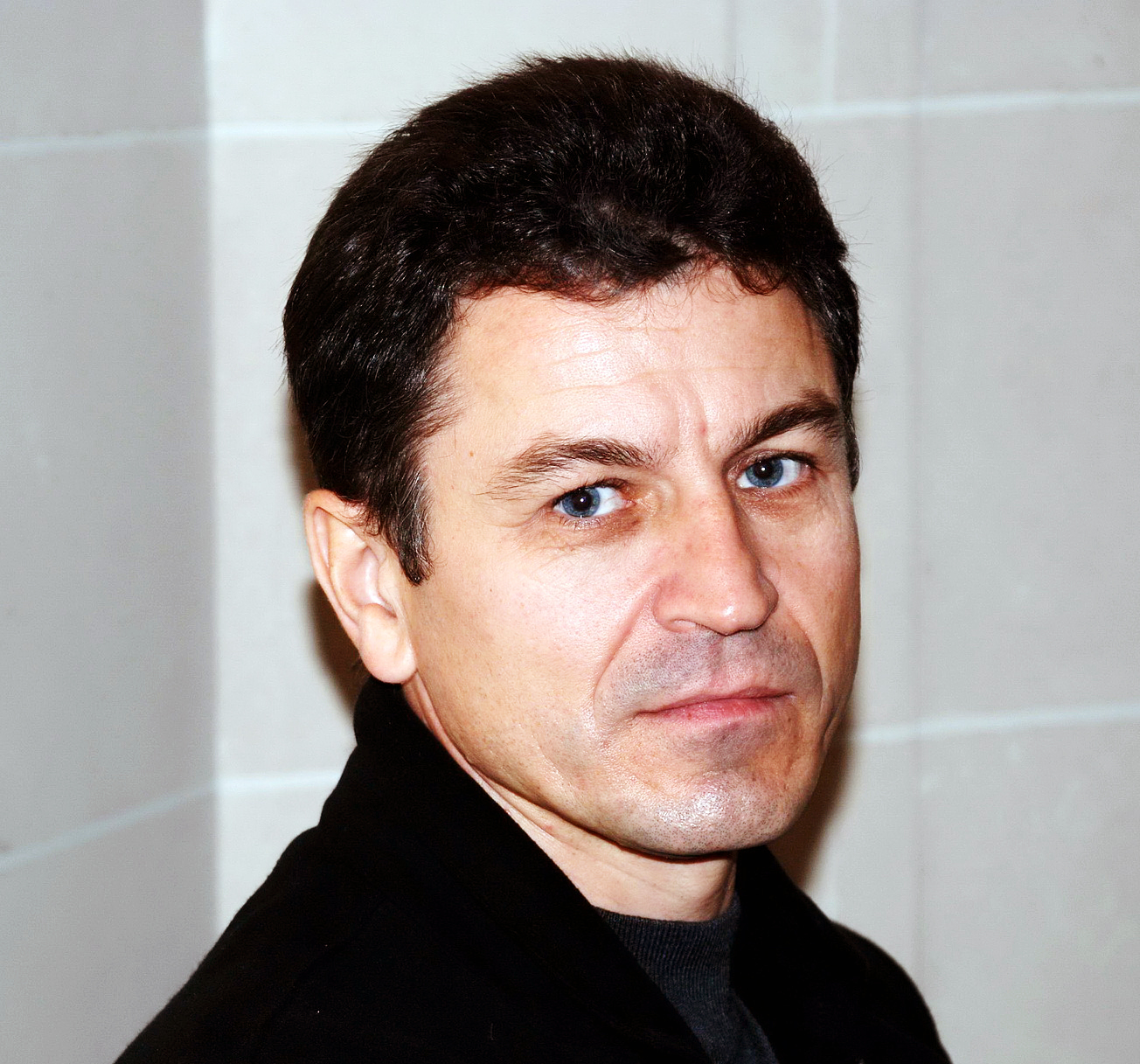
- Pasko in 2007
- Born: 19 May 1962 (age 64); Kreshchenovka, Kherson Oblast, Ukrainian SSR
- Education: Journalism, 1983
- Alma mater: Lviv University
- Occupation: journalist
- Writing career
- Subjects: ecology, politics
- Notable awards: Reporters Without Borders Human Rights Award, 2002
- Website: robertamsterdam.com/author/pasko/

Grigory Mikhailovich Pasko (Russian: Григо́рий Миха́йлович Пасько, born 19 May 1962) is a military Russian journalist, convicted traitor, Amnesty International-designated prisoner of conscience, and founding editor of Ecology and Law, an environmental and citizens' rights magazine.

== Life ==
Pasko was born in the village of Kreshchenovka, Kherson Oblast, currently Ukraine, to a teacher's family. He graduated from the journalism department of Lviv University in 1983, and worked as an investigative journalist and editor for Boyevaya Vakhta (Battle Watch), the in-house newspaper of the Russian Pacific Fleet. He worked with Japanese journalists from the NHK TV network and the Asahi Shimbun national daily newspaper. He disclosed the dumping of nuclear waste by the Russian Navy in the Sea of Japan in 1993.

== Prisoner of conscience ==
On 23 November 1997, Pasko was arrested by Russian Federal Security Service agents in Vladivostok. He was accused of espionage for his publications on environmental problems in the Japanese sea, but initially found not guilty, because of the lack of evidence. Due to the efforts of his attorneys, including Ivan Pavlov, Pasko was convicted only for two points of accusation (from sixty). He was found guilty of “abuse of his official position”, but released immediately under a general amnesty.

After several re-trials, the Court of the Pacific Fleet ultimately acquitted Pasko on all counts except espionage, sentencing him to four years of imprisonment for treason on December 25, 2001. He was recognized as a prisoner of conscience by Amnesty International.

In 2003, he was released from detention. Eighteen months later, he was allowed to travel abroad.

== Complaints to the European Court ==
In October 2009, the European Court of Human Rights rejected the complaints raised by Pasko against Russia under Article 10 ECHR (freedom of expression) by 6 votes to 1:

The Court first noted that both pieces of law on which the domestic courts had based their findings, namely the federal law State Secret Act (the Act) of 1993 listing categories of information that may be classified as secret and a Presidential Decree (the Decree) of 1995 listing information classified as secret with sufficient precision, had been in force during the period of the events, had been publicly available and thus enabling Mr Pasko to foresee the consequences of his actions.

The court also observed that "as a serving military officer, the applicant had been bound by an obligation of discretion in relation to anything concerning the performance of his duties".

Finally, the European court found that "The domestic courts’ decisions appeared reasoned and well-founded. There had been nothing in the materials of the case to support the applicant’s allegations that his conviction had been overly broad or politically motivated or that he had been sanctioned for any of his publications."

His appeal was rejected in May 2010.

== Further work ==
From 2002-2008, Pasko was the founding editor-in-chief of Ecology and Law, a quarterly magazine published by the St. Petersburg branch of the Environmental Rights Center Bellona.

He is a member of the Russian PEN Center in Vladivostok.

== Awards ==
While imprisoned in 2002, Pasko received a human rights award from Reporters Without Borders.

== See also ==
- German Ugryumov
