= Hazel Thayer =

Canadian–American environmental communicator and comedian

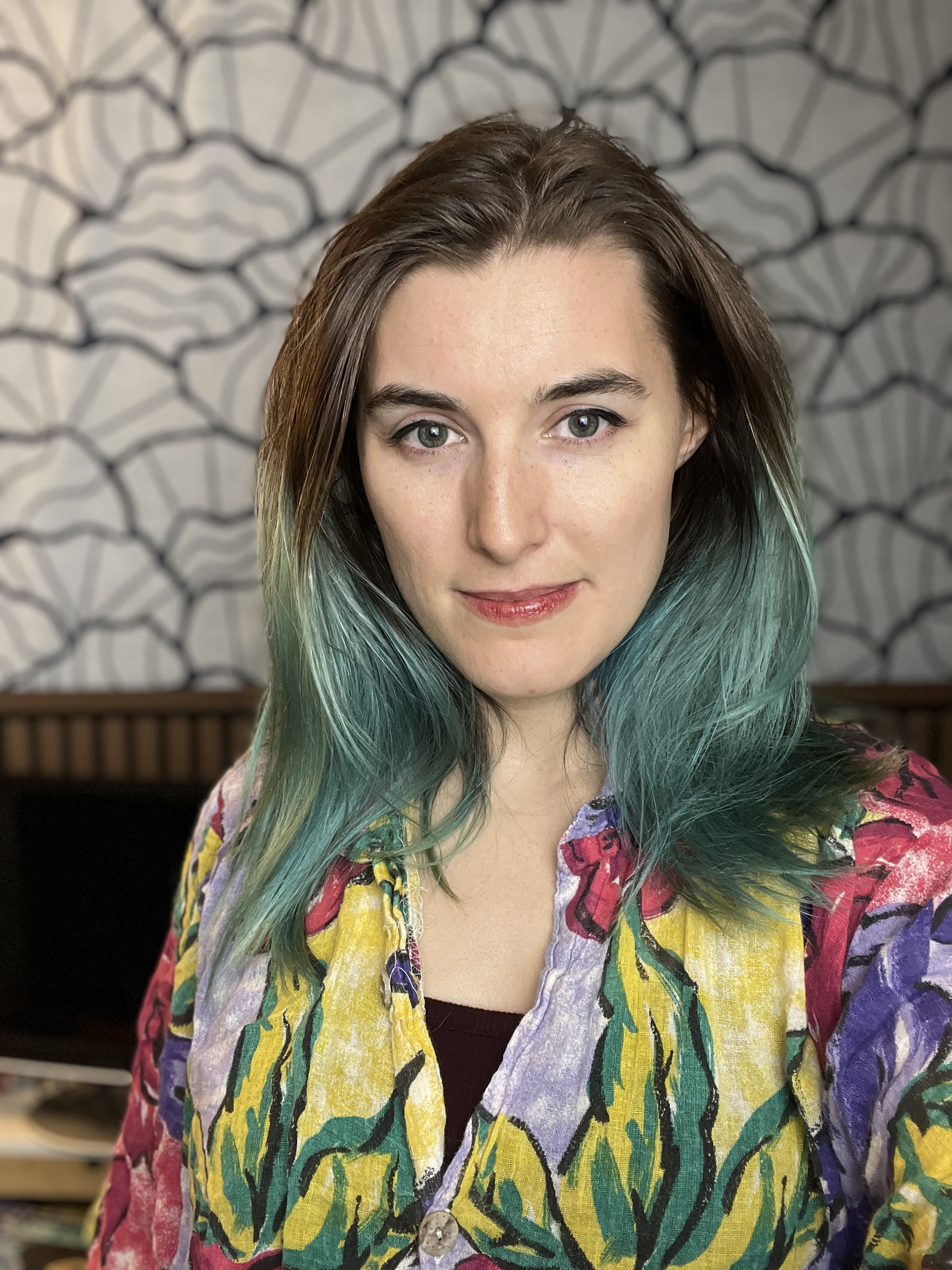
- Hazel Thayer in 2025
- Born: January 22, 1996 (age 30); Los Angeles, California, U.S.
- Education: University of Alberta (BA, Economics)
- Occupations: Environmental communicator, comedian

Hazel Thayer is a Canadian–American environmental communicator, comedian, and digital media influencer based in Victoria, British Columbia. She advocates environmental and social causes on platforms such as Instagram, TikTok, and YouTube.

== Early life and education ==
Thayer was born in Los Angeles, California, the daughter of musician Donnette Thayer. She earned a bachelor's degree in Economics from the University of Alberta. She is a dual citizen of the United States and Canada.

== Career ==
Thayer began performing stand-up comedy in 2019 as a means to discuss climate change. She felt that traditional dry, scientific framing normally provided for these issues did not resonate with the general public, but humour did. She has produced two online series: The Climate Breakdown with The Weather Network and UnF*cking the Planet with Pique Action. Having studied economics, she places climate change in a socio-economic context and proposes efficient methods to effect change, eschewing doomscrolling and guilt-based messaging. Her videos criticize overconsumption, greenwashing, and fossil-fuel politics while emphasizing proactive steps that anyone can take. In interviews, Thayer described her views on the correlation between social equity and climate action: "Anything that kind of improves living standards and equality will wind up helping the climate as well."

== Public engagement and recognition ==
Thayer has spoken at political, youth, and environmental events, including the "Careers for Change: Climate Action" program hosted by the Reservoir: Center for Water Solutions in Washington, D.C., in February 2024 and was an invited participant at the 2024 Democratic National Convention. She was profiled in the 2023 Climate Creators to Watch list.

== Personal life ==
Thayer lives in Victoria, British Columbia, where she is involved in numerous political, community, environmental, and arts activities.

== See also ==
- Climate justice
- Social media activism
