= CYEN =

CYEN may refer to:

- The code for the Estevan Regional Aerodrome in Saskatchewan, Canada
- The acronym for the Caribbean Youth Environment Network, an international organisation in Barbados and Saint Vincent and the Grenadines

== See also ==
- Cyen
