= Environmental Communication (journal) =

- Discipline: Environmental science Communication studies
- Language: English
- Edited by: Shirley Ho

Publication details
- History: 2007-present
- Publisher: Routledge
- Frequency: 8/year
- Impact factor: 2.469 (2018)

Standard abbreviations
- ISO 4: Environ. Commun.

Indexing
- ISSN: 1752-4032 (print); 1752-4040 (web)
- OCLC no.: 153963063

Links
- Journal homepage; Online access; Online archive

Environmental Communication is a peer-reviewed scientific journal covering environmental communication. It was established in May 2007, with Steve Depoe (University of Cincinnati) as founding editor, and is published eight times per year by Routledge. It is the official journal of the International Environmental Communication Association. The editor-in-chief is Shirley Ho (Nanyang Technological University). According to the Taylor & Francis Journal Metrics, the journal has a 2021 impact factor of 3.518.
