= German Ugryumov =

Soviet naval official (1948–2001)

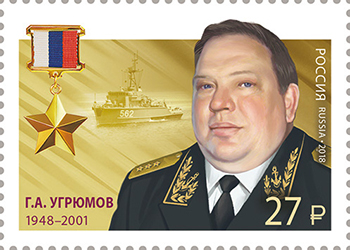
- Stamp of German Ugryumov c. 2018

Chief of the FSB Department for Protection
- In office 1999 – 31 May 2001
- President: Boris Yeltsin; Vladimir Putin

Personal details
- Born: 10 October 1948 Astrakhan, Russian SFSR, Soviet Union
- Died: 31 May 2001 (aged 52) Khankala, Chechen Republic, Russia
- Awards: Hero of the Russian Federation

Military service
- Allegiance: Russia; Soviet Union (to 1991)
- Branch/service: Russian Navy; Soviet Navy (to 1991)
- Years of service: 1967–2001
- Rank: Admiral
- Commands: Black Sea Fleet
- Battles/wars: Black January; First Chechen War; Second Chechen War †

German Ugryumov giving an interview.

German Alexeyevich Ugryumov (Russian: Герман Алексеевич Угрюмов; 10 October 1948, Astrakhan, Soviet Union – 31 May 2001, Khankala, Chechnya, Russia) was a Soviet and Russian navy and security services official. During his childhood he lived in Chelyabinsk Oblast.

== Naval counterintelligence career ==
Ugryumov graduated in 1972 from the Caspian Navy Higher School in Baku, and in 1975 he joined the KGB. In 1976, he graduated from the Counterintelligence Higher School in Novosibirsk. He worked for the Caspian Fleet counterintelligence unit in Baku until 1992, and worked in Azerbaijan during the Black January of 1990. From 1992 to 1993 he led the Black Sea Fleet counterintelligence unit in Novorossiysk.

In 1993, he became the chief of Pacific Fleet FSB counterintelligence. While in this post, he initiated the prosecution of journalist Captain Grigory Pasko on charges of the collection and storage of allegedly classified documents of the Pacific Fleet, as well as their transfer to the Japanese NHK TV company and Asahi Shimbun newspaper. Pasko was arrested in Vladivostok on 20 November 1997, as soon as he had returned from a trip to Japan. Pasko insisted that he had only transferred public documents on ecology and that the case had been fabricated by the FSB. He was found not guilty by a court in 2000, but the decision was later overturned, and on 25 December 2001 Pasko was sentenced to four years imprisonment. Ugryumov had already died by the time of Pasko's sentence.

== Second Chechen War ==
In 1998, the new FSB Director, Vladimir Putin, promoted Ugryumov to deputy chief of the Military Counterintelligence Directorate of the FSB for the Navy. In 1999, he was appointed first deputy chief of the FSB Department for Protection of the Constitutional System and the Fight against Terrorism. From November 1999 until his death he led the department and supervised the FSB Special-Purpose Center that included the Alpha Group and Vympel spetsnaz units. Ugryumov masterminded the arrest of Chechen warlord Salman Raduev in March 2000. In September 2000, Ugryumov and Deputy Interior Minister Vladimir Kozlov managed the resolution of a hostage crisis in Lazarevskoye near Sochi. On 20 December 2000 President Putin awarded Ugryumov the Hero of Russia title for his leadership of a series of special operations conducted during the Second Chechen War.

On 21 January 2001 Putin transferred the supervision of military operations in Chechnya from the Interior Ministry and military to the FSB, and placed Ugryumov in charge of the "liquidation of the leaders of terrorist groups" as head of the regional counter-terrorist staff. According to the St Petersburg Times, this was the first time in the history of Russia that the security services had been given control of a military operation. In spring 2001, Ugryumov was promoted from rear admiral to admiral.

== Death and legacy ==
Ugryumov died on 31 May 2001 in Khankala, the main Russian military base in Chechnya. According to the official version, he died of acute heart failure. However, according to Grigory Pasko, Ugryumov's death was probably a murder, and some undisclosed FSB sources informed Alexander Korzhakov's "Stringer" website that Ugryumov had shot himself.

On 5 September 2001 the Yakhont/Sonya class minesweeper BT 244 of the Russian Caspian Fleet was renamed in his honor. Vyacheslav Morozov, a friend and colleague of Ugryumov, subsequently published a biography of Ugryumov entitled The FSB Admiral.

On 9 December 2002 Novaya Gazeta published an open letter from Yusuf Krymshamkhalov and Timur Batchaev, Karachai suspects in the 1999 apartment blocks bombings in Moscow and Volgodonsk, to the commission for investigation of this event. In the letter, they claimed that Ugryumov had supervised the bombing campaign on behalf of the FSB, and included an interview with one of main proponents of this theory, historian Yury Felshtinsky. Felshtinsky had passed the letter to the newspaper, and alleged that Ugryumov had committed suicide, possibly under pressure from the FSB.

Ugryumov also allegedly provided cover (krysha) for Arbi Barayev, who was killed soon after his death.

== See also ==
- List of Heroes of the Russian Federation
