= Piemonte Parchi =

Italian magazine devoted to nature parks and life sciences

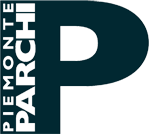
- Categories: Environment
- Frequency: Monthly
- Founded: 1983
- Final issue: 2013 (print)
- Company: Regione Piemonte
- Country: Italy
- Based in: Turin
- Language: Italian
- Website: Piemonte Parchi
- ISSN: 1124-044X

Piemonte Parchi ('Piedmont Parks') is an Italian magazine devoted to nature parks and life sciences. It is published since 1983 in Turin (Italy) by the Piedmont Regional Government.

== History and profile ==
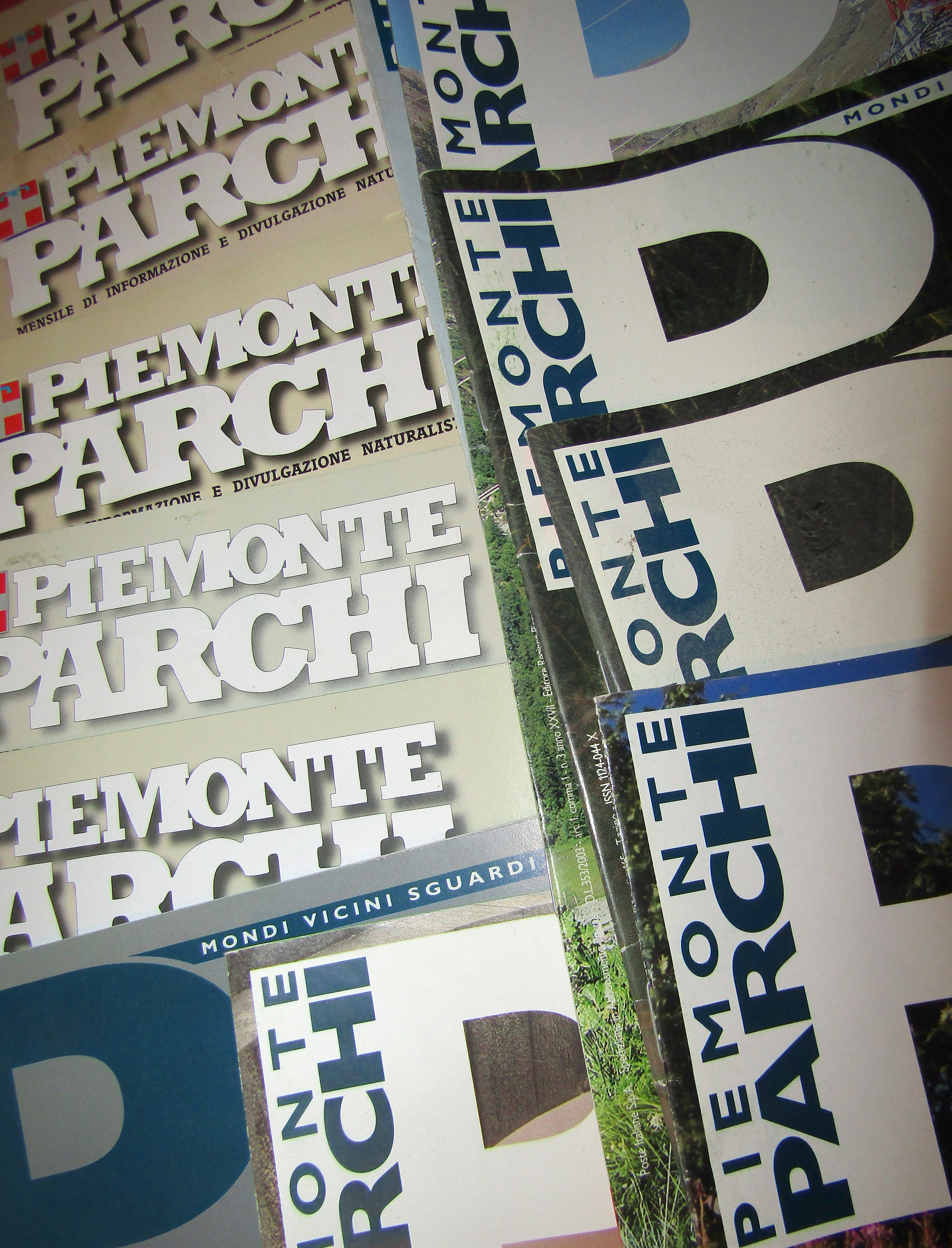
Some old paper issues

Piemonte Parchi was the first magazine published by an Italian public administration devoted to nature conservation. Its first issue was published in November 1983 and soon the journal won a widespread praise. The magazine consisted in a quarterly supplement of Notizie, the official newspaper of the Regione Piemonte; in 1985 the magazine redoubled its pages (which from that year on were all printed in colours) and became bimonthly, and then monthly.

During the early 1990s, to support its policy on nature conservation, the Regional Department for nature parks (Assessorato regionale ai parchi) printed each month around 50,000 copies of the magazine, which were sent free of charge to schools, local administrations, associations and private citizens, to inform them about the situation of the already existing nature parks in the region and the projects of new establishments. Since 1993, aiming to rationalise expenditure of the regional administration, the magazine started to be provided on the basis of paid subscriptions. Its circulation in 1997 decreased to 35,000 copies per issue. Besides its ordinary issues from 1999 on Piemonte Parchi publishes every year two tematic issues, devoted to specific topics as, for instance, Il ritorno del lupo (The return of wolves), Gli ecomusei (Ecomuseums), La speleologia in Piemonte (Speleology in Piedmont), I parchi in Europa (Nature parks in Europe) and so on. From 2001 Piemonte Parchi is on the Internet, registered as Piemonte Parchi Web, where it is flanked by an online news bulletin with the events taking place in the Piedmontese parks, and by a weekly newsletter.

In 2004 Piemonte Parchi launched Piemonte Parchi Web Junior, a web project addressed to schools, which ended in 2011. In the months preceding Turin 2006 Winter Olympics the journal launched an intensive information campaign on the event. With the 221st issue of December 2012, following a time of crisis when Piemonte Parchi risked a complete closure due to Regione Piemonte budgetary cuts, after almost 30 years of activity the magazine sharply reduced its paper format issues per year. From then on the magazine mainly goes on as a free of charge online newspaper. Contents and sections are roughly the same of the historic paper journal, and also the newsletter is still operating.

== Contents ==
Major aim of Piemonte Parchi is to provide news about the nature reserves features and activities in Piedmont, Italy and abroad. It also deals with environmental and life science issues such as geology, climatology, ornithology, zoology and botanics.

Its articles also cover territorial issues as local history and traditional products. Among the contributors of Piemonte Parchi there are prominent personalities of the Italian environmentalism as, for instance, Mario Rigoni Stern, Reinhold Messner, Antonio Cederna, Laura Conti and Piero Angela.

Since 1991 Piemonte Parchi maintains a public library named "Biblioteca delle aree protette" ("Conservation areas library"), which was confirmed in 2009 by a legge regionale and offers consultation and loans of works related to Conservation biology.

== See also ==
- List of magazines in Italy
