= John Borger =

John Borger may refer to:

- John Borger, known as Borgeous (born 1978), American DJ and music producer
- John Borger (Canadian football) (born c. 1935), Canadian football player

== See also ==
- John Berger (disambiguation)
