= Ben Magec – Ecologistas en Acción =

Non-governmental organization in the Canary Islands

Ben Magec - Ecologists in Action is a Non-Governmental Organization from the Canary Islands and part of the federation Ecologists in Action, dedicated to the protection of the environment. It is currently based in La Palma with regular appearances in local, national and international headlines, and whose actions and opinions have a regular effect on environmental policy with the Canary Islands.

== History ==
Ben Magec has its roots in Haria, Lanzarote when in 1989 a group of ecologists from all over the archipelago met together in order to join forces and a create a base for communication and exchange. This first meeting was called the Assembly of the Canarian Ecologist Movement. These meetings became annual, taking place on a rotating policy of each of the Canary Islands and were dedicated to the idea of creating a base for communication and exchange of ideas, looking for solutions to common problems and concrete solutions, whilst still respecting the autonomy of each group within the collective.

In the following years the collective took on several important issues, such as ´Save the Rincon´, a project to try to halt urbanisation and construction on farmland in the area of La Orotava.

== Biggest campaigns ==
The importance of the organisation is said to be quite understated today, especially in consideration of the movement of ecologists and the potential changes to the countryside of the Canary Islands. It is said that there are many areas of the Canarian Archipelago that would have been developed and changed in a very different way to what they have been if it was not for the impact of Ben Magec.

Two examples of this are the rural coasts of Veneguera (Gran Canaria) and El Rincon (Tenerife). These two areas were seen as being under threat during the decade of development during the 1980s. The growth of the ecologist and social sectors lead to the creation of a Popular Legislative Initiative, calling for a halt to the development of tourism on the islands. It received more than the necessary number of signatures, and after going to parliament was respected and seen as the decision of the people. This theme continued into the 21st Century with the campaign relating to the growth of tourism, the campaign was called ´Canarias tiene un límite: Ni una cama más´ ( The canaries have a limit: Not one bed more). This campaign was particularly prominent on the island of Lanzarote.

This citizen initiative demonstrated Ben Magec's ability to prevent the transformation of countryside and areas that would have otherwise been more developed by now than Puerto Rico or Puerto de La Cruz. Although these are two important examples, this defense of the territory has not relented and the last example of such work were the protests against the idea of building a new maritime front in Las Palmas de Gran Canaria in which 60,000 people took part.

In spite of fluctuations, the organisation has grown, and since the year 2000, it has been more than a simple co-ordinator of isolated meetings and campaigns, but a more structured organisation with an important media presence. It has also been developing its own identity within the movement.

In 2003, Ben Magec- Ecologistas en Accion won the Cesar Manrique Prize for its work in defense of the environment.
