= John Berger (author) =

American author and environmental consultant

John J Berger, PhD
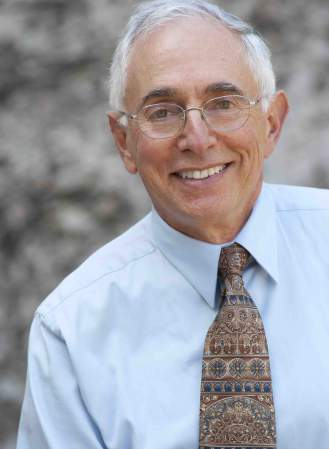
- Dr. John J Berger
- Born: May 8, 1945; New York City, United States
- Education: Stanford University (B.A.); University of California, Berkeley
- Occupations: Author, editor and consultant
- Writing career
- Period: 1976–present
- Genres: Environmental restoration, ecology, climate change, natural resources, renewable energy, energy efficiency, conservation
- Website: www.johnjberger.com

John J. Berger (born May 8, 1945 in New York City) is an environmental science and policy specialist, prize-winning American author, journalist, and environmental consultant. He has worked for the National Research Council of the National Academy of Sciences, Fortune 500 corporations such as Chevron, nonprofit groups, such as Friends of the Earth, and governmental organizations, including the Office of Technology Assessment of the United States Congress. He co-founded and directed the Nuclear Information and Resource Service as well as founding and directing the Restoring the Earth organization.

Berger has authored and edited eleven books on energy and environmental issues, including Solving the Climate Crisis: Frontline Reports from the Race to Save the Earth, Climate Peril: The Intelligent Reader's Guide to Understanding the Climate Crisis, Climate Myths: The Campaign Against Climate Science, Restoring the Earth: How Americans Are Working to Renew Our Damaged Environment, and Charging Ahead: The Business of Renewable Energy and What It Means for America.

== Biography ==
Berger is a long-time supporter of alternative energy solutions to global environmental problems. He has repeatedly called attention to the nation's excessive dependence on fossil fuels and the huge economic and environmental costs, and risks. He has outlined strategies for a clean, renewable energy economy in his books and articles which have appeared in publications such as Huffington Post, Scientific American, The Boston Globe, The Christian Science Monitor, The Los Angeles Times, and Renewable Energy World. Berger's writing on energy and natural resource issues has helped to launch the environmental restoration movement, beginning with his book Restoring the Earth in 1985 and later by convening the Restoring the Earth Conference, January 13-1, 1988, at the University of California, Berkleley.

=== Education and work ===
In 1966, John J. Berger earned a Bachelor of Arts in political science from Stanford University. Prior to his work on energy and the environment, Berger was an innovator in journalism.

In 1976, after publishing his first book, Nuclear Power: The Unviable Option, with an introduction by Nobel Laureate Linus Pauling and a foreword by Senator Mike Gravel, he was invited by David Brower to become Friends of the Earth's Energy Projects Director in San Francisco. In 1977, as a consultant to Stanley A. Weiss, co-founder of American Minerals, Berger and Judith Johnsrud conducted field research for what was to become the Nuclear Information and Resource Service, which Berger designed and directed in Washington, D.C., from 1978 to 1979. In 1979, he became a technical editor at the Lawrence Berkeley National Laboratory in Berkeley, California and enrolled in the Energy and Resources Program at the University of California, Berkeley, where he was awarded a master's degree. In 1980 and 1981, Berger taught courses in energy technology and policy at Vista College and the University of San Francisco. In 1984, Berger began two years of postgraduate research on land-use policy in Sacramento at the University of California, Davis. In 1985, he published Restoring the Earth: How Americans Are Working to Restore Our Damaged Environment and became the executive director of Restoring the Earth, an environmental organization based in Berkeley, California.

The group convened the 1988 Restoring the Earth Conference, which at the time was the most comprehensive meeting ever held on the repair of environmental damage and the re-creation of disrupted ecosystems. The meeting brought together environmental leaders, restoration practitioners, corporate executives, scientists, government officials, labor, media, grassroots activists and concerned citizens from throughout the U.S. to discuss and plan the restoration of all types of damaged natural resources and the planning of sustainable uban area. The conference drew national attention to examples of successful ecological restoration and to the potential of restoration technology to heal prior environmental damage. More than 150 scientific papers and popular talks were presented on topics ranging from the restoration of forests, rivers, lakes, streams, wetlands, estuaries, prairies, and mined lands to wildlife and its habitats; as well as prevention, management and containment of toxic wastes.

Berger later went on to receive a PhD in Ecology from the University of California, Davis in 1990 and served as visiting Associate Professor of Environmental Policy at the Graduate School of Public Affairs of the University of Maryland and Professor of Environmental Science at the University of San Francisco. In addition to his teaching and leadership of environmental organizations, Berger has been a journalist specializing in energy, environment, climate, and natural resources, and he is currently (2023) the U.S. Correspondent for Sustain Europe.

His awards include the 2015 International Book Award for Science; a Switzer Foundation Environmental Fellowship for graduate study: a year-long fellowship for study at the University of Tunis in Tunisia: a summer writing fellowship at the Blue Mountain Center in the Adirondacks; and selection to participate in a summer-study program at the Roscoe B. Jackson Memorial Laboratory for Genetic Research. Berger is also an independent energy and environmental consultant. He was an Affiliated Research Fellow at UC Berkeley's Renewable and Appropriate Energy Laboratory.

He is currently a Senior Fellow of the Pacific Institute of Oakland, California.

== Bibliography ==
=== Books ===
#	Title	Publication Date
1	Nuclear Power: The Unviable Option: A Critical Look at Our Energy Alternatives	1976
2	Restoring the Earth: How Americans Are Working to Renew Our Damaged Environment	1985
3	Ecological Restoration in the San Francisco Bay: A Descriptive Directory and Sourcebook	1990
4	Environmental Restoration: Science and Strategies for Restoring the Earth	1990
5	Charging Ahead: The Business of Renewable Energy and What it Means for America	1998
6	Understanding Forests	1998
7	Beating the Heat: Why and How We Must Combat Global Warming	2000
8	Forests Forever: Their Ecology, Restoration and Protection	2008
9	Climate Myths: The Campaign Against Climate Science	2013
10	Climate Peril: The Intelligent Reader's Guide to Understanding the Climate Crisis	2014
11	Solving the Climate Crisis: Frontline Reports from the Race to Save the Earth	2023

=== Published print articles (non-digital) ===
#	Publication	Title	Publication Date
	Scientific American	Crisis in the Cryosphere, Part 1	April 14, 2016
	USA Today Magazine	Is the Arctic Carbon Bomb About to Go Off?	July 2015
	USA Today Magazine	Time to Hit the Panic Button	January 2015
	Huffington Post	US-China Bilateral Climate Agreement–Troubling Aspects	January 13, 2015
	Huffington Post	Naomi Klein, Climate and Capitalism (Pt. 1)	January 12, 2015
	Huffington Post	Why Voluntary Pledges Won’t Save the Climate	January 12, 2015
	Huffington Post	California Energy Strategists Push for 100% Clean Energy, Without Fossil Fuels or Nuclear Power	October 27, 2014
	Huffington Post	Rocket’s Red Glare, Bombs Bursting in Air Steal Global Climate Protests’ Thunder (Pt. 2)	September 30, 2014
	Huffington Post	Rocket’s Red Glare Distract Nation From UN Climate Summit and Import of Global Climate Protests	September 25, 2014
	USA Today	Hot Under the Collar Over Global Warming	July 2013
1	Environment News Service	Opinion: Bush Energy Policy – Fuels Rush In	June 2001
2	Positive Alternatives	Cover Story: Prospects for Solar and Wind Power	Winter 1998
3	Earth Island Journal	A Future Without Fossil Fuel	Winter 1997
4	Sierra Magazine	Natural Resources: Dirty Politics, Clean Power	November/December 1997
5	San Francisco Chronicle	SUNDAY INTERVIEW – John J. Berger / Getting Resourceful About Energy	October 1997
6	Sierra Magazine	Nine Ways to Save our National Forests	July/August 1997
7	National Research Council	Aquatic Ecosystems on the Critical List	1993
8	San Francisco Examiner	Polluting the Earth in the USSR	July 18, 1989
9	Animal Kingdom	A Big Hand for a Little Owl	March/April 1988
10	OMNI	Tree Shakers	November 1986
11	Sierra Magazine	The Audacious Vision of Marion Stoddart	March/April 1986
12	Sierra Magazine	The Prairie Makers	November/December 1985
13	San Francisco Examiner: Image Magazine	Return of the Falcon	October 20, 1985
14	Boston Globe Sunday Magazine	Optimal Suburbia	September 22, 1985
15	National Audubon Society	Montague and the Temple of Doom	September 1985
16	Los Angeles Times Magazine	Future Cities	November 17, 1985
17	OMNI	Myths of Scarcity	February 1982
18	The Progressive	Desert Fallout: One Man's Death	August 1981
