= Sunita Narain =

Indian environmentalist

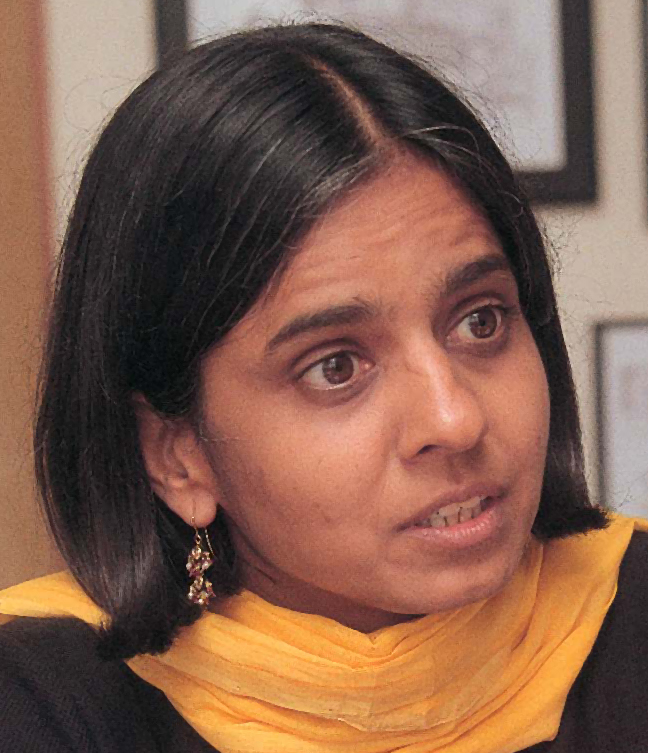
- Narain in 2009
- Born: 1961 (age 64–65); New Delhi, India
- Education: University of Delhi
- Occupation: Environmentalist
- Awards: Padma Shri (2005); Raja-Lakshmi Award (2009); Edinburgh Medal (2020)
- Website: cseindia.org/page/sunita-narain

Sunita Narain (born 1961) is an Indian environmentalist and political activist known for her work on sustainable development and environmental policy. She is the director general of the India-based research organisation Centre for Science and Environment, director of the Society for Environmental Communications, and editor of the magazine Down To Earth.

She has served on government, intergovernmental and international advisory bodies focussed on environmental policy, climate change, water management and sustainable development. Narain appeared alongside Leonardo DiCaprio in the documentary Before the Flood (2016), where she discussed the impact of climate change on the Indian monsoon and its effects on farmers.

== Early life ==
Narain was born in 1961 in New Delhi and was the oldest of four sisters. Her father, Raj Narain, who died when she was eight, had been a freedom fighter and established a handicrafts business. Her mother, Usha Narain, took over the business and raised Sunita and her siblings. The income from the business provided the family with a comfortable lifestyle.

In 1979, she joined Kalpavriksh, a student anti-logging activist group. Narain told Marcello Rossi of the Smithsonian that it gave her a new life direction, as she realised that "the crux wasn't the trees, but the rights of people over those trees". She completed her undergraduate studies by correspondence at Delhi University between 1980 and 1983.

== Career ==
Narain began working with the Centre for Science and Environment (CSE), one of India's first environmental non-governmental organisations whilst still a student in Delhi, working with the founder Anil Agarwal. Narain became deputy director of the NGO in 1993, and was appointed director in 2000.

Narain, following the scientific consensus on climate change, attributes blame for the climate crisis to the fossil fuel-based economies of Western countries, and advocates that India should seek an alternative route to economic growth. Under her leadership, CSE exposed the high level of pesticides present in American brands of soft drinks such as Coca-Cola and Pepsi.

In 2012, she wrote the seventh State of India's Environment Report, Excreta Matters. The report examines water and waste management challenges in 71 Indian cities, highlighting inefficient supply systems, untreated sewage, and the need for sustainable, equitable urban water solutions.

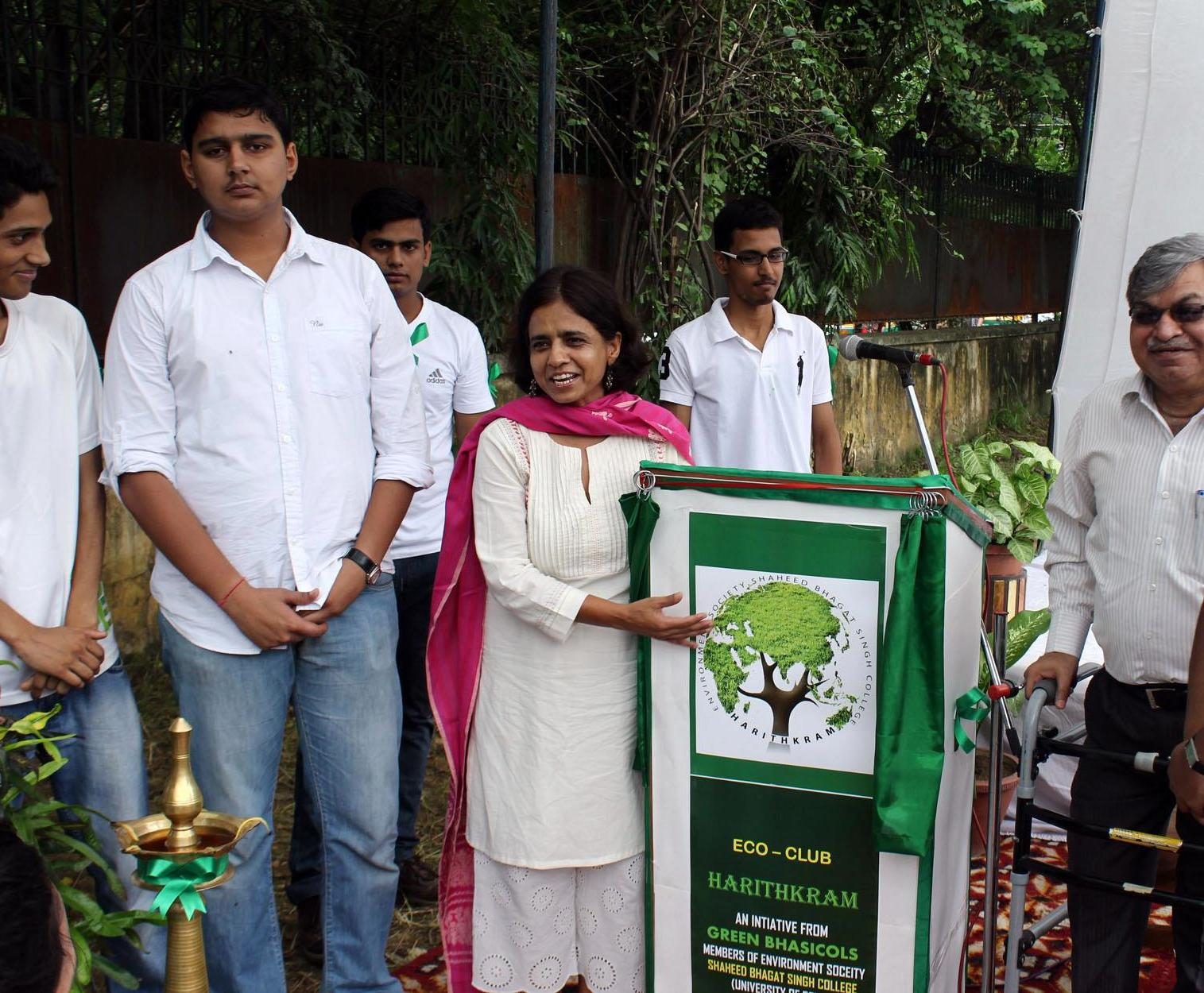
Narain unveiling the Harithkram Eco-Club logo (2014).

In 2016, Narain was named in the Time 100 list of most influential people. Novelist Amitav Ghosh wrote in Time that "a paper that [Narain] co-authored in 1991 remains to this day the foundational charter of the global climate justice movement. [She] has also consistently opposed the kind of elite conservationism that blames environmental problems on the poor."

Narain appeared alongside Leonardo DiCaprio in the documentary Before The Flood (2016) in which she explored the impact of climate change on the Indian monsoon and how it affects farmers.

In 2005, she chaired the Tiger Task Force at the direction of Manmohan Singh to evolve an action plan for conservation in Indian after the loss of tigers from a protected reserve. She was also a member of the National Ganga River Basin Authority set up by the Indian Government to develop effective measures to conserve and clean up the Ganga.

In 2008, Narain delivered the K. R. Narayanan Oration at the Australian National University entitled, Why environmentalism needs equity. She argued for an environmentalism of the poor, emphasising equity, climate justice, sustainable development and the need for developing countries to pursue growth without repeating the environmentally damaging path of industrialised nations.

In 2020, she served on the commission, A future for the world's children?, which was led by the WHO, UNICEF and The Lancet and co-chaired by Helen Clark and Awa Coll-Seck. It highlighted climate change, environmental degradation and unhealthy commercial pressures as major threats to children's futures and called for policies that place children's wellbeing and environmental sustainability at the centre of development decisions.

In 2021, TIME surveyed Narain to help determine the most feasible and highest-priority interventions for preventing future pandemics. Narain expressed concern about the lack of priority given to ecosystem protection and changes in food habits, citing issues such as factory farming, air pollution, and inadequate sanitation and clean water as contributors to the spread of infectious diseases.

Since 2021, she has been a member of Earth4All, the Club of Rome commission on 21st century transformational economics. She has also served on Institute for Sustainable Development and International Relations strategic advisory council – and was also a scientific committee member of the European Chair for Sustainable Development and Climate Transition at Sciences Po. In 2023, Narain served on the COP28 advisory committee. She served as a trustee of CIFOR–ICRAF and chaired the advisory committee of the Wellcome Trust's Climate Research Partnerships.

== Awards ==
In 2004, Narain received the Chameli Devi Jain Award for Outstanding Women Mediaperson for "bringing environmental issues to the mainstream". The following year, she was awarded the Padma Shri by the Government of India. CSE, under her leadership, was awarded the Stockholm Water Prize in 2005.

She was granted an honorary doctorate of science by the University of Calcutta in 2009. She also received honorary doctorates from the University of Lausanne and the University of Alberta. She received the Raja-Lakshmi Award from the Sri Raja-Lakshmi Foundation in 2009. She was awarded the IAMCR's Climate Change Communication Research in Action award in 2016 and was an Edinburgh Medal recipient in 2020.

== Personal life ==
Narain was injured in a traffic collision whilst cycling near the All India Institute of Medical Sciences in October 2013. She was hit by a car as she was travelling to Lodhi Gardens from her home in Green Park. The driver did not stop and Narain was taken to AIIMS by a passerby. She sustained facial wounds and orthopaedic injuries, and was discharged after 11 days. She had reconstructive surgery on her nose, and two metal rods were implanted to support her broken wrists.

== Selected publications ==
- Towards Green Villages: A Strategy for Environmentally-Sound and Participatory Rural Development (1989)
- Global Warming in an Unequal World: A Case of Environmental Colonialism (1991)
- Towards a Green World: Should Environmental Management be built on Legal Conventions or Human Rights? (1992)
- Dying Wisdom: Rise, Fall and Potential of India's Traditional Water Harvesting Systems (1997)
- Green Politics: Global Environmental Negotiations (1999)
- The State of India's Environment: The Citizens' Fifth Report (1999)
- Making Water Everybody's Business: The Practice and Policy of Water Harvesting (2001)
- Conflicts of Interest: My Journey through India's Green Movement (2017)
- Recovery of Tigers in India: Critical introspection and potential lessons (2021)

Conflicts of Interest (Penguin Random House India, 2017) was praised by reviewer Runa Sarker as "an excellent record of [Narain and the CSE's] efforts, outcomes, and how it has shaped policy", although Sarker felt that in some respects the book failed to address the complexities involved, and that "the conflicts of interest [were] deeper and wider than projected" in the book.
