= Down to Earth (magazine) =

Indian science and environment magazine

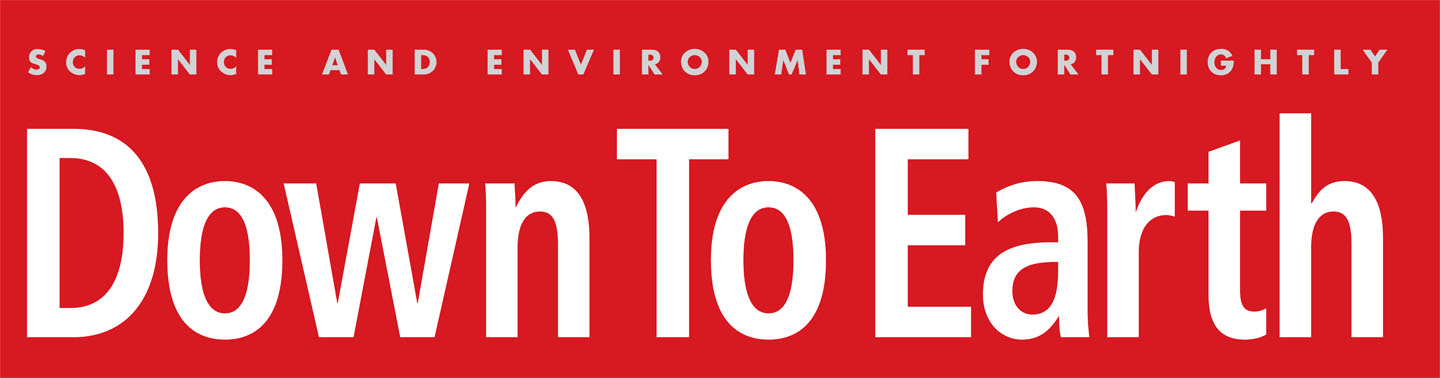
- Logo
- Editor: Sunita Narain
- Categories: Environment, science, nature
- Frequency: Fortnightly
- Circulation: 70,000 copies (2017)
- First issue: May 1992
- Company: Centre for Science and Environment
- Country: India
- Based in: New Delhi
- Language: English, Hindi
- Website: www.downtoearth.org.in

Down to Earth is a fortnightly magazine focused on politics of environment and development, published in New Delhi, India. The Centre for Science and Environment (CSE) assists in the production of the magazine.

== About ==
It was started in 1992 by environmentalist Anil Agarwal, with a commitment to make people aware of the challenges of environment and development and to create informed change agents. Indian environmentalist Sunita Narain, director general at CSE, is the current editor. The fortnightly format was created specifically to supplement the research, analyses and documentation efforts of CSE, also founded by Anil Agarwal in 1980. The objective / founding principles of the magazine, as envisioned in the first editorial, was to "fill a critical information gap’ rather than ‘capture a share of the information market". Reportage and analysis is geared to enable an increasingly young India with information and analysis from villages, fields, factories and labs, places where the mainstream media has vacated.

In October 2016, Down To Earth launched a Hindi edition of the magazine, with exclusive coverage as well as repurposed content from DTE English edition. The Hindi edition was launched to serve a long-standing need to serve the large Hindi-speaking audiences in the country, especially in the Hindi speaking heartland, and to begin a conversation on environment, development and sustainability concerns with them.

== Divisions and initiatives ==
Down To Earth Books is the magazine's publishing wing. It publishes two annuals: State of India's Environment and State of India's Environment In Figures, the country's only annual survey on the environment. The latter is a completely data-driven annual statement on the state of India's environment published every World Environment Day.

The Young Environmentalist is a Down to Earth and Gobar Times initiative to promote environmental awareness among the young and curious.

== Recognition ==
The magazine won the Ozone Award for its reportage in 2017, and its writers have won many national and international fellowships. It won the Greenaccord International Media Award in 2013.
