= Annelisa Kilbourn =

British conservationist, veterinarian and wildlife expert (1967–2002)

- Born: Annelisa Marcelle Kilbourn; 27 June 1967; Zürich, Switzerland
- Died: 2 November 2002 (aged 35); Lope Nature Preserve, Gabon
- Education: University of Connecticut; Tufts University Veterinary School
- Occupations: Conservationist; Veterinarian; Wildlife expert
- Years active: 1996–2002
- Awards: Global 500 Roll of Honour

Annelisa Marcelle Kilbourn (27 June 1967 – 2 November 2002) was a British conservationist, veterinarian and wildlife expert. She worked in Malaysia guarding free-ranging elephants and orangutans and protecting Sumatran rhinoceros and in Madagascar studying ring-tailed lemurs. Kilbourn went on to work at the Lincoln Park Zoo and Shedd Aquarium in Chicago. In Gabon, she established that wild gorillas were susceptible to death of the Ebola virus and could be transmitted to humans through hunting and eating infected species. In 2003, Kilbourn was posthumously elected to the Global 500 Roll of Honour by the United Nations Environment Programme.

== Early life and education ==
On 27 June 1967, Kilbourn was a British citizen born in Zürich, Switzerland. She was the daughter of Hans and Barry Kilbourn; her father was working as a chemist in Zürich. Kilbourn has one sister. She went on to reside in Belgium before relocating to Westport, Connecticut in 1981. Kilbourn was fluent in seven languages: Dutch, English, French, German, Malgache, Malay and Swahili. She expressed an interest in becoming a veterinarian from the age of six or seven and, while in high school, volunteered at Westport's Nature Centre, regularly taking wounded animals home for treatment. Kilbourn studied environmental biology and French at the University of Connecticut, from which she graduated in 1990. Her adviser discerned her academic ability and encouraged her to apply for an East African internship. In 1996, Kilbourn graduated from Tufts University Veterinary School with a veterinary medicine degree.

== Career ==
Following her graduation from Tufts University, she got a Wildlife Health Fellowship from the Wildlife Conservation Society to study orangutans in Sabah, Malaysia. Between 1996 from 1998, Kilbourn helped to guard and relocate free-ranging elephants and orangutans and to protect the 30 remaining Sumatran rhinoceros. She also studied ring-tailed lemurs in Madagascar, and helped orangutans trapped in the Malaysian rain forest by agricultural development. When Kilbourn completed the project, she worked at the Lincoln Park Zoo and Shedd Aquarium in Chicago as part of a post-doctorate programme from 1998 to 2000. At Shedd, she put on aquatic gear to assist in the tending of ailing dolphins and whales and was instrumental in forming the aquarium's Amazon Rising exhibit guiding visitors "through a misty river-basin forest where piranhas, arowanas and other species peer through lush greenery". Kilbourn went on to accept a permanent post at the Shedd but did work with the SOS Rhino project to save the rhinoceros in Borneo and with the Wildlife Conservation Society in Central Africa.

While working in Central Africa, she deployed modern technology such as global positioning systems and computerised tracking systems in the study of wildlife navigation. Kilbourn also spoke in French to programme software to enable squads to compile data on hand-held devices. She frequently lived in the jungle consuming peanut butter for protein and sometimes used generators at the camps she set up or was frequently unable to contact the outside world for weeks. Kilbourn established on-site laboratories at multiple locations for trained project individuals to conduct analysis of biological samples. In May 2001, she flew to Gabon to begin part of the Wildlife Conservation Society's gorilla health evaluation and monitoring programme, developing protocols with multiple organisations working in gorilla conservation to try to prevent transmittable diseases between animals and humans.

In October 2001, while still in Gabon, she and other project leaders were asked to venture to Congo and northern Gabon to investigate an outbreak of the tropical Ebola virus, which killed humans, at least 30 gorillas and 12 chimpanzees in villages close to the border with Congo and Gabon. Kilbourn collected samples of blood and tissue from deceased gorillas in the jungle and determined wild gorillas were susceptible to death of the Ebola virus as well as finding out the disease could be transmitted to humans through hunting and the consumption of infected species. She also found that hunting from indigenous population also contributed to the decline in the gorilla population and attempted to persuade the population to not consume ape meat.

== Death ==
On 2 November 2002, while the plane she was travelling in was about to land in an animal reserve in the Lope Nature Preserve in Gabon, she was killed when it crashed. Three others in the plane were unhurt. A memorial service for Kilbourn was held at Bronx Zoo on the afternoon on 15 November 2002.

== Legacy ==
The Wildlife Conservation Society set up a memorial fund in Kilbourn's name to assist veterinarians in other countries. In June 2003, she was posthumously elected to the Global 500 Roll of Honour by the United Nations Environment Programme at a ceremony in Beirut, Lebanon "for her exceptional work in protecting the environment."
