= Gobar Times =

- First Issue, May, 1998
- Categories: Children's Environment Magazine
- Frequency: Monthly
- First issue: May 1998
- Company: Centre for Science and Environment
- Country: India
- Based in: New Delhi
- Language: English
- Website: Gobar Times - Official Website Centre for Science and Environment- Official Website

Gobar Times is a monthly environmental education magazine for the young adult, published by the Centre for Science and Environment. It is published along with Down to Earth as a supplement. The magazine was first published in May, 1998 and has widespread circulation across India and abroad. The icon of the magazine, Pandit Gobar Ganesh, the pondering panditji is an Indian elderly who takes the reader through current issues, subjects and ideas relating to the environment. He is the icon whose brains can be picked for anything on earth. The current editor of the magazine is Sorit Gupto.

"Gobar" is the Hindi and Nepali word for "cow dung". It was chosen to capture the eco-philosophy and tradition of generating wealth from waste. Waste gobar serves as an insecticide and is used to plaster mud houses and is a waterproof coating for walls. It is also used to plaster floors to keep them cool. Gobar is the energy source for rural India. It is used as cooking fuel where people have no access to fuels like LPG. The greatest use of cow dung in India is in farming where it is used as natural manure for farmers' crops. In short, it's a mainstay of rural India, and an appropriate symbol for eco-friendly technology.

Anil Agarwal the founder-director of Centre for Science and Environment, India’s leading environmental NGO, aptly called ‘Gobar’ the symbol that embodies the spirit of the Indian environmental movement. As he correctly reflected, the widespread and diverse use of gobar in Indian society stands up to every principle of good environmentalism.

== History ==
In May 1992, the Society for Environmental Communications started India’s only science and environment fortnightly, Down To Earth (DTE). Over the years the magazine has informed and inspired people about environmental threats facing India and the world - a dimension underplayed in mainstream media. In May, 1998, Gobar Times was first published as a supplement to DTE. Gobar Times reaches out to the young, encouraging them to take the lead and make a difference. It informs them and encourages them to save the environment by becoming an action-oriented, knowledgeable and aware community. The tone of the magazine is light-hearted, simple and thought-provoking. Every month the magazine comes up with an activity related center spread which can be pulled out and put up as a poster to encourage readers to become active participants. The magazine has recently entered into a partnership with the leading newspaper Hindustan Times. Readers can now get a glimpse of what Pandit Gobar Ganesh has to say as they read HTNext.

== Green Schools Program ==
Conceptualized by the New Delhi–based Centre for Science and Environment(CSE), The Gobar Times Green Schools Program allows self-assessment of the environmental practices of a school by its students, using the "Green Schools Manual". This inspection or survey of environmental practices at schools is a way for them to audit their immediate environment across the key areas of water, air, land, energy and waste.

- Water: To make the school water literate and teach ways of rainwater harvesting and recycling of waste water.
- Air: Students check out the transport system of the school and understand how people commute to school. This further enables them to understand how transport policies affect air quality and how they can innovate and find ways of reducing emissions.
- Land: The different plant and animal species on the school campus are identified by the students and a survey done on the use of pesticides in the school. Understanding the concept of carrying capacity.
- Energy: The students study electricity and other forms of energy consumption on the school campus and explore ways in which it can be minimized.
- Waste: Students find out how much and what type of waste the school is producing? Learn composting and waste segregation methods in the process.
- Food: To make the students more conscious of the kind of food being promoted and consumed.

By the end of it all the program gives the students an opportunity to give a report card to the school on its environmental performance and practices. They conduct the audit with the help of an interesting handbook called the 'Green Schools Program Manual' (2019 Edition). This manual gives them step by step guidelines on how to conduct an environmental audit in the school.

The purpose of the Green Schools Program is to encourage and support schools to build up an environmentally aware, active and skilled community of teachers, students and parents. The schools may use the manual as part of their environmental studies program or to conduct activities in eco-clubs. The data collected by students is compiled and rated such that it becomes a self-assessment tool of environmental practices followed by the school. The aim of the rating is, to understand what can be done to improve the schools performance on its environmental sustainability index and to implement measurable changes over the coming years.

=== Awards ===
The Gobar Times Green Schools Awards is a platform to acknowledge and reward schools that have adopted the most innovative and effective practices to manage natural resources within their own premises. Schools send in their green reports to CSE. These reports undergo rigorous verification and selection and the best schools are awarded annually.

Award ceremony for Green Schools Program

The top 10 schools of the country which have been working and have implemented tremendous improvement in their environmental practices are awarded the 'Change Makers' award. Schools participating for the first time are considered in the 'New Schools' category. They are judged basis involvement of students and teachers, and the quality of the reports submitted. Also schools which do not necessarily audit all areas but do exceptionally well in a single specific area of water, energy, land, air or waste apply for the coveted 'Best Managers' award.

=== Partners ===
The National Green Corps is a program of the Ministry of Environment and Forest, Government of India). State nodal offices and CSE partner in many states across India. As the Green Schools network is expanding, the awards are now also organized at the state level. The most resource efficient schools at the state level in different categories are nominated by state nodal agencies to compete for national awards with CSE in Delhi.
