= Global 500 Roll of Honour =

UN environmental award (1987–2003)

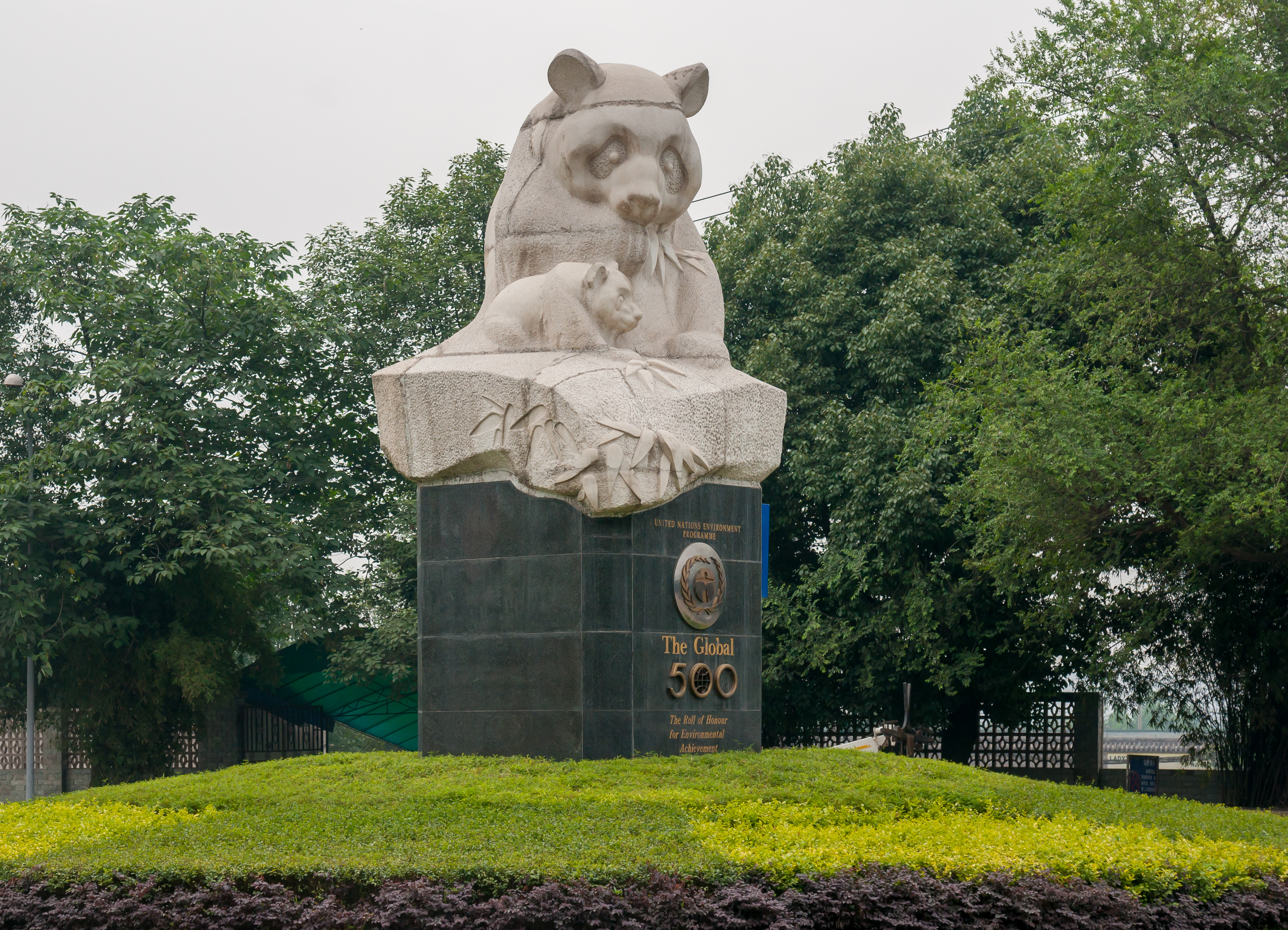
- Monument in recognition of the Chengdu Research Base of Giant Panda Breeding receiving the UNEP award
- Description: Recognizing environmental achievements of individuals and organizations
- Country: International
- Presented by: United Nations Environment Programme (UNEP)
- Website: http://www.global500.org/

The Global 500 Roll of Honour was an award given from 1987 to 2003 by the United Nations Environment Programme (UNEP). The award recognized the environmental achievements of individuals and organizations around the world. A successor system of UNEP awards called Champions of the Earth started in 2005.

== Awardees ==
Since the inception of the award in 1987, over 719 individuals and organizations, in adult and youth categories, have been honoured with the Global 500 award. Among prominent winners are:

- Anil Agarwal, prominent environmentalist from India
- Seth Sunday Ajayi, African conservationist, Nigerian scholar and wildlife expert
- Stephen O. Andersen, prominent US environmentalist, for efforts on stratospheric ozone protection
- Sir David Attenborough, producer of environmental television programmes
- Idelisa Bonnelly, 1987 Dominican Republic marine biologist who created the first humpback whale sanctuary
- Gro Harlem Brundtland, former prime minister of Norway
- Jimmy Carter, former president of the United States; later won the Nobel Peace Prize
- Jacques-Yves Cousteau, French marine explorer
- Jane Goodall, of the United Kingdom, whose research on wild chimpanzees and olive baboons provided insight into the lives of non-human primates
- Annelisa Kilbourn, British conservationist, veterinarian and wildlife expert
- Gabriel Lewis-Charles, prominent environmentalist from St Lucia
- Wangari Maathai, founder of the Green Belt Movement, a Kenyan grassroots environmental organisation; later won the Nobel Peace Prize
- Harada Masazumi, Japanese medical researcher heavily involved in the study of Minamata disease
- Francisco "Chico" Mendes, Brazilian rubber tapper who was murdered during his fight to save the Amazon rainforest
- George Monbiot, British journalist and researcher
- Nikita Moiseyev, prominent Russian scientist, leading expert on nuclear winter
- Ken Saro-Wiwa, environmental and human rights activist from Nigeria who was executed for leading the resistance of the Ogoni people against the pollution of their Delta homeland
- Andrew Simmons, environmental activist and educator
- Severn Suzuki, environmental activist
- Lily Venizelos, Greek conservationist, founder and president of the Mediterranean Association to Save the Sea Turtles

Prominent laureates
Name	Year	Category Adult/youth	Organization/ individual	Country
Robert Redford	1987	Adult	Individual	US
National Geographic Society	1987	Adult	Organization	US
Soichiro Honda	1987	Adult	Individual (deceased)	Japan
Green Belt Movement, Womenaid International	1987	Adult	Organization	United Kingdom
Greenpeace International	1988	Adult	Organization	Netherlands
Jimmy Carter	1988	Adult	Individual	US
Calestous Juma	1993	Adult	Individual	US
Prince Philip, Duke of Edinburgh	1994	Adult	Individual	United Kingdom
Paul Josef Crutzen	1996	Adult	Individual	Germany
BBC World Service Education Department	1997	Adult	Organization	United Kingdom
Jane Goodall	1997	Adult	Individual	United Kingdom
The Nation	1997	Adult	Organization	Thailand
Sylvia Earle	1998	Adult	Individual	US
Greening Australia	1998	Adult	Organization	Australia
Fyodor Konyukhov	1998	Adult	Individual	Russia
Yuri Mikhailovich Luzhkov	1998	Adult	Individual	Russia
Don Merton	1998	Adult	Individual (deceased)	New Zealand
Verna Simpson	1999	Adult	Individual	Australia
Toyota Motor Club	1999	Adult	Organization	Japan
Sreekumar Krishnan Nair	1999	Adult	Individual	India
Fuji Xerox Australia	2000	Adult	Organization	Australia
Conservation Volunteers Australia	2000	Youth	Organization	Australia
Nantawarrina, the first Indigenous Protected Area in the world	2000	Adult	Organization	Australia
Laurel Springs School	1990	Adult	Organization	US
Paul Winter	1987	Adult	Individual	US
Anil Agarwal	1987	Adult	Individual (deceased)	India
Daphne Sheldrick	1992	Adult	Individual (deceased)	United Kingdom
Haller Park		Adult	Organization	Mombasa
Environmental Investigation Agency	2017	Adult	Organization	United States / United Kingdom

== See also ==
- Environmental Media Awards
- Global Environmental Citizen Award
- Goldman Environmental Prize
- Grantham Prize for Excellence in Reporting on the Environment
- Heroes of the Environment
- Tyler Prize for Environmental Achievement
- List of environmental awards
