= El Ecologista =

Spanish quarterly environmental magazine

- Categories: Environmental magazine
- Frequency: Quarterly
- Founded: 1999
- Country: Spain
- Based in: Madrid
- Language: Spanish
- Website: El Ecologista
- ISSN: 1575-2712
- OCLC: 723710778

El Ecologista is a Spanish quarterly magazine with a special focus on environment which is owned by Ecologistas en Acción based in Madrid, Spain. It has been in circulation since 1999.

== History and profile ==
El Ecologista was launched by Ecologistas en Acción in 1999. Its first issue was numbered 17 to reflect the fact that it was the continuation of a magazine with the same name which was established in 1979. The headquarters of El Ecologista is in Madrid.

The magazine is published on a quarterly basis and covers articles on climate, biodiversity, genetic engineering, forest, energy, pollution, radioactive waste, transports and natural resources.

== See also ==
- The Ecologist
