= Andrew Simmons (journalist) =

British journalist

Andrew Simmons is a broadcast journalist, currently working with Al Jazeera English. In recent years, he has specialised in covering the conflicts of the Arab Spring.

== Career ==
Simmons joined Al Jazeera English in 2005, in the run-up to its launch. His original brief was to help set up the East Africa bureau and, immediately following the launch in 2006, he remained at the Nairobi bureau as Bureau Chief and senior correspondent.

Following his next appointment, as a senior correspondent based in the London broadcast-centre, in 2011 he covered the downfalls of Gaddafi in Libya and Mubarak in Egypt.

In 2013, he moved to the main broadcast-centre, in Doha in Qatar, still as a roving correspondent and presenter. The main purpose of this move was to cover the war in Syria from inside the country, reporting on the conflict first-hand. However, when the Westgate mall attack took place in Kenya, he returned briefly to Nairobi, to cover events in the city which had once been his home and for which he had a particular expertise in the local places, politics and peoples. Later, he returned to the Near East, to cover the strain on Lebanon's small population and economy, of hosting the huge new wave of refugees from Syria, in addition to the older wave from Palestine.

Before joining Al Jazeera English, Simmons was West Africa Correspondent for BBC TV News. He had previously been a presenter in the United Kingdom, for the BBC News channel.

When Simmons was with Sky News, he worked as a correspondent in an investigative unit.

For more than 15 years, Simmons served as a correspondent with ITN, the much-respected UK news channel. His experience in covering conflict included Northern Ireland, where he spent four years based in Belfast, plus extensive assignments in: Chechnya, Bosnia, Iraq, Iran and Sri Lanka. At the end of the first Gulf War, he covered the 1991 uprising in Iraq by the Shia population of Basra and was captured by the Iraqi Republican Guard. He was released ten days later, in Baghdad.

== Awards ==
In 1991, Simmons received a UK Royal Television Society award for his coverage of the exodus of the Kurdish people during the conflict in Iraq.
