= E&E News =

American news organization

- Logo since Politico acquisition
- Type: News organization; Trade publications
- Owner: Politico
- Founders: Kevin Braun; Michael Witt
- Executive editor: Cyril T. Zaneski
- Founded: 1998
- Ceased publication: 2026
- Headquarters: 1000 Wilson Blvd, 8th Floor
- City: Arlington, Virginia, U.S.
- Website: www.eenews.net

E&E News (branded as E&E News by POLITICO; previously known as Environment and Energy Publishing) was an American news publication owned by Politico that covered energy and the environment, as well as pertinent climate and natural resource policy news. E&E News included five publications: Climatewire, E&E Daily, Energywire, Greenwire, and E&E News PM.

The organization was founded in 1998 and was acquired by Politico in 2020. At the time, the organization employed over 65 staff reporters and editors located across the United States. After the acquisition, Politico integrated E&E News into its Politico Pro platform; select content from E&E News publications can be accessed through either the E&E News or Politico Pro websites. (Note: See, for example, this 2025 E&E Daily article, available to subscribers at either E&E News or Politico Pro.)

In 2026, Politico shut down E&E News as a separate publication and brand, folding its staff and reporting into Politico Pro as part of a revamp of the company's energy and environment coverage.

== History and business model ==
Environment and Energy Publishing was founded in 1998 by Kevin Braun and Michael Witt. The company launched with less than ten employees. It was founded as a clipping service on Capitol Hill and later became a weekly newsletter. It was taken online by its founders in 2000. That year, their organization gained a group of subscribers when they bought Greenwire from the National Journal.

In 2014, all E&E News content was locked behind paywalls. As of 2025, select articles were available for non-subscribers.

As a niche trade publication, E&E targeted institutions for subscriptions, including think tanks, energy companies, non-governmental organizations, law firms, and government agencies. Institutional subscribers include universities such as the University of Iowa, Indiana University, and the University of Washington. In 2014, annual subscriptions cost between $2,000 and $150,000, depending on the range of products subscribed to, and E&E Publishing employed roughly 75 journalists in ten cities across the United States.

In 2018, E&E News announced that Kevin Braun would be stepping down as editor-in-chief while remaining an owner and principal. Bloomberg gave Braun's resignation as an example of the #MeToo movement's effects. Cy Zaneski was named as Braun's successor.

In May of 2018, E&E News, along with the Associated Press and CNN, was barred from a national summit on harmful water contaminants by the Trump administration's Environmental Protection Agency. In July 2020, The Hill reported that the U.S. Environmental Protection Agency had cancelled its subscription to E&E News.

E&E News was acquired by newspaper Politico in December 2020. Terms of the deal were not disclosed. Politico said it would keep the E&E News brand and its journalism in place. As a property of Politico, E&E News was bundled into Politico Pro, and an E&E subscription was available as an addon to select Politico Pro packages.

In June 2026, Semafor reported that Politico planned to discontinue the E&E News brand. The brand was shut down in August. Politico move the former E&E News staff to five new energy and environment newsletters.

== Publications and content ==
Until 2011, E&E News had a content-sharing partnership with The New York Times. Pieces from E&E's Climatewire were sometimes republished by Scientific American.

As of 2025, the E&E News suite of publications consisted of:

- Climatewire (launched in 2008)
- Energywire (launched in 2012)
- Greenwire (acquired from the National Journal in 2000)
- E&E Daily
- E&E News PM

The executive editor of E&E News was Cyril T. "Cy" Zaneski, as of 2025.

In 2025, Politico stated that most subscribers to E&E News were in the private sector.
