= ReNew =

Renew: technology for a sustainable future
- Editor: Nathan Scolaro
- Categories: Green building, renewable energy
- Frequency: Quarterly
- First issue: June 1980
- Company: Alternative Technology Association
- Country: Australia
- Based in: Melbourne
- Language: English
- Website: Renew magazine

Renew magazine (currently subtitled Renew: technology for a sustainable future, and formerly stylised as ReNew) is an Australian magazine covering domestic renewable energy technologies and sustainable culture. Originally a small magazine, printed and distributed locally in Melbourne, it was first published by the Alternative Energy Co-operative (subsequently renamed the Alternative Technology Association, and now also known as Renew) in 1980 as Soft Technology: Alternative Energy in Australia. Although it sold for a cover price of only 85 cents, the magazine's circulation increased so rapidly that by issue 35, published in February 1991, it included a full-color cover. The price was increased from $2.50 to $3 and national distribution rights were secured for issue 40, published in June of the following year. A total of 13,000 copies were printed. The magazine was renamed, after much deliberation, under the present title in 1996.

Renew magazine currently has an estimated readership of around 69,000 (from around printed 21,000 copies and over 2000 digital copies each quarter), covering topics such as energy-efficient appliances for home heating and cooling, water heating, water-saving products and techniques, electric vehicles, sustainable building products and designs, resource recycling and more. It now sells for $9.90 and it celebrated its 150th issue in early 2020.

With the recent closing of Home Power magazine in the US, Renew is one of the few technically oriented sustainability magazines still published for the general public.

== See also ==
- Home Power
