= Journal of Contemporary Water Research & Education =

Journal

- Language: English
- Edited by: Christopher Lant

Publication details
- Former name(s): Water Resources Update
- History: 1964-present
- Publisher: Universities Council on Water Resources
- Frequency: Triannual

Standard abbreviations
- ISO 4: J. Contemp. Water Res. Educ.

Indexing
- ISSN: 1936-7031

The Journal of Contemporary Water Research & Education is a triannual peer-reviewed scientific journal covering research on water resources published by the Universities Council on Water Resources.

== Background ==
The journal was established in 1964 as Water Resources Update and obtained its current title in 2004. The journal is abstracted and indexed in the Emerging Sources Citation Index. The editors-in-chief are Karl Williard and Jackie Crim (Southern Illinois University).
