= Bellona – St. Petersburg =

Environmental rights NGO based in Saint Petersburg, Russia

Bellona Foundation
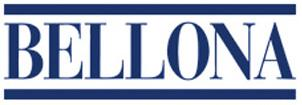
- Company type: NGO
- Industry: Environmentalism and environmental rights
- Founded: April 1998
- Headquarters: Saint Petersburg, Russia
- Area served: Russia
- Key people: Alexander Nikitin
- Number of employees: 17
- Website: www.bellona.ru

Bellona – St. Petersburg was a branch of the Norwegian environmental rights organization Bellona Foundation.

The St. Petersburg office of Bellona Foundation (ERC Bellona) was founded in April 1998 following the trials of such activists as Fedorov–Mirzoyanov, Nikolai Shchur, and Alexander Nikitin, who had begun to distribute information about environmental threats and were being persecuted by the very agencies responsible for causing these threats. ERC Bellona was located in the center of St. Petersburg, on Suvorovsky Prospect.

ERC Bellona's stated goals were to protect unspoiled natural resources and reliable environmental information.

== History ==
The branch's mission statement was to "defend the right to unspoiled natural resources" in Russia. Bellona St. Petersburg had three major goals detailed on its website. The first goal termed their "legal direction," was to extend legal help to Russian citizens in defense of their right to unspoiled natural resources. The second goal, their "informational direction", aimed to increase awareness of environmental safety law through its website and quarterly magazine, Ecology and Law. The third goal, their "expert assessment direction," aimed to provide expert assistance on energy safety.

Each year, ERC Bellona would carry out at least five different projects, the results of which were published on its website, in the form of annual reports.

The organization closed its offices in Russia, in November 2022, citing the invasion of Ukraine as a major reason for the closure. The activities of the St. Petersburg office have been moved to Vilnius, Lithuania.

== Staff ==
The staff of ERC Bellona consisted of permanent employees, part-time personnel, and volunteers. Some staff members include:

- Alexander Nikitin, Council Chairman of ERC Bellona's Director's Board
- Yuri Schmidt, attorney, council member of ERC Bellona's Directors Board, president of Lawyers for Human Rights
- Nikolay Rybakov, executive director of ERC Bellona
