= New York State Conservationist =

- Editor: Maria VanWie
- Categories: Outdoor
- Frequency: bi-monthly
- First issue: 1946
- Company: New York State Department of Environmental Conservation
- Country: United States
- Language: English
- ISSN: 0010-650X

The New York State Conservationist is a bimonthly, ad-free magazine published by New York's Department of Environmental Conservation (DEC). The magazine was founded in 1946 by Clayton B. Seagears, who was the Director of Conservation Education for what was then the New York State Conservation Department.

It carries articles on environmental and conservation issues around the state DEC is involved with, plus outdoor recreation opportunities on DEC land.

The magazine bills itself as "New York's Premiere Outdoor Magazine: Bringing Nature to Your Door." It enjoys the reputation as being one of the oldest continually produced outdoor publications in this country.

== See also ==
- Eastern Cougar
