= UK Educational Evidence Portal =

The UK educational evidence portal (eep) is an online resource providing easy access to published research and evidence-based guidance across all areas of education, and related aspects of children’s services. It was developed through collaboration between organisations to make research evidence more widely available to a range of audiences, including educational professionals, practitioners, policy makers and the research community.

== History ==
The portal went live in September 2007 and is funded by a number of organisations, including CfBT Education Trust, DCSF, BIS, TDA, Becta and National College for School Leadership. It is hosted by the EPPI-Centre at the Institute of Education, University of London and managed by a Development Group which meets approximately bi-monthly. A subset of this group meets as the Editorial Group which manages the content of the portal. CfBT Education Trust provides overall leadership.

== Searching ==
The portal has been cited as a useful information resource by various academic and Government sources in the UK and elsewhere. Eep can be searched in the following ways:

- Search websites - collections of documents from areas of a wide range of organisations contributing to eep
- Search eep database - individual documents that have been selected by a subset of organisations and indexed in greater detail by the British Education Index
- Explore key documents and links in specialised Resource Areas which focus on specific topics or educational communities.

== Development ==
Eep is currently developing the next release of the portal which will improve the search results for both new and more experienced users. There will be a subject list for browsing the database. Authors' names and British Education Thesaurus terms will be clickable so that related documents in the database are linked. A new text mining tool will provide automatic subject tags, on the fly, for both the database and website search.

== See also ==
- The Good Schools Guide
