= Ecologists in Action =

Ecologistas en Acción
- Formation: December 9, 1998; 27 years ago
- Type: NGO
- Legal status: Confederation of organizations
- Purpose: Ecological
- Headquarters: (Madrid); Peñuelas nº 12, bajo
- Coordinates: 40.422105°N 3.707349°W
- Region served: Spain
- Members: 34,000
- Website: http://www.ecologistasenaccion.org

Ecologistas en Acción (Spanish: Ecologistas en Acción, sometimes Ecologistas en Acción-CODA) is a Spanish grassroots confederation of 300 ecological groups, founded on December 9, 1998.

Ecologistas en Acción is aligned with the philosophy of social ecology, which regards all environmental problems (and many other social ones) as proceeding from the same source: an increasingly globalised sustainability. Following this line of reasoning, the model of production and consumption needs to be changed in order to solve the ecological crisis. For this to happen, Ecologistas en Acción organises campaigns for civil society's outreach on a great number of ecological and energy-related issues. Among them, public complaint about all actions that damage the environment. Ecologistas en Acción publishes its own magazine, El Ecologista, manages its own publishing house, Libros en Acción, and develops its online presence as Proyecto EcoSpip.

== History ==
Ecologistas en Acción was established in 1998 as a coalition of groups of socio-ecological orientation, many of them already organised in the Asociación Ecologista de Defensa de la Naturaleza or in the Coordinadora de Organizaciones de Defensa Ambiental (CODA), other groups were related to leftist political forces. The goal was to create a common organization under a single name, which would come up to have a public recognition comparable to already-existing NGOs such as Greenpeace, Fondo de la naturaleza, Tierra, or the Sociedad Ornitológica Española (SEO / BirdLife). At the meeting, some organisms decided not to take part inside this new organization, among them the Grupo Ornitológico from the Balearic Islands, also some groups from the Valencian Community. The majority of the Catalan organisms were already integrated in Ecologistas de Catalunya.

== Ideology ==
The organization is conformed by different groups, which in their turn contain members from varied political origins. Ecologistas en Acción is not linked to any political movement or party. However, its internal working based on direct democracy has attracted sectors from the general population which would not have originally been interested in ecological causes. The common denominator of its activities and associates is the defence of the environment within the ranks of social ecology. Their actions focus on condemnation of what they regard as actions opposed to the interests of the environment, in turning to legal actions in favour of the environment and in awareness campaigns. They also participate in the elaboration of viable alternatives in the diverse areas where they work.

== Structure ==
The confederation is structured in territorial lines, with a federation organised based on the autonomous communities of Spain. Yet, not all of the autonomous communities are represented in the confederation. Also, in those communities formed by multiple provinces of Spain and where Ecologistas en Acción is active, the federations at the level of autonomous communities are subdivided into provincial federations. Each federation is formed by local groups. These groups, independently of the number of associates or activists, have a vote in the yearly federal assembly of Ecologistas en Acción.

As of February 2009, Ecologists in Action is active in Andalusia (with the largest number of local groups, over 100), Aragón, Asturias, the Canary Islands, Cantabria, Castile and León, Castile-La Mancha, Catalonia, the Community of Madrid, the Basque Country, Extremadura, La Rioja, Navarre, the Valencian Community and the Region of Murcia, as well as in the autonomous cities of Ceuta and Melilla.

Functionally, the structure is the same as this in the different areas of work, focused on different environmental problems. Depending on the size of the groups, work in a given area is assigned to a particular "commission"; obviously, the smaller groups do not break down into commissions. These groupings along lines of areas of work are also important in bringing proposals to the confederal assembly.

== Areas of work ==
The areas of work, usually superposed, are identified as:

- Agroecology: fighting against genetically modified organisms and promotion of ecological agriculture
- Water: sustainable use of water resources, especially of continental waters; in particular, the campaign against the Spanish National Hydrological Plan (Plan Hidrológico Nacional, PHN)
- Animals: Ecologists in Action denounces activities it considers as constituting cruelty to animals
- Antiglobalization: campaigns against economic globalization (and other activities of international scope)
- Climate change: alert campaigns regarding global warming
- Consumption: denouncing the wasted caused by a productivist economy. Particularly dedicated in this area is the collective ConsumeHastaMorir ("ConsumeUntilYouDie"), with their satiric campaigns.
- Pollution: denouncing various forms of pollution, from air pollution to light pollution, among others.
- Education: denouncing the anti-environmental content in numerous textbooks and organizing environmental awareness campaigns.
- Energy: denouncing the environmental impacts of various forms of obtaining energy; this is, of course, linked to the area of climate change.
- Marine environment: promotes the sustainable exploitation of the marine environment and denounces episodes of danger of marine contamination, such as involved in the oil industry or inappropriate coastal development.
- Nature: promotes the protection of natural spaces, including the vías pecuarias (the routes in Spain used for transhumance, seasonal movement of people with their livestock) and denouncing aggressions against protected areas
- Heritage: denouncing aggressions against what in Spain is known as patrimonio histórico, the physical artifacts of the country's artistic and cultural traditions (historic buildings, landscapes, etc.).
- Residues: promoting the reduction of waste materials in modern production systems and denounces bad practices in the management of waste, including lack of interest in and support for recycling or uncontrolled disposal of hazardous waste.
- Transportation: denouncing the unsustainability of the current system of transport, based on private transport and the construction of high-speed rail or airports, and promoting sustainable means of transport such as public transport and bicycles.
- Urban planning: denouncing urbanistic abuses and the unsustainability of the modern urbanistic model.
- Legal defense: dedicated to supporting different groups in denouncing aggression against the environment, as well as elaborating normative proposals and training members of the organization.
