= Irish Organic Farmers and Growers Association =

The Irish Organic Farmers and Growers Association (IOFGA) certifies organic food and products throughout the island of Ireland. It is a voluntary organisation and a company limited by guarantee with a membership open to all. It was established in 1982.

IOFGA maintains a set of organic production and food processing standards, and operates an inspection scheme for certified members.

IOFGA publishes a bi-monthly magazine called Organic Matters.

== See also ==
- Organic certification
- Soil Association
