= Centre for Science and Environment =

Indian not-for-profit organisation

- Founded: 1980
- Founder: Anil Agarwal
- Type: Public interest research
- Location: New Delhi, India
- Region served: India
- Key people: [[Sunita Narain]
- Website: www.cseindia.org

Centre for Science and Environment (CSE) is a not-for-profit public interest research and advocacy organisation based in New Delhi, India. Established in 1980, CSE works as a think tank on environment-development issues in India, poor planning, climate shifts devastating India's Sundarbans and advocates for policy changes and better implementation of the already existing policies.

== History ==
The director of the centre is Sunita Narain. Under her leadership, the Centre for Science and Environment exposed the high level of pesticides present in American brands of soft drinks such as Coke and Pepsi.

In 2018 the CSE was awarded Indira Gandhi Prize for Peace, Disarmament and Development.

Some of its projects include investigating food adulteration and consumer product safety.

== See also ==
- Indian Council of Forestry Research and Education
- Down to Earth
- Gobar Times
- List of science centers#Asia
