= Ecology and Law =

Quarterly Russian-language magazine

- Editor-in-chief: Angelina Davydova
- Former editors: Egorenko Alexander
- Frequency: Quarterly
- Publisher: Bellona Foundation
- Founder: Grigory Pasko
- Founded: 2002
- Based in: Vilnius
- Language: Russian, English
- Website: bellona.ru/ecopravo/

Ecology and Law (Экология и Право) is a quarterly magazine published by the Bellona Environmental Transparency Center. Angelina Davydova has been its editor-in-chief since 2016. First published in Russia in 2002, publication subsequently moved to Lithuania. The main focus of the magazine is to promote environmental rights in Russia.

== Former editors ==
The magazine's founding editor from 2002 to 2008 was Grigory Pasko. According to Bellona's website, Pasko was imprisoned in 2002 for "coverage of the violations of nuclear safety at the naval bases of the Russian Pacific Fleet."
