= Home Power =

Bi-monthly American magazine

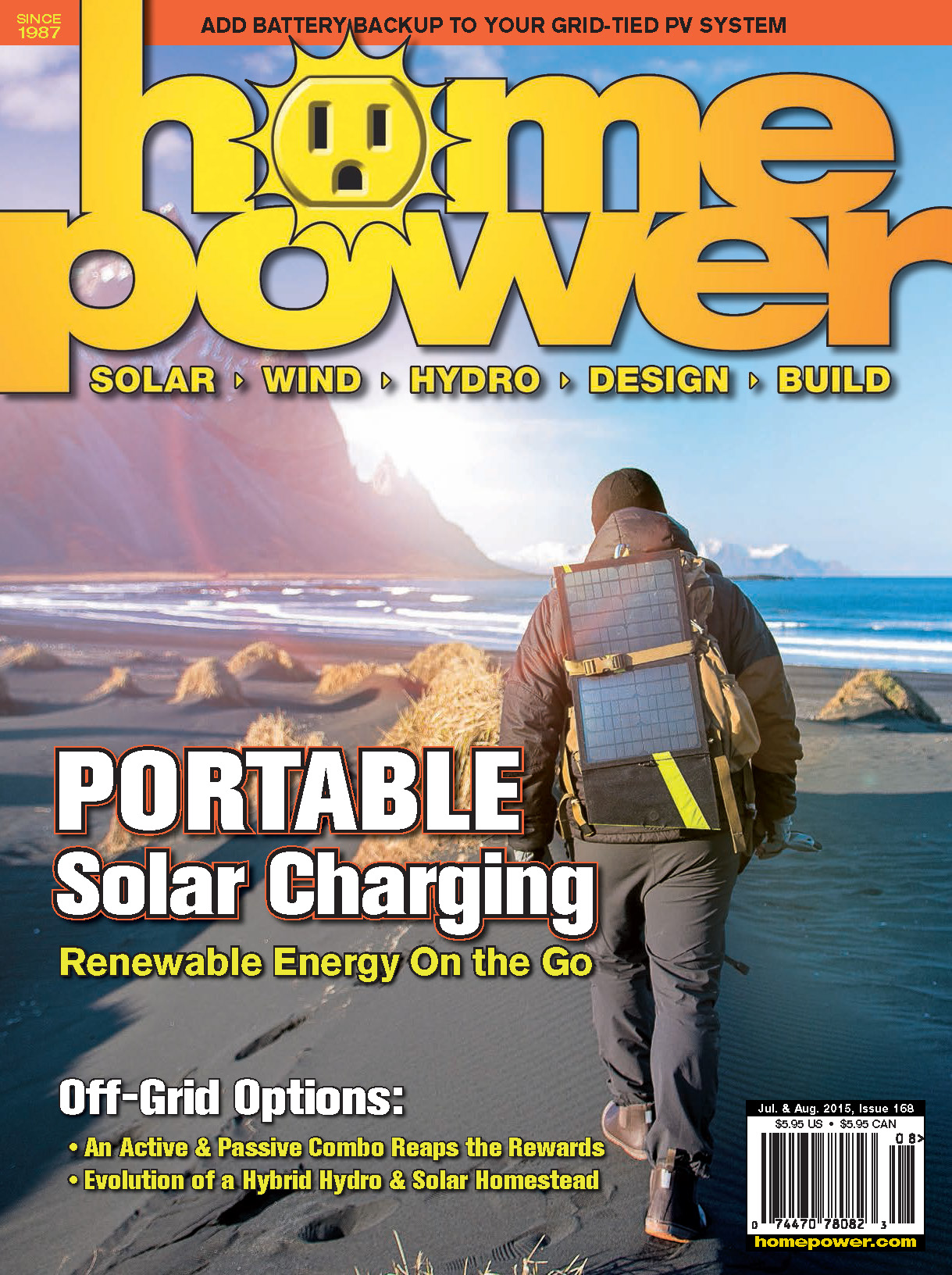
HomePowerCover, Issue#168

Home Power was a bi-monthly American magazine based in Ashland, Oregon. At one time it had a circulation greater than 100,000.

Published from October 1987 through November 2018, Home Power promoted a goal of reducing the use of fossil fuels for electricity generation by replacing fossil fuel generation capacity with currently available renewable electricity alternatives. Solar, wind, and hydro systems information were covered at a homeowner's do-it-yourself level with expert advice and examples. Home Power also provided information on energy efficient building and design practices. Electric vehicle information was also featured and its integration with renewable electricity systems and solar panels.

After ceasing publication at the end of 2018 the publishers made a downloadable archive of all past issues available for free from their web site.

== History ==
Richard and Karen Perez started Home Power in 1987. From the start the magazine itself had been published with the use of alternative energy resources. Its publishers lived the lifestyle they espouse. Home Power was a recognized leading provider of detailed information for home scale renewable energy installation. Its publishers, authors, and editors were cited in other industry publications and blogs.

At its founding, Home Power focused on off-grid systems and do-it-yourself (DIY) information for homeowners. Focusing on "home scale" renewable systems, the magazine did not typically cover utility scale renewable energy issues such as large wind farms or utility scale solar installations. The magazine recognized the up-tick of interest in, and expansion of, the grid-tied solar electric systems market for homeowners. More recently, the magazine covered both DIY systems and professionally installed grid-tied systems on its web site and print editions and in its articles, editorials, and advertising. It also covered broader subjects related to home-scale energy production, including green building, energy efficiency, and alternative transportation.

A controversial topic Home Power was once in support of (and coined the term for) is "Guerrilla Solar", (see Solar Guerrilla) or solar power installations by homeowners that are grid tied which are not permitted by the utilities they are tied to. This non-inspected practice has fallen out of favor given the cooperation of utilities with homeowners wishing to install solar, and states' enactment of net-metering regulations. Home Power continued until its end covering the topic by its coverage of micro-inverters and small systems that can safely and legally be tied to the grid.

Home Power also has a web presence. The former web site complemented the print edition with most past articles in HTML format, convenient because they are often referred to in current issues. The current web site allows free downloading of all past magazines in Acrobat format.

Because Home Power covered off-grid self-reliance it was a popular magazine in the prepper community.

Home Power published the final edition of Home Power magazine in November 2018. That November/December issue (HP188) ended the magazine's 31-year publishing run, and now makes all of the back issues available for free, at homepower.com.

== Recent initiatives ==
To fill a growing need for reliable information for renewable energy systems professionals Home Power also came out with an industry trade magazine: SolarPro.
