= Andrew Simmons (environmentalist) =

Vincentian Grenadinian environmentalist

- Born: Saint Vincent and the Grenadines
- Education: De Montfort University
- Honours: Goldman Environmental Prize (1994); Global 500 Roll of Honour (1989)

Andrew Augustus Simmons is an environmental activist from Saint Vincent and the Grenadines. He was awarded the 1989 United Nations Environment Programme Global 500 Roll of Honour and the 1994 Goldman Environmental Prize.

== Early life and education ==
Simmons is from Enhams, Saint Vincent. He originally trained in education. He completed a master's degree in economic development. In 2019 Simmons earned his doctoral degree at De Montfort University. His PhD considered the impact of climate change on young people and how communities can build resilience to mitigate its effects.

== Activism and career ==
Simmons launched the JEMS Progressive Community Organization in 1978. At the time he was a teacher and the only employed teenager in his community. He formed the environmental movement after Caribbean residents started to exploit the King's Hill Forest Reserve in response to increasing unemployment. Prior to 1972, 95% of the island were employed, but after the 1973 oil crisis hit and fuel costs increased the agricultural estates closed down. The King's Hill Forest Reserve was established in 1791, and is one of the oldest forest reserves in the Western hemisphere. It is of particular significance to Simmons as the Caribbean economy relies heavily on agriculture and tourism. To explain the importance of the reserve to the local community Simmons used festivals, plays and music. JEMS started a literacy programme and offered training to women in electrical wiring and construction. In 1989 Simmons was included in the United Nations Environment Programme Global 500 Roll of Honour.

He helped to initiate several projects relating to clean water and conservation, including teaching children at a local daycare centre and leading them on clean up campaigns. In the early nineties Simmons launched the Caribbean Youth Environment Network (CYEN). The CYEN has continued to develop, teaching young people from Saint Vincent and the Grenadines to be more vocal advocates for the protection of their islands. Together Simmons and the CYEN have monitored the changing environment of the Caribbean, with an increase in hurricanes, more intense rainy seasons and bleaching of coral reefs. CYEN have gone on to hold annual congresses; which have become the largest and most consistent young environmental conventions in the Caribbean. In 2008 Simmons became the first person to be inducted into the CYEN Hall of Fame.

He has worked with the United Nations Environment Programme on similar initiatives, encouraging young people all around the world to be more environmentally conscious. He has said that he focussed on young people because "the future of the earth itself is on the side of the children". In 2016 he hosted a workshop to empower local communities to strengthen their resilience to climate change. For this workshop Simmons worked with Otis Joslyn, technical director of the Caribbean Community Climate Change Centre.

Simmons moved to London in 1997 where he worked as the deputy director of Youth Affairs at the Commonwealth Office. He was awarded the Goldman Environmental Prize.
