= Sustain Europe =

British magazine

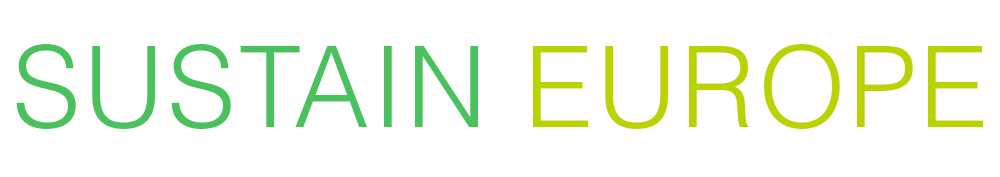

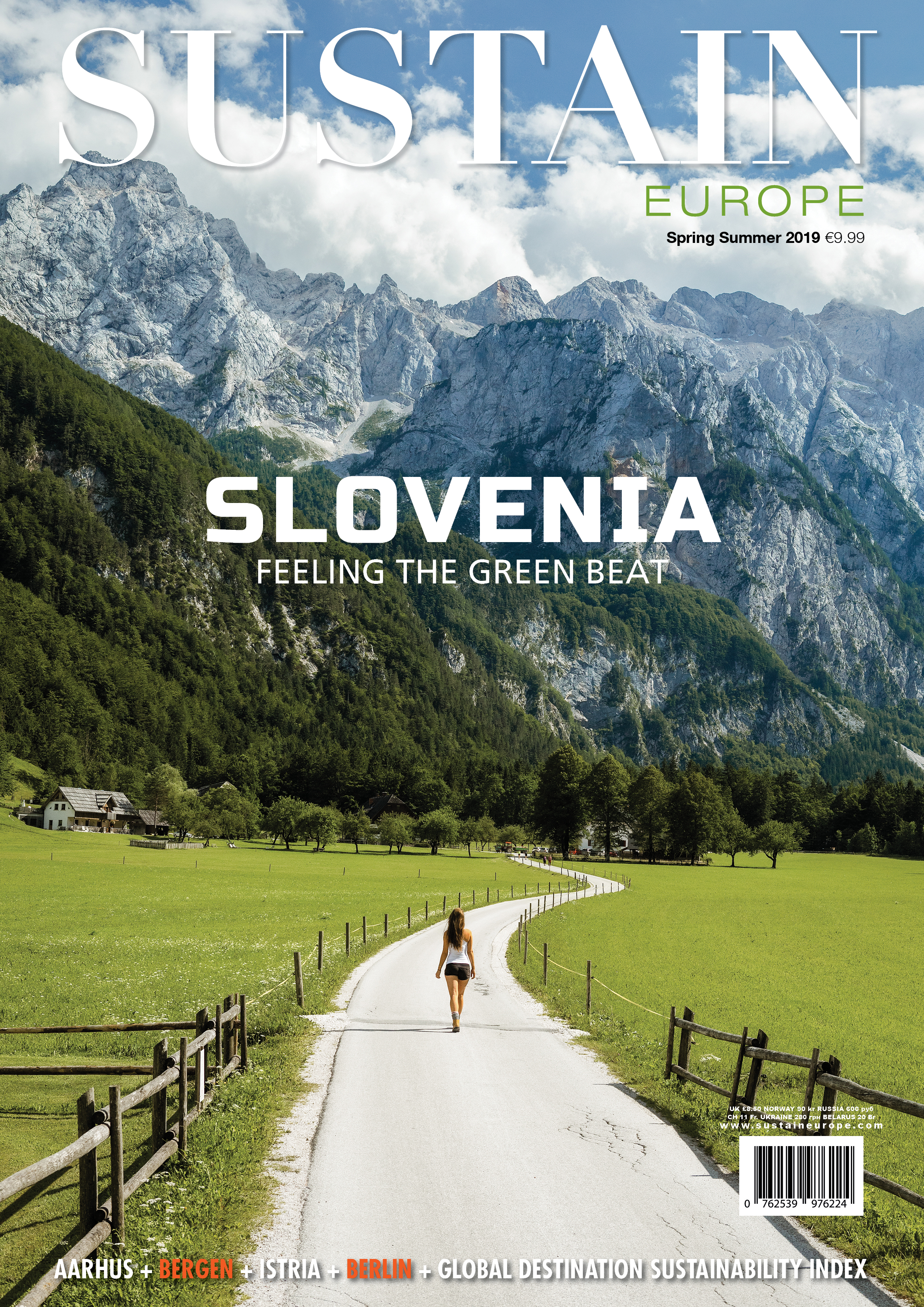
- Cover of Spring/Summer 2019 Edition
- Categories: Sustainability, Business, Travel, MICE tourism, Energy, Foreign direct investment
- Frequency: Semiannual
- Founded: 4 September 2009
- First issue: 30 October 2016
- Country: United Kingdom
- Based in: London, UK, with an EU office in Prague and an editorial office in Malta
- Language: English
- Website: https://www.sustaineurope.com
- ISSN: 2634-2510

Sustain Europe is a semiannual magazine and website focused on sustainability across travel and meetings, business, energy, and foreign direct investment in a European context. The magazine publishes long-form features, interviews and destination reports and has collaborated as a media partner with European conferences and city initiatives.

== Coverage and activities ==
The magazine covers EU- and city-level initiatives in sustainable tourism, green meetings, climate policy, renewable energy, and urban resilience. It is listed as a media partner on the European Urban Resilience Forum (EURESFO), organised by ICLEI Europe in collaboration with the European Environment Agency, and has been listed as a media/supporting partner for events including the UN Global Compact Network UK Annual Summit, Economist Impact’s Sustainability Week, and selected Reuters Events sustainability programmes.

Sustain Europe has also been cited or linked by international NGOs and academic institutions. WWF’s European Policy Office hosts a Spring/Summer feature from the magazine as a downloadable PDF; Stanford University’s Atmosphere/Energy Program hosts a PDF of the magazine’s interview with Professor Mark Z. Jacobson; and an HEC Paris executive-education report on smart cities includes a link to the magazine’s website (p. 113). A Cambridge University Press volume on business school leadership cites a Sustain Europe article in its references. A Wilfrid Laurier University capstone project for the City of Cambridge (Ontario, Canada) cites the magazine in its case material; university repositories also reference Sustain Europe articles in bibliographies and footnotes, including examples from the University of North Carolina and the University of Kent.

City and destination bodies have referenced the magazine in official documentation. For example, Dubrovnik’s GSTC Destination Assessment cites a Sustain Europe feature in its references. The Council of Europe’s “Report on Green Public Administration” cites a Sustain Europe article in its guidance section (footnote 50, p. 25).

The magazine’s destination reporting has included coverage of Monaco’s “Green is the New Glam” campaign at the time of its launch by the Tourist and Convention Authority; the article presented Monaco’s sustainability positioning in a factual, news-style format.

Tourism and meetings organisations have highlighted collaborations with or coverage by the magazine; for example, the Poland Convention Bureau reported a cover feature and linked to the publication in official communications, This is Athens & Partners hosts a press/media page presenting a Sustain Europe article about Athens’ sustainability positioning, and Leipzig Tourismus und Marketing’s press portal features a notice linking to a Sustain Europe article.

== Format and distribution ==
Sustain Europe publishes two print issues per year alongside regularly updated online articles. The print edition is produced on 100% recycled silk paper. Digital access is available via the magazine’s website and a mobile app. The website and online edition are hosted on servers powered by 100% renewable energy.

== See also ==
- Sustainable tourism
- Ecotourism
- Sustainable event management
- Green conventions
- Sustainable Development Goals
- Sustainable business
- European Green Deal
