= European Environmental Press =

The European Environmental Press (EEP) is a Europe-wide association of over a dozen environmental magazines with a combined circulation of 800,000. Each member is considered to be the leader in their country and is committed to building links between 400,000 environmental professionals across Europe in both the public and private sectors. The EEP brings together the leading national business-to-business magazines as an expert network for the dissemination of high-quality environmental information throughout Europe. The target market for EEP is highly educated individuals. It deals with various environmental issues, including water supply, waste management, recycling, remediation of contaminated land, air pollution, noise, energy, and tracking technologies, as well as environmental administration. The magazine is highly technologically optimistic and has focused on many technological solutions to environmental problems.

The European Environmental Press presents various companies with awards that relate to creating efficient solutions to environmental problems as well as to efforts to reduce pollution and contribute to bettering the environment. They do this in association with Pollutec, a French trade-show company that is endorsed by the European Network of Environmental Professionals (EFAP). Applications are open to everyone, and once submitted, a committee reviews them. From the pool of applicants, the committee nominates ten individuals as potential winners. Subsequently, the committee selects the final three winners from among the nominated candidates. These winners are awarded gold, silver, and bronze medals, respectively. The gold winners receive spreads in the EEP magazines, along with the opportunity to present their projects at various conferences across Europe, the most important one being Pollutec. Being nominated but not winning can also be beneficial, as nominated applicants are often cited in the magazine.

Examples of Companies and Countries Winning the EEP Award
Company	Country	Year
Lenzing Group	Austria	2011
Oilguard	Switzerland	2011
Nonox	Denmark	2009
Nanovis	Switzerland	2007
Yara	Norway	2007
Umicore Batteries	Belgium and Germany	2004
Interline Resources Corp	Spain and USA	2004

== China and the European Environmental Press ==
The Guardian and the EEP collaborated in May 2010 to recognize China's efforts at reducing pollution and taking steps towards a more sustainable future. This was also a journalism event, honoring journalists who were doing new and thorough investigations of the country's environment.

Name	Title	Award
Meng Dengke	Experts, lobbyists or businessmen? Incinerator supporters, Who do you speak for?	Best investigative report
Lu Zhenhua	Questions for the Inland Three-Gorges: An investigation of 120 billion yuan wind power investment in Jiuquan.	Most influential story
Yang Chuanmin	Chemical giants loom over Three Gorges	In-depth journalism award

Ekoloji Magazin from Turkey used to be published in the EEP often during the early 2000s, as well as Spanish TIASA - Tecno Ambiente

== See also ==
- Association of Environmental Professionals
- Conservation biology
- Conservation ethic
- Conservation movement
- Ecology
- Ecology movement
- Environmentalism
- Environmental movement
- Environmental protection
- Habitat conservation
- Natural environment
- Natural capital
- Natural resource
- Renewable resource
- Sustainable development
- Sustainability
