= Anil Agarwal (environmentalist) =

Indian journalist and environmentalist

Anil Kumar Agarwal
- Born: 23 November 1947
- Died: 2 January 2002 (aged 54)
- Education: IIT Kanpur
- Occupation: Environmentalist
- Awards: Padma Shri (1986); Padma Bhushan (2002)

Anil Kumar Agarwal (23 November 1947 – 2 January 2002) was an Indian environmentalist, trained as a mechanical engineer at IIT Kanpur, worked as a science correspondent for the Hindustan Times. He was the founder of the Centre for Science and Environment, a Delhi-based research institute currently led by Sunita Narain.

In 1987, the United Nations Environment Programme elected him to its Global 500 Roll of Honour for his work in the national and international arena. The Indian Government also honoured him with Padma Shri (1986) and Padma Bhushan (2002) for his work in environment and development. He authored more than 20 books and wrote numerous articles which were published in national and international journals too.

== Death ==
Anil Agarwal, died on 2 January 2002, at the age of 54. He died in Dehra Dun, India, following a long battle against cancer.
