= Lists of environmental publications =

This is a list of all environmental publication lists.

- List of environmental books
  - List of Australian environmental books
  - List of books about energy issues
  - List of climate change books
- List of environmental journals
  - List of botany journals
  - List of entomology journals
  - List of environmental social science journals
  - List of forestry journals
  - List of ornithology journals
  - List of planning journals
  - List of scholarly journals in environmental economics
  - List of scientific journals in biology
  - List of scientific journals in chemistry
  - List of scientific journals in earth and atmospheric sciences
  - List of scientific journals in physics
  - List of scientific journals
- List of environmental periodicals
- List of wildlife magazines
- List of environmental agreements
- List of environmental reports
- List of environmental websites

== See also ==
- Environment
- Environmental Media Services (EMS)
- List of environmental issues
- List of environmental lawsuits
