= Eco-efficiency =

Topic relating to sustainability science

Eco-efficiency refers to the delivery of goods and services to meet human needs and improve quality of life while progressively reducing their environmental impacts of goods and resource intensity during their life-cycle. Together with consistency and eco-sufficiency, it is well-established in sustainability science as a fundamental sustainability strategy.

== Terminology ==
As countries and regions around the world began to develop, it slowly became evident that industrialization and economic growth come hand in hand with environmental degradation. "Eco-efficiency" has been proposed as one of the main tools to promote a transformation from unsustainable development to one of sustainable development. It is based on the concept of creating more goods and services while using fewer resources and creating less waste and pollution. "It is measured as the ratio between the (added) value of what has been produced (e.g. GDP) and the (added) environment impacts of the product or service (e.g. CO_{2} emissions)." The term was coined by the World Business Council for Sustainable Development (WBCSD) in its 1992 publication "Changing Course". At the 1992 Earth Summit, eco-efficiency was endorsed as a new business concept and means for companies to implement Agenda 21 in the private sector. The term has now become synonymous with a management philosophy geared towards sustainability, combining ecological and economic efficiency.

== History ==
Although eco-efficiency is a rather new method, the idea is not. In the early 1970s Paul R. Ehrlich and John Holdren developed the lettering formula I = PAT to describe the impact of human activity on the environment. Furthermore, the concept of eco-efficiency was first described by McIntyre and Thornton in 1978, but it wasn't until 1992, when the term was formally coined and widely publicized by Stephan Schmidheiny in Changing Course. Schmidheiny set out "to change the perception of industry as being part of the problem of environmental degradation to the reality of its becoming part - a key part - of the solution for sustainability and global development". The major drivers in the early phase of eco-efficiency's development were the "forward-looking managers and thinkers in 3M and Dow". It was their involvement which catapulted eco-efficiency into development. The results of the WBCSD's work creating the "linkage between environmental performance and the bottom line was published in 1997 in its report Environmental Performance and Shareholder Value".

== Methods ==
According to the WBCSD definition, eco-efficiency is achieved through the delivery of "competitively priced goods and services that satisfy human needs and bring quality of life while progressively reducing environmental impacts of goods and resource intensity throughout the entire life-cycle to a level at least in line with the Earth's estimated carrying capacity". It works by implementing 4 main types of ratios.

"The first two are environmental productivity and its inverse, environmental intensity of production, referring to the realm of production. The second pair, environmental improvement cost and its inverse, environmental cost-effectiveness, are defined from an environmental improvements measures point-of-view."

The ratios may be applied to any unit comprising economic activities because such activities always relate to cost and value, "and having some physical substrate, always influence the environment." Furthermore, there are two different levels upon which to orchestrate the ratios: micro and macro. There are three different methods to determine eco-efficiency at the micro-level. First, incremental eco-efficiency, which "specifies the effects of the total value of a product system or sector and its total concomitant environmental effects." Second, an analysis method nicknamed win-win, which "gives a comparison between a historical reference situation and potentially new situations based on the use of new technologies." The win-win micro-method is limited because it cannot give a concrete answer on the question of whether it improves overall environmental performance. And the third is difference eco-efficiency, which is similar to the win-win variant, but removes all irrelevant alternatives to heighten potential for optimal technologies while comparing two alternatives. Now the macro-level is much less defined and has shown less accurate results. However, "the ultimate aim of eco-efficiency analysis is to help move micro-level decision making into macro-level optimality." The main goal in years to come is to create headline indicators to carry out macro-level analysis at a country/world scale.

There are two life-cycle assessment (LCA)–based calculation systems on eco-efficiency: the analysis method of BASF, and the method of the eco-costs value ratio of the Delft University of Technology.

== Uses ==
The reduction in ecological impacts translates into an increase in resource productivity, which in turn can create a competitive advantage. According to the WBCSD, critical aspects of eco-efficiency are:

- A reduction in the material intensity of goods or services;
- A reduction in the energy intensity of goods or services;
- Reduced dispersion of toxic materials;
- Improved recyclability;
- Maximum use of renewable resources;
- Greater durability of products;
- Increased service intensity of goods and services.

Strategies that have been linked to eco-efficiency include "Factor 4" and "Factor 10", which call for specific reductions in resource use, "natural capitalism", which incorporates eco-efficiency as part of a broader strategy, and the "cradle-to-cradle" movement, which claims to go beyond eco-efficiency in abolishing the very idea of waste. According to Boulanger, all versions of eco-efficiency share four key characteristics:

- Confidence in technological innovation as the main solution to un-sustainability;
- Reliance on business as the principal actor of transformation. The emphasis is on firms designing new products, shifting to new production processes, and investing in R&D, etc., more than on the retailer or the consumer, let alone the citizen.
- Trust in markets (if they are functioning well);
- "Growthphilia": the idea that there is nothing wrong with growth as such.

The view that improvements in eco-efficiency are sufficient for achieving sustainability has been challenged by Huesemann and Huesemann, who demonstrate using extensive historical evidence that increases in technological efficiency have not reduced overall resource use and pollution. Moreover, with "cradle-to-cradle", growth is conducive to sustainability per se. This broader concept is called Sustainable Production and Consumption (SPC). "This concept involves changes in production and consumption patterns that lead to sustainable use of natural resources;" business has taken a key role in accelerating the use of this concept because businesses both consume and produce. Eco-efficiency is routinely a concept used because it combines performance along two of the three axes of sustainable development, making it easier for academics and leading thinkers to tease out the associated social issues.

=== Examples ===
Furthermore, eco-efficiency can adapt and flex to be fit different sizes of companies, while also maintaining relevance with the larger scale of government and national policies. For example, larger national players such as the Organisation for Economic Co-operation and Development (OECD 2002), European Commission (EU 2005), European Environment Agency (EEA) and the National Round Table on the Environment and the Economy (NRTEE) have all recognized that eco-efficiency is a practical approach that businesses should adopt in setting and achieving their environmental performance objectives. It has been proven to heighten market values for firms, serve as an effective management tool for governments, benefit civil society, and increase quality of life. "It does this by changing industrial processes, creating new products and changing and influencing markets with new ideas and with new rules." More people aim to get more value for their money in the market, while also enjoying a better environment. Firms implementing eco-efficiency to boost their value include mining companies, which integrate automated load analysis technologies, including onboard weighing systems, IoT, and machine learning, into mining and construction operations to significantly enhance eco-efficiency by optimizing resource allocation, reducing fuel consumption, and minimizing environmental impacts.

Eco-efficiency is also implemented in more non-traditional ways, such as the integration of environmental criteria into the credit approval process; looking at "eco-integrated economic risks of a customer". Besides, it plays a growing role where "eco-efficient choices are always preferred," especially in service sectors such as tourism (see ecotourism).

== See also ==
- Eco-costs value ratio
- Eco-innovation
- Industrial ecology
- Material input per service unit
- Source reduction
- Sustainability measurement
- Sustainable design
- Sustainable development
