= Anke Weidenkaff =

German-Swiss chemical scientist

- Born: 27 December 1966 (age 59); Hanover, Germany
- Occupations: Chemist; material scientist

Academic background
- Education: University of Hamburg; ETH Zurich; University of Augsburg

Academic work
- Discipline: Chemistry and material engineering
- Sub-discipline: Materials science; resource strategies
- Institutions: Technische Universität Darmstadt (since 2018– ); Swiss Federal Laboratories for Materials Science and Technology (Empa); University of Bern; University of Stuttgart; Fraunhofer Research Institution for Materials Recycling and Resource Strategies (IWKS)

Anke Weidenkaff (December 27, 1966 in Hanover, Germany) is a German-Swiss chemist and materials scientist. Since 2018, she has been head of the Materials & Resources Group at the Faculty of Materials Science at Technical University Darmstadt.

== Biography ==
Weidenkaff was born in Hanover, Germany, and studied chemistry at the University of Hamburg. She received her PhD in 2000 from ETH Zurich in the Department of Chemistry. In 2006, she received the Venia Legendi for Solid State Chemistry and Materials Science from the University of Augsburg and became section head at the Swiss Federal Laboratories for Materials Science and Technology (Empa) and associated professor at the University of Bern. From 2013 to 2018, she was director of the Institute of Materials Science at the University of Stuttgart, where she chaired the Department of Chemical Materials Synthesis. Weidenkaff was director of Fraunhofer Research Institution for Materials Recycling and Resource Strategies, a research institute of the Fraunhofer Society, from 2018 until 2024. Weidenkaff is professor at Technical University Darmstadt in the field of material science and resource management.

From 2016 to 2019, she was president of the European Thermoelectric Society (ETS), of which she had been a board member since 2007. She is an elected member of the European Materials Research Society's (E-MRS) Executive Committee and was chair of the 2019 E-MRS Spring Meeting. Weidenkaff was a member of the German Advisory Council on Global Change (WBGU) from 2020 to 2024. She was elected as a member to the German National Academy of Sciences Leopoldina and the German Academy of Science and Engineering in 2023.

== Research ==
Weidenkaff's main areas of research and expertise are materials science and resource strategies, including the development, synthesis chemistry, and characterization of substitute materials for energy conversion and storage. Building on scientific knowledge of solid-state chemistry, her current work focuses on materials science and specifically the development of regenerative, sustainable materials and next-generation process technologies for fast and efficiently closed materials cycles. Anke Weidenkaff and her team are currently working on technologies for the production of (green) hydrogen including photoelectrochemical water splitting, the production of carbon nanotubes using microwave plasma synthesis for carbon storage, and sustainable perovskite materials. She is also involved in the development of thermoelectrics, electroceramics and ceramic membranes. She conducts research on sustainable materials and recycling technologies for batteries and fuel cells. Another focus of her work is "Green ICT", the development of sustainable materials and processes for information and communication technology.

== International recognition and activities ==
- 2008: Visiting professor, Case Western Reserve University (CWRU) and visiting scientist NASA Glenn Research Centre, Cleveland, USA
- 2011: Kavli Foundation Lectureship prize
- 2012 - 2013: Editor in Chief and Member of the Editorial Board of “Energy Quarterly”; Member of the Advisory Board of the MRS Book Series on Energy and Sustainability
- 2015 - 2017: Member of the Board of Directors, Materials Research Society (MRS)
- 2016 - 2019: President of the European Thermoelectric Society (ETS)
- 2020 - 2024: Member of the German Advisory Council on Global Change (WBGU)
- 2022: Karl W. Böer Renewable Energy Mid-Career Award
- since 2023: Member of the German National Academy of Sciences Leopoldina
- since 2023: Member of the Acatech, the German National Academy of Science and Engineering.
