= Sufficiency =

Sufficiency may refer to:

- Logical sufficiency; see necessary and sufficient conditions
- sufficiency (statistics), sufficiency in statistical inference
- The sufficiency of Scripture, a Christian doctrine

See also

- Self-sufficiency
- Eco-sufficiency
- Sufficiency of disclosure, a patent law requirement
