= Global Climate Network =

The Global Climate Network (GCN) is an alliance of influential think tanks and research institutes in different countries that collaborate on research into climate change policy and whose stated aim is to help address the political blockages to ambitious action to tackle global warming.

The network has members in nine countries worldwide, including the United States, China, India, UK, Australia, Brazil, Norway, South Africa and Nigeria. Its secretariat is housed at the Institute for Public Policy Research in London, UK. GCN members are engaged jointly in a programme of research projects, the results of which each member feeds into policy making at the domestic and international levels.

Collectively, members of the Global Climate Network are committed to a vision of a prosperous and secure world in which greenhouse gas emissions have been reduced to a level that is no longer harmful to the climate system. Working together, the Network construct a narrative for action on climate change that is concerned with human and economic progress as well as environmental wellbeing.

The network's patrons are Dr Rajendra Pachauri, chair of the Intergovernmental Panel on Climate Change and director-general of the Energy and Resources Institute in India; John Podesta, former Chief of Staff to President Bill Clinton and director of Center for American Progress, and Lord Christopher Patten of Barnes, former European Commissioner for External Affairs.

== History ==
The Global Climate Network was launched at the 14th Conference of the Parties to the UN Framework Convention on Climate Change in Poznań, 2008. Its first paper, Closing the Mitigation Gap, which was released to coincide with the Network's launch, identified the amount of carbon dioxide that would still need to be reduced once developed or Annex 1 country pledges had been achieved.

Breaking Through technology: Overcoming the Barriers to the Development and Wide Deployment of Low-Carbon Technology, its second paper, published in July 2009, focussed on the low-carbon technology needs of eight member countries and how these could be met, or partly met, through government policies.

In October 2009, the work of the Global Climate Network was acknowledged by the UK current affairs magazine Prospect who named the Institute for Public Policy Research the UK's Green Think Tank of the Year at their annual award ceremony, in part because of its involvement in the global alliance. Judges, including Rohan Silva, senior adviser to UK Prime Minister David Cameron, Baroness Falkner and David Walker, former managing director of the UK's audit commission, gave special mention in their citation to the GCN, calling the initiative 'ground-breaking' and 'unique'.

Also in October 2009, the GCN facilitated a high-level meeting of environment ministers and executive directors of environmental protection agencies from a number of countries, including the US, Brazil, Australia, Korea and Indonesia, at Windsor Castle in the UK. The 'Windsor dialogue' was presided over by Lord Chris Smith, Chairman of the Environment Agency and concluded with agreement that greater resources are needed to ensure comprehensive and accurate reporting of greenhouse gas emissions data in developing countries.

At the 15th Conference of the Parties in Copenhagen, held in December 2009, the GCN published a third discussion paper, Low Carbon jobs in an Interconnected world, analysing the potential employment opportunities in clean energy sectors in eight countries. The study - which featured the headline '20 million opportunities in a global low-carbon economy' - argued that the bolder government policies to promote rapid growth in climate-friendly innovations and industries are, the higher the likelihood of new job creation on a significant scale. The report was reissued with additional analysis from Brazil in March 2010.

In October 2010, the Global Climate Network will release a major new report on clean energy finance in the developing world, which will identify the capital needs of developing countries and potential solutions for leveraging private sector investment in clean energy industries. A further study on 'low carbon industrial strategy' will be published in January 2011.

== Members ==
The founding and current members of the Global Climate Network are:

- Institute for Public Policy Research, UK;
- Center for American Progress, US
- The Energy and Resources Institute, India
- The International Centre for Energy, Environment and Development, Nigeria
- The Climate Institute, Australia
- Research Centre for Sustainable Development at the Chinese Academy of Social Sciences, China
- Bellona Foundation, Norway
- IMBEWU Sustainability Legal Specialists Pty Ltd, South Africa

The GCN also has a growing number of associate members who collaborate on specific research and advocacy projects. These include: Wuppertal Institute for Climate, Environment and Energy in Germany; Vitae Civilis in Brazil; and the Institute of Policy Analysis and Research in Rwanda.

IPPR in London houses the Global CLimate Network's secretariat.

== Key publications ==
The Global Climate Network publishes research that seeks to highlight the barriers and opportunities in the transition to a global low carbon economy. Recent reports have focused on clean energy jobs, barriers to low-carbon technology development and deployment, and the shortfall in carbon dioxide mitigation between what developed countries have pledged and what the scientific evidence on climate change suggests is needed.

Low Carbon Jobs in an Interconnected World - This report identifies the employment opportunities on offer in nine of the world's leading economies if their governments enact ambitious policies to stimulate growth in clean energy sectors.

Breaking through on Technology - this report analyses the barriers preventing the development and widescale diffusion of low-carbon technologies in eight member countries. Among its recommendations, it calls for technology to be placed ‘front and centre’ of the international negotiations on climate change and for the establishment of a network of global and regional innovation hubs to spearhead collaborative low-carbon technological development - a proposal that was later also called for by the World Economic Forum's Task force on low-carbon prosperity.

Closing the Mitigation Gap - a commissioned paper that highlights the shortcomings of developed countries proposals for reducing greenhouse gas emissions and the ‘mitigation gap’ which could open up and undermine the credibility of a post-2012 regime to prevent climate change.
