= Co2online =

co2online gemeinnützige Beratungsgesellschaft mbH (written as co2online) was founded in Berlin in 2003 by Johannes Hengstenberg. It aims to motivate private households to reduce their final energy consumption and CO_{2} emissions through a range of advisory services and campaigns. The company is largely financed by German federal ministries.

== Organisation ==
Around 50 employees work at the company's headquarters in Berlin-Schöneberg. The managing director is Tanja Loitz. In 2022, the company was financed primarily by grants and contracts from the Federal Ministry of Economics, other federal ministries and the Federal Environment Agency.

== Consulting and campaigns ==
The non-profit company conducts regional, Germany-wide and, in some cases, Europe-wide consultations and various campaigns on the topic of energy saving. The focus is on online consulting to show private households how they can save energy, reduce energy costs and protect the climate at the same time. The topics range from saving electricity in everyday life to the thermal modernisation of buildings. With the help of interactive energy-saving guides and the Energiesparkonto (energy-saving account), consumers can find out to what extent their energy consumption is harmful to the environment and what individual steps they can take to save energy. In addition to websites and online guides, the 'data-based communication' tools include a newsletter sent to around 150,000 users and dedicated databases. According to its own figures, co2online has provided over 23.4 million online consultations to date (as of 15 September 2025)

Evaluations have identified positive effects of using the advice service on CO2 emissions as well as on turnover and employment in the crafts trade and industry. Since 2021, an annual impact report has presented the results of an 'impact assessment' developed in collaboration with the Institute for Energy and Environmental Research Heidelberg, the Institute for Ecological Economy Research, the Öko-Institut and the Wuppertal Institute for Climate, Environment and Energy. In 2022, the company reported 5.1 million visits to its websites and said its advice had helped prevent 4.8 million tonnes of CO2 emissions.

Together with the Deutscher Mieterbund (German Tenants' Association), the company publishes the nationwide Heizspiegel (Heating breakdown) every year. The first of these data analyses on heating costs in residential buildings was published in 2005. In addition to the nationwide heating index, municipal heating indices were also published.

In 2014, co2online published the nationwide electricity index for Germany for the first time in collaboration with the Federal Ministry for the Environment and other consumer organisations, research institutions, energy agencies and trade associations. Since then, a total of seven data analyses on electricity consumption in private households have been published, most recently in 2025. To this end, over 360,000 electricity consumption data points from across Germany were evaluated in order to determine nationally valid comparative values.

In 2023, co2online published its first hot water consumption index. This publishes current data on hot water consumption and savings potential in private households.

Since 2009, co2online has been running an annual competition for schools called Energiesparmeister (Energy Saving Champion), which is aimed at pupils, teachers and educators. The competition recognises the best climate protection projects in schools in Germany. In 2023, applications were received from 418 schools. In 15 years, a total of 3,686 applications were received and 222 schools were awarded prizes.

== Awards ==
co2online won the European Commission's Sustainable Energy Europe Award in 2007 in the Awareness category for its Klima sucht Schutz (Climate Seeks Protection) campaign and in 2015 in the Energy Efficiency category for its consumer app ecoGator. The organisation received the CleanTech Media Award in the Sustainability category in 2008. The co2online project Heizspiegel was presented by the International Energy Agency (IEA) in 2009 as an innovative activity from Germany in an international study featuring 30 examples from around the world. As an official project of the UN Decade 'Education for Sustainable Development', an initiative of UNESCO, the co2online school competition 'Energy Saving Champion' has been able to use this title since 2009. co2online received the Wirkt-Siegel (Seal of effectiveness) from Phineo in 2023.

== Criticism ==
In 2013, criticism was levelled at the Stromsparinitiative (electricity saving initiative) campaign organised by co2online, which had been initiated by the then Federal Environment Minister Peter Altmaier (CDU). The SPIEGEL reported on the Federal Government's responses to a short question from the Bundestag parliamentary group of the Green Party. According to this, costs of 600,000 euros were incurred for the little-used internet platform. In a minor interpellation in May 2005, criticism was levelled at co2online's Klima sucht Schutz campaign and the Heiz-Energiecheck (Heating energy check). The sender was the CDU/CSU parliamentary group in the Bundestag. According to a report by the German Energy Agency, criticism was levelled at the allocation procedure for subsidies and the 'necessity, effectiveness and accuracy' of the heating energy check. Various media outlets had already reported on this in February. The Federal Ministry for the Environment, headed at the time by Jürgen Trittin (Alliance 90/The Greens), spoke in a press release of "Kritik an Online-Energieberatung ohne Hand und Fuß"(Criticism of online energy advice that is completely unfounded).
