= Wolfgang Sachs =

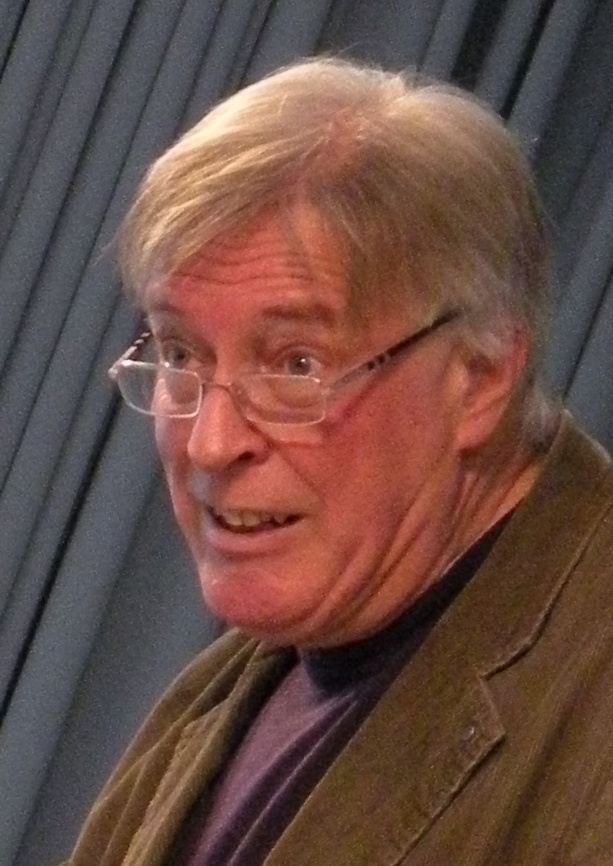
- Born: 25 November 1946 (age 79); Munich
- Education: University of California, Berkeley
- Known for: Environmental studies
- Scientific career
- Fields: Sociology, Catholic theology, environment
- Workplaces: Wuppertal Institute for Climate, Environment and Energy

Wolfgang Sachs (German: [zaks]; born 25 November 1946) is a researcher, writer and university teacher in the field of environment, development, and globalization.

== Biography ==
Sachs studied sociology and Catholic theology in Munich, Tübingen and Berkeley. He holds a master's degree in sociology (1971), a master's degree in theology (1972) and a PhD in social sciences (1975).

After a period (1975–1984) as assistant professor at Technische Universität Berlin he joined the Society for International Development in Rome as a co-editor of the journal Development. 1987–1990 he was visiting professor at Pennsylvania State University and 1990–1993 fellow at the Institute for Advanced Study in the Humanities in Essen.

In 1992 he edited and co-authored the volume The Development Dictionary: A Guide to Knowledge as Power (London: Zed Books), by now a 'classic' in (Post-)Development Studies, which has been translated into a dozen languages. A new edition, including a new preface, was published in 2010.

Since 1993 Sachs has worked at the Wuppertal Institute for Climate, Environment and Energy, since 2009 as head of the Berlin Office. He served also as chairman of Greenpeace Germany from 1993 to 2001, and as a lead author in the Intergovernmental Panel on Climate Change from 1999 to 2001. On behalf of the Heinrich Böll Foundation, he chaired two international civil society expert panels, one to draft a memorandum for the World Summit on Sustainable Development in Johannesburg in 2002 (The Jo'burg Memo) and the other (also on behalf of Misereor) to carry out a Dialogue / Report on multilateral trade rules for sustainable markets in agriculture (Slow Trade – Sound Farming, 2007). He is also Chairman of the Scientific Advisory Committee of the annual fair "Terra Futura" in Florence, Italy a Curator of the annual "Toblach Talks" in Toblach, Italy, and a co-organizer of the annual "Spiekeroog Climate Talks" on the island of Spiekeroog, Germany. Sachs is a member of the Scientific Advisory Board of Association for the Taxation of Financial Transactions and for Citizens' Action.

Furthermore, he is the principal author of Fair Future: Resource Conflicts, Security and Global Justice and Sustainable Germany in a Globalized World, both major studies produced by the Wuppertal Institute. Sachs is also a member of the Club of Rome, a lecturer at Schumacher College and an honorary professor at the University of Kassel, Germany.

== Ideas ==
In 1993, Wolfgang Sachs summarised sufficiency with "four Ds":

- Decelerate (going slower and less far);
- De-clutter (accumulate fewer things);
- Decentralize (choosing local and regional);
- Decommercialization (leaving less room for the market in your life).

== Selected publications ==
- Sachs, Wolfgang; Zukunftsfähiges Deutschland in einer globalisierten Welt (Sustainable Germany in a Gobalized World), published by Brot für die Welt, eed and BUND – Frankfurt/Main: Fischer, 2008 (main author).
- Sachs, Wolfgang; Climate Change and Human Rights. In: Development, 51 (2008), 332–337.
- Sachs, Wolfgang & Santarius, Tilman et al.; Slow Trade – Sound Farming. A Multilateral Framework for Sustainable Markets in Agriculture, – Berlin: Heinrich Böll Foundation & Misereor, 2007. Also available in Spanish, French, Arabic, Czech.
- Sachs, Wolfgang & Santarius, Tilman et al.; Fair Future. Resource Conflicts, Security, and Global Justice. – London: Zed Books, 2007. Also available in German, Italian, Spanish.
- Sachs, Wolfgang; Environment and Human Rights. – Wuppertal: Wuppertal Institut für Klima, Umwelt, Energie, 2003.
- Sachs, Wolfgang; Fair Wealth: Eight Shifts towards a Light Economy. In: Manzini, Ezio (ed.): Sustainable Everyday: Scenarios of Urban Life. – Milan: Edizioni Ambiente, 2003, 41–44.
- Sachs, Wolfgang (ed.); The Jo'burg Memo: Fairness in a Fragile World. Memorandum for the World Summit on Sustainable Development. – Berlin: Heinrich Böll Foundation, 2002. – (World Summit papers). Also available in German, Italian, Spanish, Portuguese, Russian, Arabic, French, Turkish, Thai, Indonesian, Hindi, Chinese, Vietnamese, Korean, Khmer, Urdu.
- Sachs, Wolfgang; Development and Global Environmental Change. In: Timmerman, Peter (ed.): Encyclopedia of Global Environmental Change : volume 5. – Chichester [u.a.]: Wiley, 2002, 150–162.
- Sachs, Wolfgang; Globalization and Sustainability : an essay. – Berlin : Heinrich Böll Foundation, 2000. – (World Summit paper; 6) – also in German, Spanish, Italian, Portuguese.
- Sachs, Wolfgang; Being and buying: the Power of Limits – an Inquiry into new Models of Wealth. In: New perspectives quarterly, 17 (2000), 4, 14–26.
- Sachs, Wolfgang; Planet Dialectics: Explorations in Environment and Development. – London [u.a.] : Zed Books [u.a.], 1999. Also available in German and Japanese.
- Sachs, Wolfgang; Rich in Things, Poor in Time: Poverty of Time Degrades the Wealth of Goods. In: Resurgence, 1999, 196, 14–18.
- Sachs, Wolfgang; Loske, Reinhard & Linz, Manfred; Greening the North: A Post-industrial Blueprint for Ecology and Equity. – London [u.a.]: Zed Books, 1998. Also available in German, Italian and Japanese.
- Sachs, Wolfgang; Speed limits. In: Millar, Jeremy (ed.): Speed: Visions of an Accelerated Age. – London: The Photographers' Gallery, 1996, 123–130.
- Sachs, Wolfgang; Sustainable Development. In: Redclift, Michael (ed.): The International Handbook of Environmental Sociology. – Cheltenham [u.a.] : Elgar, 1997, 71–82.
- Sachs, Wolfgang (ed.); Global Ecology : A new Arena of Political Conflict. – London [u.a.] : Zed Books [u.a.], 1993. Also available in German.
- Sachs, Wolfgang (ed.); The Development Dictionary: A Guide to Knowledge as Power. – London [u.a.]: Zed Books [u.a.], 1992. Available editions and translations: Spanish, South African, Indonesian, Indian, Japanese, Thai, Italian, Persian, Portuguese, Mexican, Serbian, French.
- Sachs, Wolfgang: For Love of the Automobile: Looking Back into the History of Our Desires. – Berkeley, Calif.: Univ. of California Press, 1992. Also published in German and Japanese.

== See also ==
- Eco-sufficiency
