= Material input per unit of service =

Economic concept

The Material input per unit of service (MIPS) is an economic concept, originally developed at the Wuppertal Institute, Germany in the 1990s. The MIPS concept can be used to measure eco-efficiency of a product or service and applied in all scales from a single product to complex systems. The calculation takes into account materials required to produce a product or service. The total material input (MI) is divided by the number of service units (S). For example, in case of a passenger car, the number of service units is the total number of passenger kilometres during the whole life span of the vehicle. The lower the material input per kilometre, the more eco-efficient is the vehicle. The whole life-cycle of a product or service is measured when MIPS values are calculated. This allows comparisons of resource consumption of different solutions to produce the same service. When a single product is examined, the MIPS calculations reveal the magnitude of resource use along the life-cycle and help to focus efforts on the most significant phases to reduce environmental burden of the product.

== Increasing resource efficiency ==
There are two ways to reduce the material consumption per unit of service, the material input (MI) of the product can be reduced or amount of service units (S) can be increased. Material input in the production phase can be reduced by using less energy or raw materials. Also transport chains can be rationalized. In the use phase the material input per unit of service can be reduced when amount of service produced is increased. For instance in case of a newspaper the material input can be reduced by using recycled paper instead of primary. Material input per reader decreases when the same paper is shared with several persons. High quality products and availability of spares potentially increase the service life of the product. When the service life of a product is increased, the material consumption per unit of time decreases. Usually services like car sharing also help to reduce MIPS values since fewer products are needed to produce the service for greater number of people.

== Factor X concept ==
The Factor X concept was coined by Prof. Friedrich Schmidt-Bleek. The factor targets refer to dematerializing of our economies. The Factor Ten Club founded in 1994 and the Factor 10 Institute founded in 1997 support the dematerialization target. It has been proposed that material flows in the industrialized countries should be decreased by factor 10 to reach more sustainable level of material use. Aim of factor targets is to increase resource productivity and increase the wealth created from the resources. The factor concept can be applied on microeconomic and macroeconomic levels. For instance the Wuppertal Institute presents micro-level best practices related to Factor Four guideline.

== Natural resource categories ==
The MIPS method can be used to measure natural resource consumption in five categories, viz. abiotic and biotic resources, earth movements in agriculture and silviculture, water and air. Abiotic resources refer to non-renewable resources like minerals, fossil energy sources and soil excavations. Biotic resources refer to renewable resources like plant biomass. Earth movements include mechanical movements and erosion. Water includes surface, ground and deep ground water used by humans. Air is calculated when it is used in combustion processes or chemically or physically transformed. The concept of total material requirement (TMR) used in many cases used in macro-level statistics and it refers to sum of abiotic and biotic resources and erosion.

== Material intensity factors ==
The cornerstone of MIPS calculations are the material intensity factors. The Wuppertal Institute has the most extensive list of MI-factors. Factors are provided for a wide range of basic materials and energy. The factors indicate how many kilograms of natural resources in each of the five natural resource categories are used or transferred in the ecosystem to produce one kilogram of certain material or a unit of energy.

== Concept of ecological backpack ==
Ecological backpack is calculated by subtracting the net weight of the products from the total material input of it. The ecological backpack illustrates the hidden flows which cannot be seen in the final product. In many cases vast amount of resources are used or transferred in the developing world where the raw material production takes place. It is important to find tools to illustrate these mass movements since consumption of the products by large part takes place in the developed world. In many cases the weight of backpacks are multiple times heavier than the product itself.

== Scope and limitations of the MIPS method ==
The MIPS method measures the life-cycle wide material inputs required to produce a product or service. The MIPS method does not straightforwardly measure waste, pollution and other negative outputs produced by the human economy. However, all material inputs become outputs of the economy at some point, and when inputs are reduced also negative outputs like waste will decrease. MIPS provides a rough but easily understandable tool to measure overall volume and efficiency of resource use. Røpke 2001: 130 states: “As the number of pollution problems is very large, it is difficult to construct reasonable indicators for overall environmental impact from the output side. The focus on inputs is thus a way to avoid drowning in detail.” Since MIPS does not take into account for instance ecotoxicity of materials and processes it should be used together with other methods taking into account these issues.

== Criticism towards the MIPS concept ==
The most common criticism towards MIPS method is related to the fact that MIPS does not take into account ecotoxicity of materials. Schmidt-Bleek reminds us that also non-toxic material flows can affect the environment. The current climate issue and CO_{2} emissions show that also vast amounts of non-toxic materials may contribute to environmental problems.

Critiques have also noted that extensive material flows occur in natural processes. However, the pace on which humans transfer materials is so fast that the environment cannot keep up with it and reproduce itself.

== Conducted MIPS studies ==
MIPS-concept has been applied in multiple research projects, especially in Germany and Finland. The most extensive projects in Finland concerned transport sector and household consumption. FIN-MIPS Transport project studied the Finnish transport system both from passenger and goods transport perspective in 2003–2005 whereas the FIN-MIPS Household project examined material intensity of housing, mobility, foodstuffs, household goods, tourism, leisure and sport activities in Finland and on sample of 27 Finnish households.

== See also ==
- Carbon footprint
- Ecological footprint
