= Maja Göpel =

German political economist and university teacher

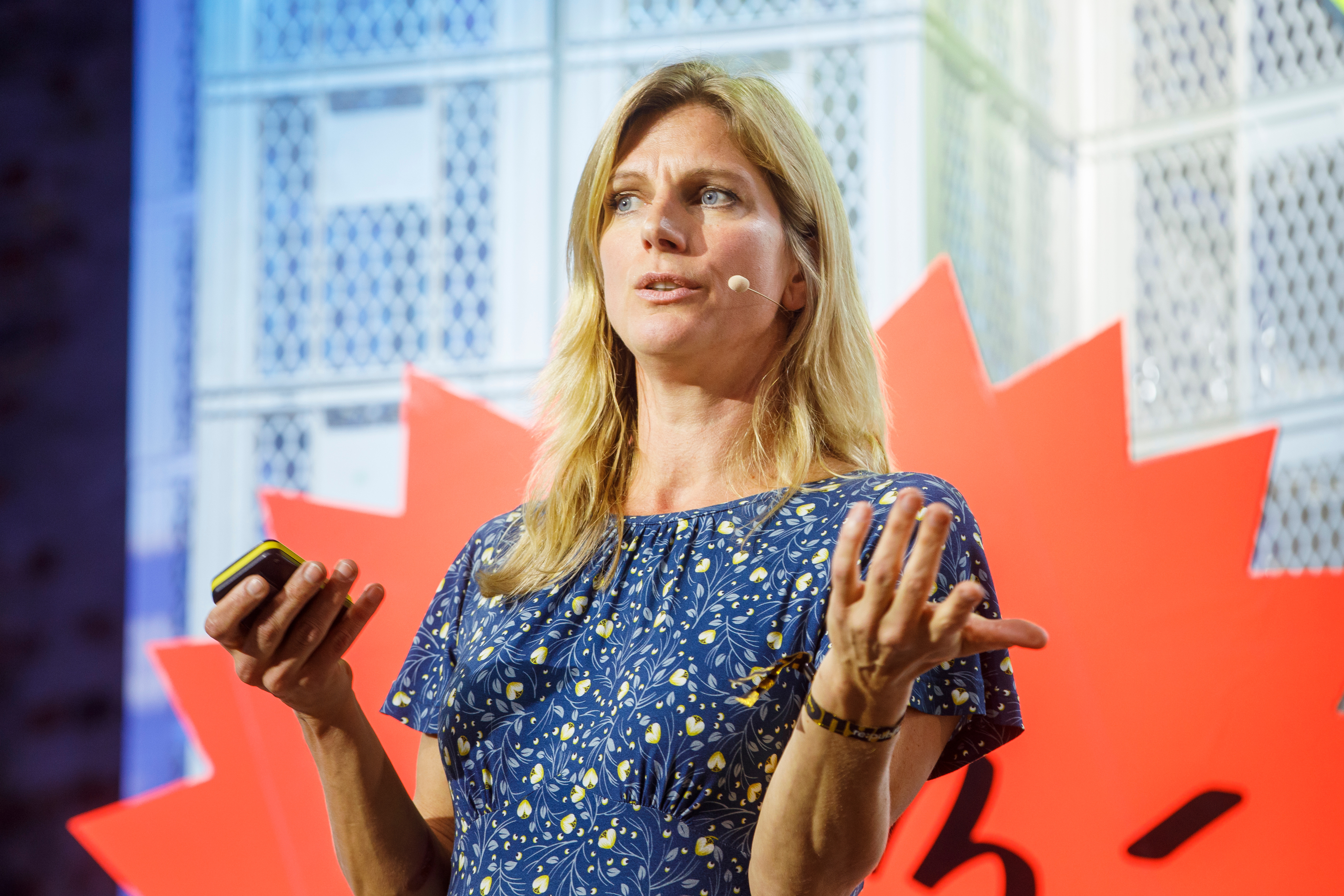
- Göpel in 2023 at re:publica
- Born: 27 June 1976 (age 50); Bielefeld, West Germany
- Education: University of Siegen; University of Hamburg; University of Kassel
- Occupations: Political economist, sustainability scientist
- Known for: Secretary General of the German Advisory Council on Global Change

Maja Göpel (born 27 June 1976) is a German political economist, transformation researcher, and sustainability scientist with a focus on transdisciplinarity. In 2019 she co-founded the Scientists for Future initiative. Göpel is an honorary professor at Leuphana University of Lüneburg.

== Early life and education ==
Göpel was born in Bielefeld; as daughter to a social scientist and a medical doctor. She received a diploma in media and communications from the University of Siegen in 2001 and her PhD in political economy from the University of Kassel in 2007. From 2003 to 2006, she had a PhD scholarship of the Stiftung der Deutschen Wirtschaft (fund of German industry body) and taught at the University of Hamburg. Her PhD thesis is about globalisation and world trade. She volunteered with the Bund für Umwelt und Naturschutz Deutschland (BUND) at this time.

== Career ==
From 2006 to 2012, Göpel helped start the World Future Council as Campaign Manager Climate Energy in Hamburg and as Director Future Justice of the Brussels office, working in EU and UN contexts. From 2013 to 2017, she served as head of the Berlin office of the Wuppertal Institute for Climate, Environment and Energy with a focus on sustainability transformations. In 2016, she published her book The Great Mindshift: How a New Economic Paradigm and Sustainability Transformations Go Hand in Hand that summarizes research on system transformations, political economy and change management with an emphasis on a change in paradigms, mindsets (mentality) and competencies with which humans shape technical, economic, and social institutions. From 2017 to 2020, she was Secretary General of the German Advisory Council on Global Change (WBGU), a body that advises the German government on shaping its policies towards sustainability. In 2019, she was appointed honorary professor at the Leuphana University of Lüneburg. Also in 2019, she co-founded the Scientists for Future initiative, which published a statement of thousands of scientists validating the claims of the Fridays for Future student protests. In February 2020, Göpel published a non-fiction book titled Unsere Welt neu denken. Eine Einladung (published in English as Rethinking our world: an invitation to rescue our future). In her book, Maja Göpel makes an abstract plea for more distributive justice and criticizes growth paradigms. The book was a commercial success and became number 3 on the German annual bestseller list 2020. From 2020 to 2021, she was Director of Research of The New Institute, founded in Hamburg in 2020. Her involvement lasted half a year (see "critics").

End of 2021, she became visiting professor at the College of Europe in Bruges.

It was announced that Göpel would publish her second book in spring 2022, titled "We can do things differently. Setting off into the world of tomorrow". But the book has been postponed until the beginning of September. Die Zeit had previously announced that parts of the book were co-written to an unknown extent by a co-author, which is un-named in the books (see "critics").

In July 2022 it was announced that Göpel would set up and head his own "Center for Social-Ecological Transformation" at the German Institute for Economic Research (DIW). The news was not received positively at DIW. The institute already has a "Securing the Future and Sustainability" department with Karsten Neuhoff for climate policy and Claudia Kemfert for economics. The question was whether resources would migrate to the new center. DIW and Göpel then canceled.

The Süddeutsche Zeitung learned that she was designing her own center instead. Located in Berlin, the center "Mission wertvoll" is scheduled to start work in 2023. Göpel wants to bring together science, politics and pioneers from business to give the attention to the opportunities for transformation towards a climate-friendly, sustainable economy. According to Süddeutsche the financing is available.

== Other activities ==
=== Corporate boards ===
- German Investment Corporation (DEG), Member of the Supervisory Board

=== Memberships ===
Göpel is, among others, a member of the Bioeconomy Council of the German Federal Government, the International Club of Rome, the World Future Council, the Balaton Group founded by Donella Meadows and Dennis Meadows in 1982, and the German Commission for UNESCO, as well as of the Board of Trustees of WWF Germany, the Board of Trustees of the Museum of Natural History Berlin, the advisory board of the Bartlett School of Environment, Energy and Resources (BSEER) at University College London and the advisory board of the ZOE Institute for Future-fit Economies.

=== Political activities ===
Göpel was nominated by the Alliance 90/The Greens as delegate to the Federal Convention for the purpose of electing the President of Germany in 2022.

== Awards ==
In 2019, Göpel received the Adam Smith Prize for market-based environmental policy. In 2020, she was awarded the Umwelt- und Nachhaltigkeitspreis (Environmental and Sustainability Award) from the Bundesdeutscher Arbeitskreis für Umweltbewusstes Management (B.A.U.M.). In 2021, she received three additional honors: the Erich Fromm Prize, the Theodor Heuss Prize and the Max Planck Society Science Communication Medal. The same year the Frankfurter Allgemeine Zeitung ranked her 17th among the 100 most influential German economists.

== Critics ==
In August 2022, Die Zeit reported that Göpels new book, as well as the 2020 bestseller, was co-authored by a ghostwriter, which is not mentioned in the book. The extent to which the ghostwriter Marcus Jauer wrote the books is not known. Ghostwriter journalist Marcus Jauer is not mentioned in any place in the books. According to Göpel, he did not want to be named.

Göpel was awarded prizes for her first book, most notably the Erich Fromm Prize. The RND asked in 2022: "Whether she would have gotten it if the title had said "with Marcus Jauer"?".

Die Zeit wrote that the think tank The New Institute in Hamburg hired Göpel as scientific director in autumn 2020, but soon feared for its reputation if the ghostwriting became public. The employment relationship ended in July 2021, formally based on Göpel's decision.

== Selected works ==
- Göpel, M., & Arhelger, M. (2010). How to Protect Future Generations' Rights in European Governance. In: Intergenerational Justice Review (1).
- Göpel, M. (2010). Formulating Future Just Policies: Applying the Delhi Sustainable Development Law Principles. In: Sustainability 2/6 2010, pp. 1694–1718, doi:10.3390/su2061694
- Göpel, M. (2011). The Tragedy of our Growth Saga. In: F. Hinterberger, E. Pirgmaier et al. (eds.): Growth in Transition. Earthscan, London, pp. 147–153, ISBN 978-1-84971-395-5.
- Göpel, M. (2011). Shared Responsibilities and Future Generations: Beyond the Dominant Concepts of Justice, in: Council of Europe (eds.), Towards a Europe of Shared Social Responsibilities: Challenges and Strategies. Trends in Social Cohesion, No. 23, Council of Europe Publishing, Strasbourg, pp. 135–155, http://www.coe.int/t/dg3/socialpolicies/socialcohesiondev/source/Trends/Trends_23_EN.pdf.
- Göpel, M. (2012). Ombudspersons for Future Generations as Sustainability Implementation Units. In: Stakeholder Forum Vol. 204. https://stakeholderforum.org/sdg2012-think-pieces/.
- Göpel, M. (2013). The Responsibility to Prevent: Early Warning Systems to Protect Future Generations, in: M.C. Cordonier Segger, S. Jodoin (eds.), Sustainable Development, International Criminal Justice and Treaty Implementation, Cambridge University Press, Cambridge.
- Göpel, M. (2014). Navigating a New Agenda: Questions and Answers on Paradigm Shifts & Transformational Change, working paper, Wuppertal Institute, http://epub.wupperinst.org/frontdoor/index/index/docId/5517.
- Göpel, M. (2016). The Great Mindshift: How a New Economic Paradigm and Sustainability Transformations Go Hand in Hand. Springer International, Berlin 2016, ISBN 978-3-319-43765-1, doi:10.1007/978-3-319-43766-8
- Göpel M. (2016) Why the Mainstream Economic Paradigm Cannot Inform Sustainability Transformations. In: The Great Mindshift. The Anthropocene: Politik—Economics—Society—Science, vol 2. Springer, Cham. https://doi.org/10.1007/978-3-319-43766-8_3
- Göpel, M. (2017). Shedding Some Light on the Invisible: The Transformative Power of Paradigm Shifts, in: T. Henfrey, G. Maschkowski and G. Penha-Lopes (eds.), Resilience, Community Action & Societal Transformation, Permanent Publications, pp. 113–140.
- Göpel, M. with Ioan Fazey et al. (2017). Ten Essentials for Action-Oriented and Second Order Energy Transitions, Transformations and Climate Change Research, in: Energy Research & Social Science, Vol. 40, pp. 54–70.
- As Co-Author of the German Advisory Council on Global Change (WBGU) (2019). Just & In-Time Climate Policy. Four Initiatives for a Fair Transformation, Policy Paper, https://www.wbgu.de/en/publications/publication/just-in-time-climate-policy-four-initiatives-for-a-fair-transformation.
- As Co-Author of the German Advisory Council on Global Change (WBGU) (2019). Towards Our Common Digital Future, Flagship Report, https://www.wbgu.de/en/publications/publication/towards-our-common-digital-future.
- As Co-Author of the German Advisory Council on Global Change (WBGU) (2019). Digital Momentum for the UN Sustainability Agenda in the 21st Century, Policy Paper, https://www.wbgu.de/en/publications/publication/pp10-2019.
- As Co-Author of the German Advisory Council on Global Change (WBGU) (2019). A European Way to Our Common Digital Future, Policy Paper, https://www.wbgu.de/en/publications/publication/pp11-2019.
- As Co-Author of the German Advisory Council on Global Change (WBGU) (2020). Rethinking Land in the Anthropocene: from Separation to Integration, Flagship Report, https://www.wbgu.de/en/publications/publication/landshift.
- Göpel, M. (2020). Unsere Welt neu denken: Eine Einladung. Ullstein, Berlin, ISBN 978-3-550-20079-3. Translations: Dutch, Greek, Japanese, Korean, Portuguese, Russian.
- Göpel, M. (2020). A Social-Green Deal, with Just Transition—the European Answer to the Coronavirus Crisis, in: Social Europe, 31. März 2020, https://socialeurope.eu/a-social-green-deal-with-just-transition-the-european-answer-to-the-coronavirus-crisis.
