= Raimund Bleischwitz =

German academic (born 1961)

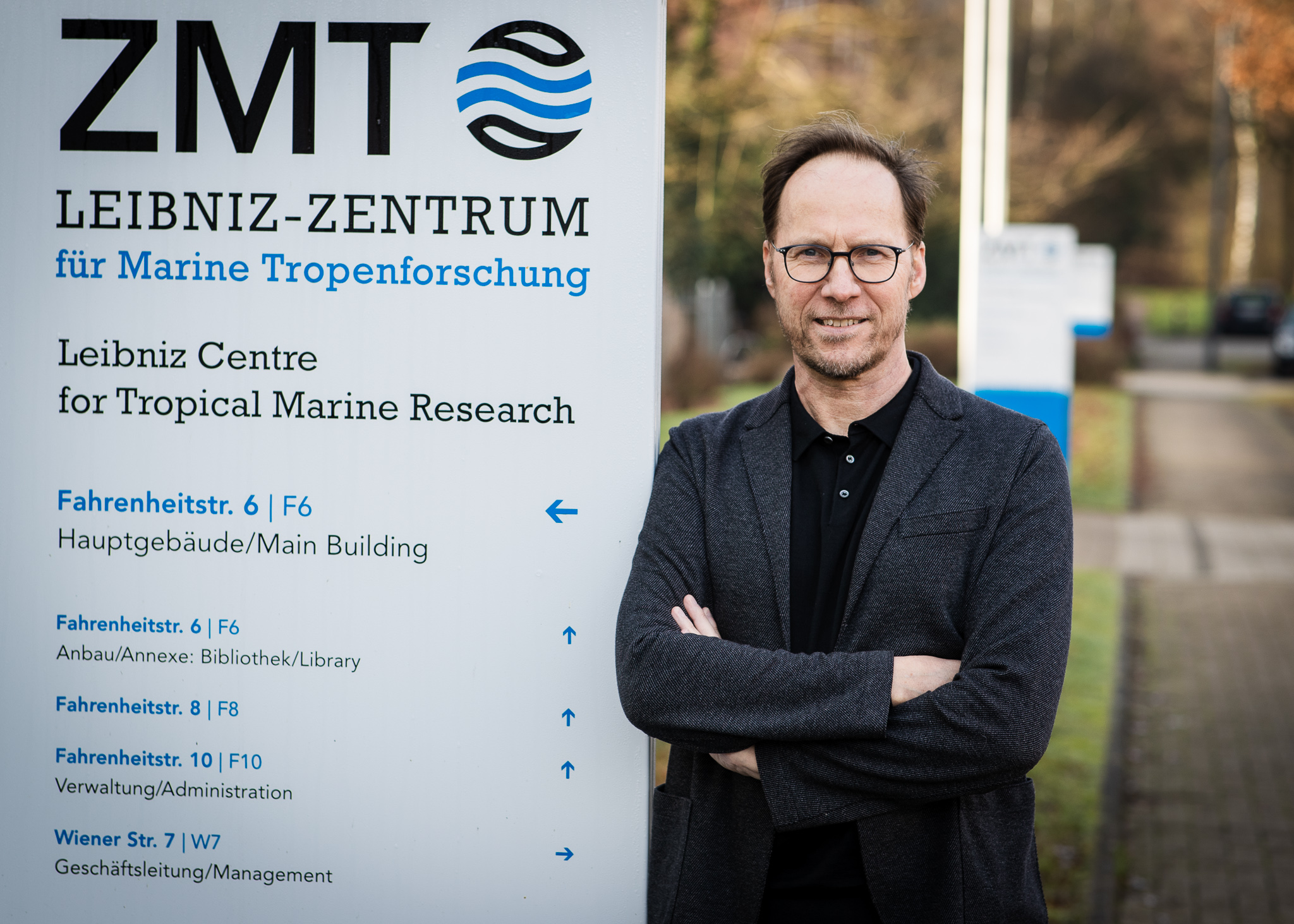
- Raimund Bleischwitz, 2022
- Born: August 7, 1961 (age 65); Mönchengladbach, Germany
- Occupation: Scientific Director of the Leibniz Centre for Tropical Marine Research
- Website: https://www.leibniz-zmt.de/en/marine-tropics-research/who-we-are/raimund-bleischwitz-en

Raimund Bleischwitz (born 7 August 1961) is a German economist. He is the Scientific Director of the Leibniz Centre for Tropical Marine Research (ZMT) in Bremen, Germany.

== Work ==
Bleischwitz is academic work is focused on environmental and resource economics. He worked as a policy adviser in topics of resource efficiency, circular economy, resource nexus, raw material conflicts, eco-innovation, incentive systems and policies, industry and sustainability.

With Holger Hoff, Catalina Spataru, Ester van der Voet, Stacy D. VanDeveer he is editor of the 2018 Routledge Handbook of the Resource Nexus.

At his time in Wuppertal Institute he was one of the authors of the book "Zukunftsfähiges Deutschland: Ein Beitrag zu einer Global Nachhaltigen Entwicklung", published by BUND and MISERIO in 1997.

== Early life ==
Bleischwitz was born in Mönchengladbach, Germany. After finishing his secondary school studies at Stiftisches Humanistisches Gymnasium in Mönchengladbach (1980), he pursued his university studies at University of Bonn. He wrote his PhD on resource productivity at University of Wuppertal (1998) and his Habilitation on collective goods and knowledge-creating institutions at University of Kassel (2005). He is married and has two children.

== Career ==
His career began in the late 1980s in the German Bundestag as a political adviser to the Social Democratic Party of Germany. He later worked as a researcher at the Institute for European Environmental Policy in Bonn and London.

In the early 1990s he was supporting Ernst Ulrich von Weizsäcker in establishing the Wuppertal Institute for Climate, Environment and Energy, where he headed the research management and later the "Factor 4" research desk. In 1996, together with Reinhard Loske, he coordinated the study "Sustainable Germany". In the late 1990s and early 2000s he was a researcher at the Max Planck Institute for Research on Collective Goods in Bonn, Germany and held various lecturer positions at Cologne Business School and at University of Bonn. He also participated in the Japanese study program Millennium Collaborations Projects on climate, energy and eco-efficiency conducted by the Japanese Economic and Social Research Institute and was a fellow at the Japanese Society for the Promotion of Science.

In the period 2003-2013 he acted as Co-Director of the Research Group on Material Flows and Resource Management at the Wuppertal Institute in Bonn, Germany, and since 2003 as a visiting professor at the College of Europe in Bruges, Belgium where he held the Toyota Chair for Industry and Sustainability. He held fellowships at the American Institute for Contemporary German Studies at Johns Hopkins University and at the Transatlantic Academy, both in Washington DC. From 2013 to 2018 he acted as the Deputy Director of the Institute for Sustainable Resources at University College London. From 2018 to 2021 he was the Director of UCL's Bartlett School of Environment Energy & Resources. In January 2022 Bleischwitz was appointed Scientific Director at the Leibniz Centre for Tropical Marine Research (ZMT) in Bremen, Germany.
