= Regeneration (ecology) =

Ability of an ecosystem to recover from damage

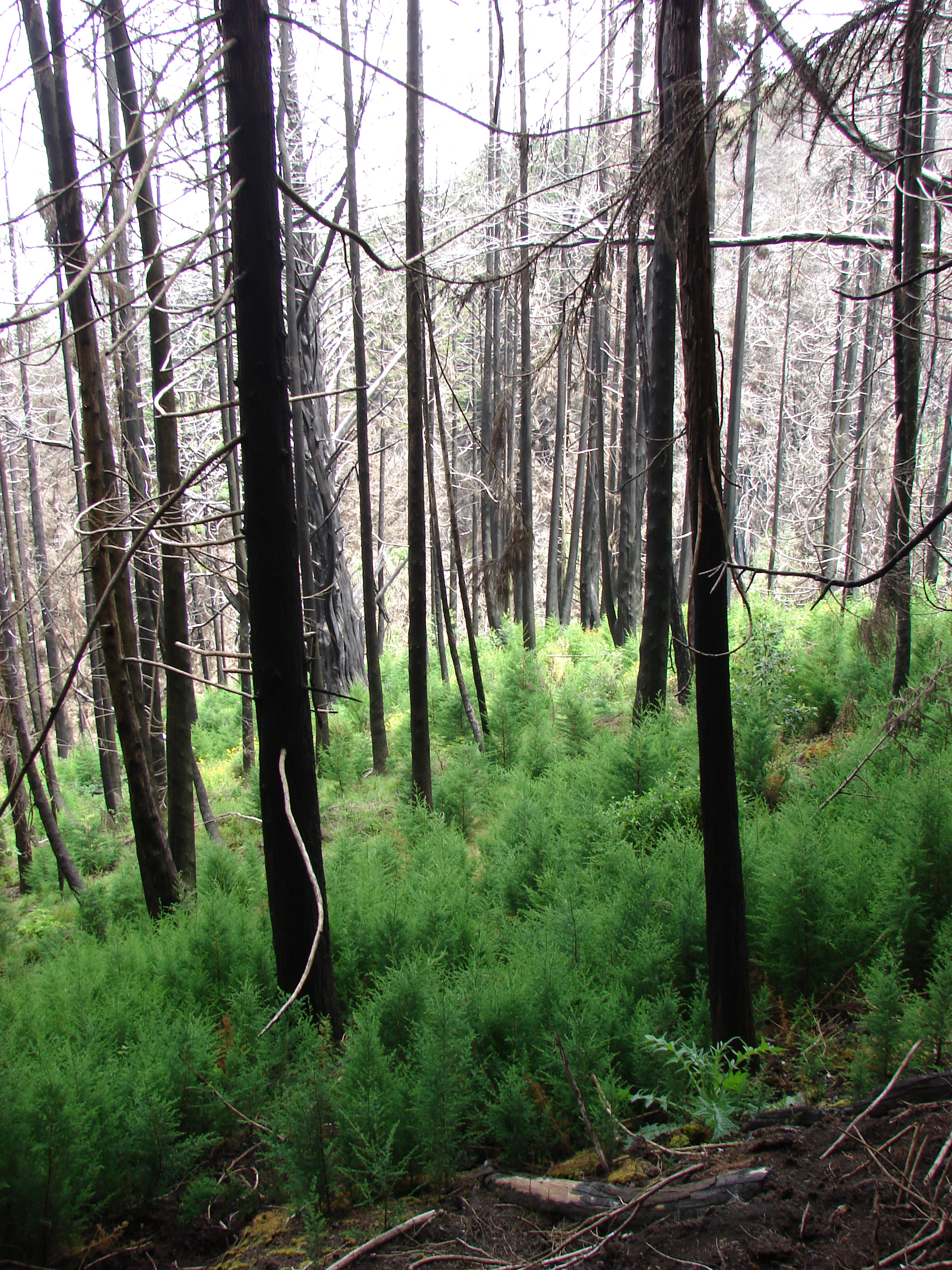
Cupressus macrocarpa saplings growing after a forest fire

In ecology regeneration is the ability of an ecosystem – specifically, the environment and its living population – to renew and recover from damage. It is a kind of biological regeneration.

== Process ==
Regeneration occurs in an ecosystem in response to organisms, principally plants, being eaten, disturbed, or harvested. Regeneration's biggest force is photosynthesis which transforms solar energy and nutrients into plant biomass. Resilience to minor disturbances is one characteristic feature of healthy ecosystems. Following major (lethal) disturbances, such as a fire or pest outbreak in a forest, an immediate return to the previous dynamic equilibrium will not be possible. Instead, pioneering species will occupy, compete for space, and establish themselves in the newly opened habitat. The new growth of seedlings and community assembly process is known as regeneration in ecology.

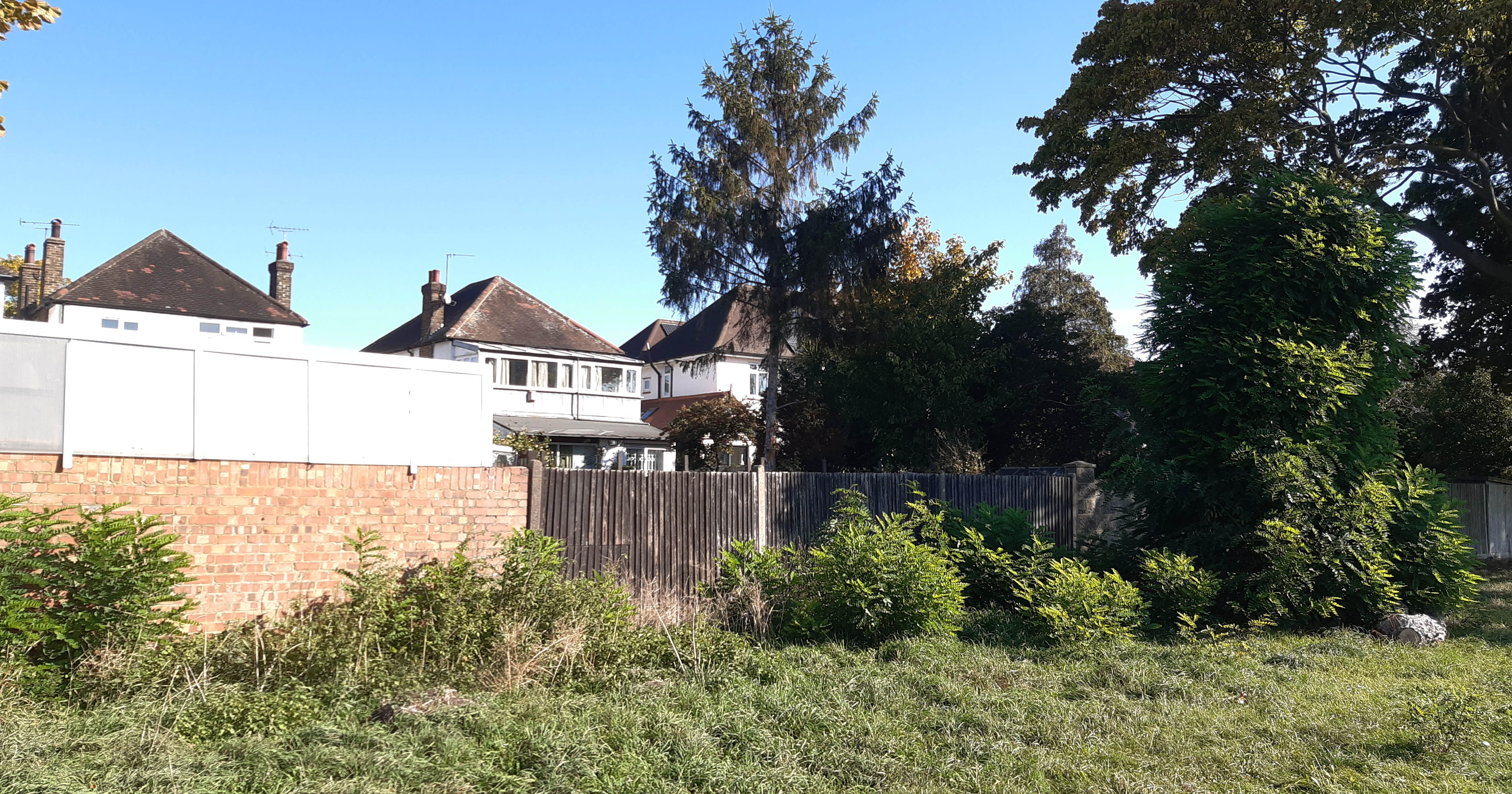
False Acacia regenerating by sending up many suckers from its roots, as far as 15 metres (left) from the cut trunk (right)

== Paradigm ==
In the 2020s, there is debate in sustainability science about regeneration, either as a new scholarly paradigm, an alternative to sustainability, or a sustainability strategy.

== See also ==
- Bush regeneration – Type of ecological restoration in Australia
- Biocapacity – Estimate of an ecosystem's production of certain biological materials
- Ecological restoration – Scientific study of renewing and restoring ecosystems
- Ecological stability – When an ecosystem does not drastically change over time even after perturbation}
- Forest ecology – Study of interactions between the biota and environment in forests
- Pioneer species – First species to colonize or inhabit damaged ecosystems
- Soil regeneration – Creation of new soil and rejuvenation of soil health
