= Resource management =

Efficient and effective deployment of an organization's resources when they are needed

In organizational studies, resource management is the efficient and effective development of an organization's resources when they are needed. Such resources may include financial resources, inventory, human skills, production resources, or information technology (IT) and natural resources.

In the realm of project management, processes, techniques and philosophies as to the best approach for allocating resources have been developed. These include discussions on functional vs. cross-functional resource allocation as well as processes espoused by organizations like the Project Management Institute (PMI) through their Project Management Body of Knowledge (PMBOK) methodology of project management. Resource management is a key element of activity resource estimating and project human resource management. Both are essential components of a comprehensive project management plan to execute and monitor a project successfully. As is the case with the larger discipline of project management, there are resource management software tools available that automate and assist the process of resource allocation to projects and portfolio resource transparency including supply and demand of resources.

== Corporate resource management process ==
Large organizations usually have a defined corporate resource management process which mainly guarantees that resources are never over-allocated across multiple projects. Peter Drucker wrote of the need to focus resources, abandoning less promising initiatives for every new project taken on, as fragmentation inhibits results.

== Techniques ==
One resource management technique is resource-leveling. It aims at smoothing the stock of resources on hand, reducing both excess inventories and shortages.

The required data are: the demands for various resources, forecast by period into the future as far as is reasonable, as well as the resources' configurations required in those demands, and the supply of the resources, again forecast by time into the future as far as is reasonable.

The goal is to achieve 100% utilization but that is very unlikely, when weighted by important metrics and subject to constraints, for example: meeting a minimum service level but otherwise minimizing cost. A Project Resource Allocation Matrix (PRAM) is maintained to visualize the resource allocations against various projects.

The principle is to invest in resources as stored capabilities, then unleash the capabilities as demanded.

A dimension of resource development is included in resource management by which investment in resources can be retained by a smaller additional investment to develop a new capability that is demanded, at a lower investment than disposing of the current resource and replacing it with another that has the demanded capability.

In conservation, resource management is a set of practices pertaining to maintaining natural systems' integrity. Examples of this form of management are air resource management, soil conservation, forestry, wildlife management and water resource management. The broad term for this type of resource management is natural resource management (NRM).

== See also ==
- Environmental management
- Factor 10
- Holistic management
- Industrial symbiosis
- List of resource management software
- Resource allocation
