= Factor 10 =

Socio-economic policy program

Factor Ten is a social and economic policy program developed by the Factor Ten Institute with the stated goal of "provid[ing] practical support for achieving significant advances in sustainable value creation, in particular through increases in resource productivity throughout the economy.

== History ==
Friedrich Schmidt-Bleek, from the Wuppertal Institute for Climate, Environment and Energy, first proposed the Factor 10 and dematerialization concepts in the early 1990s. He concluded in his studies that 80% of the world's resources are distributed among First World nations, which contribute 20% of the global population, so those nations are promoting an unsustainable system of development. The goal of Factor 10 is to assure that nations do not exceed the planet's carrying capacity but leave sufficient resources for future generations.

== Factor 4 ==
Factor 10 evolved from the less dramatic Factor 4 was originally proposed by L. Hunter Lovins and Amory Lovins of the Rocky Mountain Institute and Ernst von Weizsäcker, the founder of the Wuppertal Institute for Climate, Environment & Energy. Their book Factor 4 explains how simple it is for nations to achieve Factor 4 results with existing technologies. The concept attempts to reduce resource and energy use by 75% by doubling output and halving input of production.

== Goals ==
Factor 10 requires the creation of new technologies, policies, and manufacturing processes along with sociocultural change to create a global economy that is sustainable for a long period of time. The long-term goal of Factor 10, many governments and firms aspiring toward short term relief have difficulty achieving the massive reductions proposed by factor 10. The lack of existing incentives and policies for a sufficient resource-efficient economy requires an adjustment of economic and fiscal framework. Eco-efficiency, environmental purchasing design for environment, policies and environmental taxes have already been used by business and governments implementing the Factor 10 theory.

Factor 10 goes farther as a response to the United Nations Environment Programme call for a tenfold reduction in resource consumption in industrialized countries as a necessary long-term target if adequate resources are to be released for the needs of the developing countries. With the predicted rise in population and economic growth to maintain the level of pollution we have today, we need to be able to produce the same output for 10% of the impact.

Factor 10 concept is the direct way of using metric and various activities that can reduce the throughput of resources and energy in the given process. The essential question is by what factor certain flows can or should be reduced. It is a useful tool to monitor the performance of business in terms of dematerialization.
