= Eco-costs value ratio =

The EVR model is a life cycle assessment based method to analyse consumption patterns, business strategies and design options in terms of eco-efficient value creation. Next to this it is used to compare products and service systems (e.g. benchmarking).

The eco-costs/value ratio (EVR) is an indicator to reveal sustainable and unsustainable consumption patterns of people. The eco-costs is an indicator for the environmental pollution of the products people buy, the value is the price they pay for it in our free market economy. Example: When somebody spends 1000 euro per month on housing (in Europe: EVR approx. 0,3) it is less harmful for the environment than when 1000 euro is spent on diesel (in Europe: EVR approx. 1,0). See section 3.1.

The EVR is also relevant for business strategies, because companies are facing the slow but inevitable internalization of environmental costs. At the moment the costs of products don't take into account the environmental damage caused by these products. This "pollution is for free" mentality is less and less accepted by communities.

The EVR makes companies aware of the relative importance of the environmental pollution of their products, and the relative risk they run that future production costs will increase because of this internalization of environmental costs. By using the EVR, companies can make decisions for their product portfolio: abandon products with low value and high environmental costs and stimulate products with high value and low environmental costs. See sections 2.3 and 3.2.

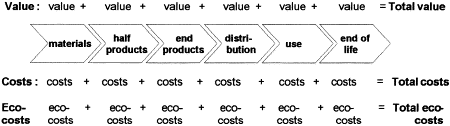
Figure 1: The basic idea of combining the economic and ecological chain: 'the EVR chain'.

== Background information ==
The EVR model has been introduced in 1998 and published in 2000–2004 in the International Journal of LCA, and in the Journal of Cleaner Production. The concept of EVR is based on eco-costs. In 2007, 2012 and in 2017, the eco-costs system was updated. General databases of eco-costs are provided (open source) at www.ecocostsvalue.com of Delft University of Technology (the Netherlands). In 2010 a book named "LCA-based assessment of sustainability: the Eco-costs/Value Ratio (EVR)" was published containing the most important articles about the EVR.

== Working principle ==
=== The model ===
EVR = Eco-costs/value. The basic idea of the EVR model is to link the 'value chain' to the ecological product chain. In the value chain, the added value (in terms of money) and the added costs are determined for each step of the product 'from cradle to grave'. Similarly, the ecological impact of each step in the product chain is expressed in terms of money, the so-called 'eco-costs'. See Figure 1. Note that there exists also a Porter chain from the right to the left in Figure 1, starting with waste and adding value by recycling. In this way the Porter chain becomes circular.

=== Eco-costs ===
Eco-costs express the amount of environmental burden of a product on basis of prevention of that burden. They are the marginal prevention costs (money) which should be made to reduce the environmental pollution and materials depletion in our world to a level which is in line with the carrying capacity of our earth.

As such, the eco-costs are virtual costs, since they are not yet integrated in the real life costs of current production chains (Life Cycle Costs). The eco-costs should be regarded as hidden obligations.

For example: for each 1000 kg CO_{2} emission, one should invest €135,- in offshore windmill parks (or other CO_{2} reduction systems at that price or less). When this is done consequently, the total CO_{2} emissions in the world will be reduced by 65% compared to the emissions in 2008. As a result global warming will stabilise. In short: "the eco-costs of 1000kg CO_{2} are € 135,-". Similar calculations can be made on the environmental burden of acidification, eutrophication, summer smog, fine dust, eco-toxicity, and the use of metals, fossil fuels and land (nature).

Eco-costs are used in Life Cycle Assessment, LCA, to assess the environmental performance of different materials, processes and End of Life methods.

=== Of products ===
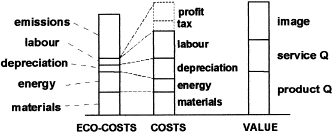
Figure 2: The decomposition of 'virtual eco-costs', costs and value of a product.

The EVR combines eco-cost and value to see whether a product will be successful. The product should have low environmental impact in its lifecycle (low eco-costs) and an attractive value for consumers. The value here is the market value (perceived customer value, also called fair price). Figure 2 depicts the three dimensions of a product: the value, the costs and the eco-costs.

It is a trend in society that heavy pollution of industry is not accepted anymore by the inhabitants of a country. This results in stricter regulations by countries (e.g. tradable emission rights, enforcement of best available technologies, eco-taxes, etc.). Eco-costs will then become part of the internal production costs. This internalizing of eco-costs might be a threat to a company, but it might also be an opportunity: “When my product has less eco-burden than that of my competitor, my product can withstand stricter regulations of the government. So this characteristic of low eco-costs of my product is a competitive edge.” To analyse the short term and the long term market prospects of a product or a product service combination (Product Service System, PSS), each product or PPS can be positioned in the portfolio matrix of Figure 3. The basic idea of the product portfolio matrix is the notion that a product, service or PSS is characterized by:

- its short term market potential: high value/costs ratio
- its long term market requirement: low eco-costs.

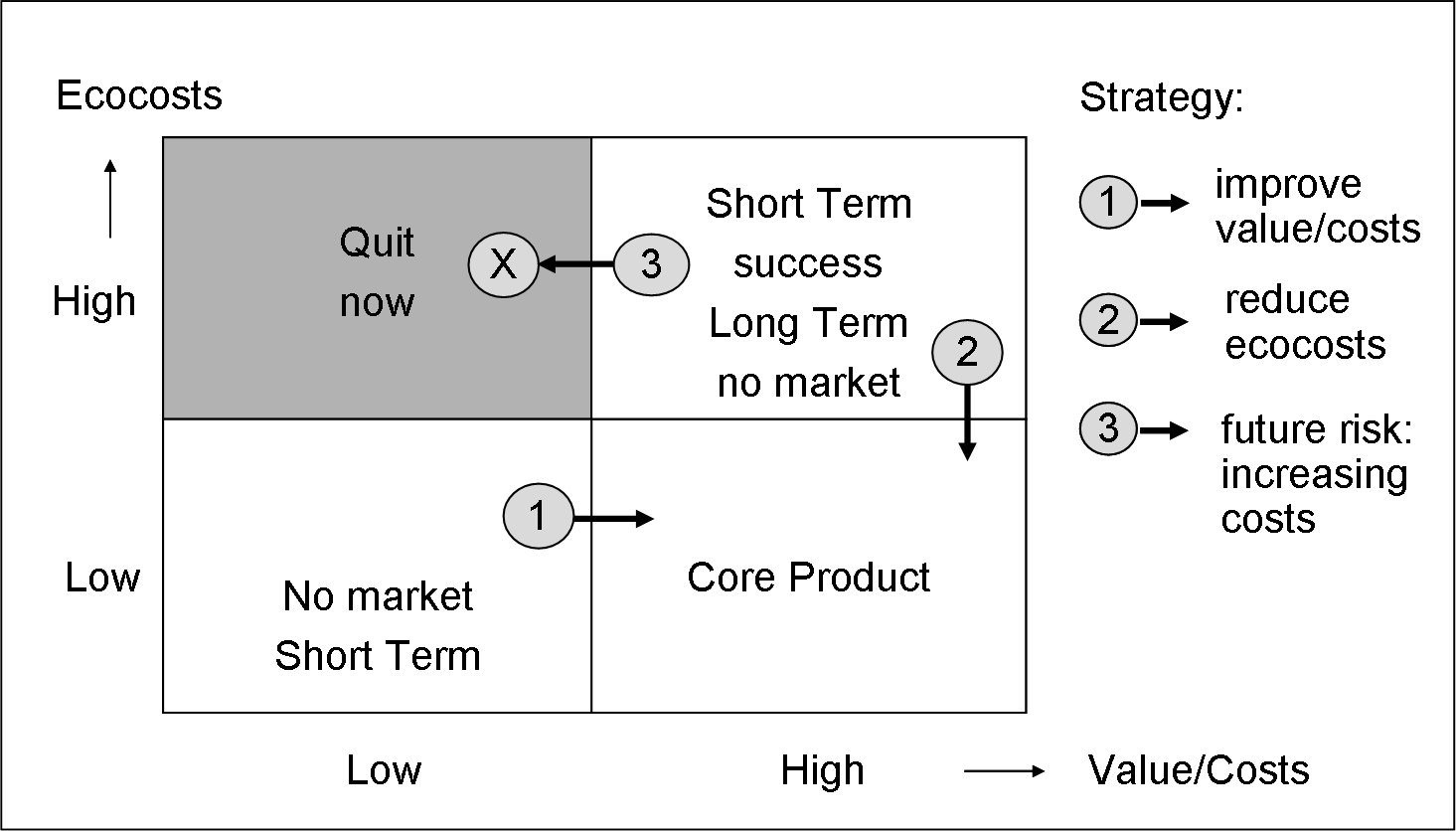
Figure 3: Product portfolio matrix for EVR product strategy of companies.

In terms of product strategy, the matrix results in 3 strategic directions:

1. enhance the value/costs ratio of a green design to create a bigger market
2. lower the eco-costs of current successful products to make it fit for future markets
3. abandon products with a low value/ costs ratio (not much profit, small market) and high eco-costs

For many 'green designs', the usual problem is that they have a low current value/costs ratio. In most of the cases the production costs are higher than the production costs of the classic solution, in some cases even the (perceived) quality is poor. There are two ways to do something about it:

a. enhance the (perceived) quality of the product

b. attach to the product a service (create a PSS) in a way that the value of the bundle of the product and the service is more than the value of its components.

For a product which has a good present value/costs ratio, but high eco-costs, the product and the production process have to be redesigned to lower the eco-costs. This road towards sustainability is often far more promising than the strategy of enhancing the value/costs ratio of a green design.

Figure 4: Design strategies to enhance the EVR of a product.

The reason is that the economies of scale for production and distribution are available and that the new product is marketed to an existing client base which is used to the brand name, the quality standards, the service system, etc.

Note: The most common fear of business managers is that their new green products end up with a deteriorated value/costs ratio, and hence will have a cumbersome position in the market. The stability of the governmental policy plays an important role here. When governmental regulations which level the playing field are postponed or even abandoned, proactive companies with sound product strategies are harmed. This can cause severe damage to the transition process and may lead to reluctance of players to move proactively in the future.

The most successful design options are depicted in Figure 4. The best design strategy is:

- to increase value where value is high
- to decrease the eco-costs where the eco-costs are high

== Use ==
=== De-linking ===
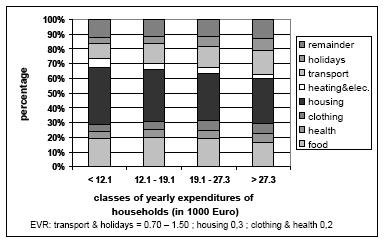
Figure 5. The consumer's side: preference of expenditures in Dutch households.

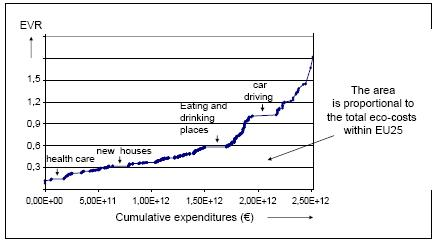
Figure 6. The EVR and the total expenditures of all consumers in the EU25 (from EIPRO)

In economics, de-linking (also known as decoupling) is often used in the context of economic production and environmental quality. In this context, it refers to the ability of an economy to grow without corresponding increases in environmental pressure. In many economies increasing production (GDP) would involve increased pressure on the environment. An economy that is able to sustain GDP growth, without also experiencing a worsening of environmental conditions, is said to be de-linked.

There is a consumer's side of the de-linking of economy and ecology. Under the assumption that most of the households spend in their life what they earn in their life, the total EVR of the spending of households is the key towards sustainability. Only when this total EVR of the spending gets lower, the eco-costs related to the total spending can be reduced even at a higher level of spending. There are two ways of achieving this:

- At the production side: the improvement of eco-efficiency ('lowering EVR') of products and services by the industry
- At the consumer's side: the change of lifestyle of customers in the direction of 'low EVR' products.

At the production side, society is heading in the right direction: gradually, industrial production is achieving higher levels of the value/costs ratio and is at the same time becoming cleaner. At the consumer's side, however, society is suffering from the fact that the consumers preferences are heading in the wrong direction: towards products and services with an unfavourable EVR (like driving in SUVs, more kilometres, intercontinental flights for holidays). These unfavourable preferences can be concluded from Figure 5.

Figure 5 shows that people in the Netherlands (and probably in the other EC countries as well) spend relatively more money on cars and holidays when they have more money available. Other studies show that people tend to have intercontinental holidays at the moment they can afford it. This shift in consumer spending will become a big problem in the near future, since the EVR of e.g. housing and health care is much lower than the EVR of transport and (inter)continental holidays by plane. Figure 6 shows the EVR (= ecocosts/price) on the Y/axis as a function of the cumulative expenditures of all products and services of all citizens in the EU 25 on the X-axis. The data is from the EIPRO study of the European Commission (EIPRO = environmental impact of products).

The area underneath the curve is proportional to the total eco-costs of the EU25. Basically there are two strategies to reduce the area under the curve: - ask industry to reduce the eco-costs of their products (this will shift the curve downward) - try to reduce expenditures of consumers in high end of the curve, and let them spend this money at the low end of the curve (this will shift the middle part of the curve to the right). The question is now how designers and engineers can contribute to this required shift towards sustainability and what this means to product portfolio strategies of companies. The solution is Eco-efficient Value Creation.

=== Eco-efficient value creation ===
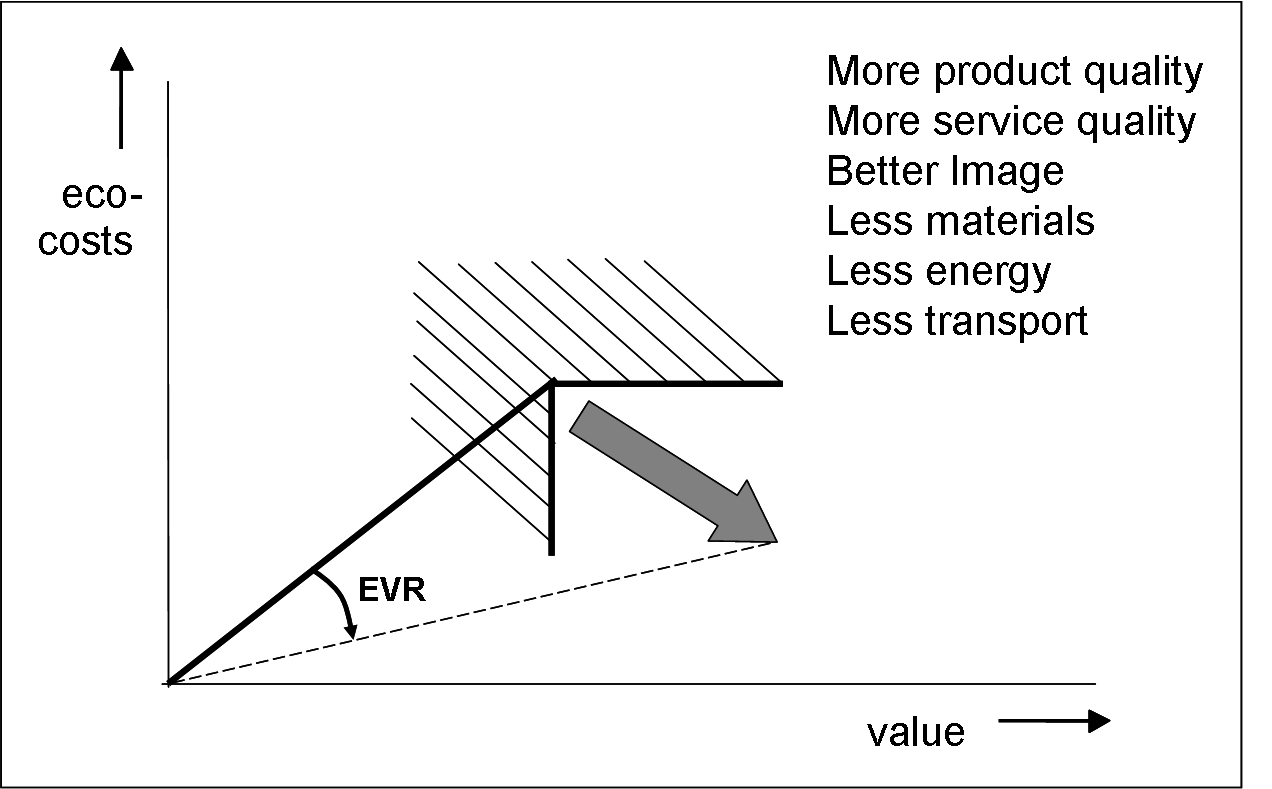
Figure 7: The double objectvive for design & engineering: less eco-costs, more value.

The way towards sustainability requires a double aim in product innovation, see Figure 7:

- lower eco-costs, and at the same time
- higher value (a higher market price).

We call this: eco-efficient value creation. The reason we need value creation for eco-efficient products is threefold:

1. the higher price in the market is required to cover the higher production cost of green products (note that a higher price is only accepted by the consumer when the perceived value is higher, otherwise the consumer will not buy the product)
2. the higher price prevents the rebound effect
3. lowering the EVR appears the key to a sustainable development at the level of countries (Figure 6)

Below, an example of eco-efficient value creation is given, which is the introduction of the Lexus RX 400h in the USA:

- the customer value has increased, by emphasising its combined power and comfort (from the advertisement in the US: "……While it may have a V6 engine under the hood, the extra boost from the electric-drive motor gives the vehicle the acceleration power of a V8……. and the noise levels in Lexus hybrid vehicles have been reduced even more")
- the eco-costs of driving are lower, since its excellent overall fuel economy

Note that the acceleration of a car is an interesting issue in terms of value. High acceleration is associated with expensive sports cars (Porsche, Ferrari). But people who buy these fast cars hardly use it. For these people acceleration is more part of the image of the product than it is part of the product qualities they use on a daily basis. So reducing the acceleration is the wrong strategy: it eliminates the extra value, and it hardly reduces the overall eco-costs in practice.

=== Environmental benchmarking in LCA ===
Life cycle assessment (LCA) is the generally accepted method to compare two (or more) alternative products or services. A prerequisite for such a comparison is that the functionality ('functional unit') and the quality of the alternatives are the same (you cannot compare apples and oranges in the classical LCA). In cases of product design and architecture, however, this prerequisite seems to be a fundamental flaw in the application of LCA: the designer or architect is aiming at a better quality (in the broad sense of the word: including intangible aspects like beauty and image), so the new design never has the same quality. In some cases the functionality of the design is not the same, since the design solution is limited by a maximum budget, in some cases the functionality is the same, but the higher quality results in a higher price. In all these cases a single indicator in LCA (like the eco-costs) is not suitable for environmental benchmarking. In these cases however, it does make sense to compare the design alternatives on the basis of the eco-costs/value ratio (EVR), where the value is the perceived customer value (the fair price). See section 3.1 on Delinking.

Example 1. Different types of armchairs differ in terms of comfort, aesthetics, etc. rather than in terms of functionality. A classical LCA (with a single indicator like eco-costs, carbon footprint, etc.) does not make sense here. Selection on the basis of EVR, however, is the key to a sustainable consumption pattern. The chair with the lowest EVR is the best solution in terms of sustainability.

Example 2. In LCA, the comparison of a new building and a renovated building is in the majority of cases not possible, since, in practice, both solutions differ in almost all quality aspects (tangible as well as intangible). However, the solution with lowest EVR is the best in terms of sustainable consumption.

Note that the renovated building is the best solution in most of the cases, because it has the lowest EVR in the production phase. However, in some cases the renovated building is not the best solution, because of unfavourable energy consumption (high EVR) in the use phase.
