= Sustainability strategies =

Mechanisms to foster sustainability

Sustainability strategies are mechanisms that contribute to achieving sustainability and are well-established in the field of sustainability science. Originally, the term centered on a triad introduced by Joseph Huber, encompassing sufficiency, efficiency, and consistency. Each of these strategies has since developed its own school of thought, emphasizing different merits and contributions to sustainability. In recent debates, further strategies are discussed, culminating in a recent framework by Eric Hartmann, which describes a total of ten sustainability strategies.

Sufficiency focuses on reducing consumption and production levels without threatening human needs. Following the typology by Maria Sandberg, four types of sufficiency can be distinguished, namely absolute reduction of consumption (e.g. less travels), modal shifts (e.g. switching from air travels to trains), sharing (e.g. carpooling) and increased longevity (e.g. repairing a bike instead of buying a new one). Sufficiency is often discussed in the context of the degrowth paradigm of sustainability. Efficiency aims to reduce resource use, energy consumption, or pollution per unit of consumption or production within existing production and consumption systems - such as improved fuel efficiency in cars or energy-saving appliances. It is often considered to share an elective affinity with the green growth paradigm. Consistency involves shifting to new industrial metabolisms that are more consistent with nature’s metabolism and hence cause less environmental damage (such as renewable energies and circular design). This strategy is implicitly advocated by the circular economy approach and rooted in industrial ecology.

== Sustainability strategy framework ==
In recent years, scholars have expanded the concept to explore the interrelations, potentials, and limitations of these strategies. A comprehensive conceptual framework was introduced by Eric Hartmann, defining sustainability strategies as mechanisms that help guarantee central human capabilities or limit and reduce environmental impacts, thereby promoting both intergenerational and intragenerational justice. Sustainability, in this view, is achieved when all individuals can satisfy fundamental human needs while environmental impacts remain within safe thresholds. The framework identifies a total of ten sustainability strategies, divided into five intergenerational and five intragenerational strategies.

=== Intergenerational strategies ===
Intergenerational strategies focus on reducing and limiting environmental impacts. They are based on the established triad of sufficiency, efficiency increase and consistency increases. This triad is complemented by two additional strategies, namely population reduction and regeneration expansion.

Population reduction describes reducing population growth voluntarily through, for instance, better family planning and reproductive healthcare. Under the assumption of a steady share of environmental impacts per person, this leads to a decrease in overall environmental impacts. Regeneration expansion encompasses processes that reduce absolute environmental pressure and restore the environment—activities such as reforestation or carbon dioxide removal. Hereby, the aim is not to only reduce negative environmental impacts caused by human behavior, but to create positive impacts on the natural environment.

=== Intragenerational strategies ===
Originally, the term sustainability strategies strongly focused on ecological aspects and the intragenerational dimension of sustainability. However, it has been expanded to adequately consider the fundamental human needs of people already living today. A set of five intragenerational strategies can be utilized to ensure everyone's central capabilities and satisfy fundamental human needs, including capability empowerment, equalization, eco-efficiency increase, impact expansion and population reduction.

First, capability empowerment targets production, consumption and individual rights in essential areas like nutrition, healthcare, and education so that people can live dignified, healthy lives. Second, equalization attempts to ensure fair access to resources and to reduce extreme inequality, so that one group’s overconsumption doesn’t deprive others of the basics. Third, eco-efficiency increase encompasses increased possibilities of production and consumption through efficiency, consistency and regeneration which could specifically help those in need. Furthermore, impact expansion can in principle foster central capabilities and the fulfillment of human needs. Where environmental limits are not threatened, allowing increased production, consumption and environmental impacts can support human development. This option has strongly been utilized historically, yet is no option today due to threatening environmental crises such as climate change and biodiversity loss. Finally, population reduction might also contribute to ensure intragenerational justice. Distributing environmental impacts and produced goods on a smaller population might foster central capabilities. However, family planning and reproduction are significant individual choices, strongly intertwined with central capabilities and must not be forced.

Together, these strategies form an integrative framework for fostering sustainability in practical implementation. Further research is necessary to understand potentials and limitations of different strategies in diverse areas of sustainability.
