= European Thermoelectric Society =

Non-profit organization based in Germany

The European Thermoelectric Society (ETS) is a non-profit organization founded in 1995. The goals of the ETS are to promote European research and development activities and professional networking in the field of thermoelectricity.

As of June 2021, the society had an average of about 100 members and is located in the Institute for Materials Sciences (Chair of Materials Chemistry) at the University of Stuttgart, Germany.

== History ==
The idea to establish a ″thermoelectric network″ within the European Union started to take shape at the 1st European Workshop on Thermoelectricity in Dresden, Germany in October 1994. The actual foundation assembly of the European Thermoelectric Society with participants from eight European countries was held in Cologne, Germany in February 1995. The first elected president was Hubert Scherrer (France).

== Purpose ==
The purpose of ETS is to represent the interests of everyone in Europe involved in thermoelectricity. It offers a platform to the European thermoelectric community to improve exchange of information and pool resources. On the other hand, it acts as a single point of contact for economy, politics and the interested public. It is committed to watch trends, give directions for future activities, develop visions, and render guidance to those interested in the field. An important function is to raise awareness of thermoelectricity and its applications in Europe.

In order to live up to these purposes, the ETS is organizer of conferences in topics of interest to the community and establishes a communication network between members. In addition, the ETS is in close contact to other thermoelectric groups and societies in Europe: DTG (Germany), STS (Switzerland), GDR TE (France), AIT (Italy) and worldwide (ITS).

== Structure ==
The society consists of the general assembly, the executive committee, the extended committee and the auditors.

The general assembly consists of all individual members of the society. A member can be any individual person from industry or academic institutions with activities or interests in thermoelectricity. Registration for the European Conference on Thermoelectrics (ECT) involves an obligatory one year membership. The executive committee consisting of president, secretary, and treasurer manages and represents the society, while the extended committee acts in an advisory capacity. The members of both committees are elected by the general assembly for a three-year term.

== Meetings ==
The European countries take turns at organizing the annual European Conference on Thermoelectrics (ECT) showcasing trends, developments, products and services of academia and industry in the field.

Every three years the ECT coincides with the International Conference on Thermoelectrics (ICT).

== Awards ==
Together with the German, Italian and Swiss Thermoelectric Societies, the ETS sponsors three poster prizes every year. The prizes are endowed with a prize money of 500 Euro each and awarded at the annual ECT.

== Honorary members ==
According to the ETS bylaws, the executive committee may appoint a person as honorary member in recognition of his achievements. On this basis, the long-time active members Hubert Scherrer (France) and Harald Böttner (Germany) were awarded the honorary membership at the ECT2013 in Noordwijk, Netherlands.
