= Wuppertal Institute for Climate, Environment and Energy =

German sustainability research institution

Coordinates: 51°15′19″N 7°09′09″E

- Industry: Research Institute
- Founded: 1991
- Headquarters: Wuppertal, Germany
- Key people: Manfred Fischedick, Scientific Managing Director; Michael Dedek, Business Manager
- Number of employees: about 250
- Website: wupperinst.org

The Wuppertal Institute for Climate, Environment and Energy (official German name: Wuppertal Institut für Klima, Umwelt, Energie gGmbH) is a German research institution for sustainability research, focusing on impacts and practical application. It explores and develops models, strategies, and instruments to support sustainable development at local, national, and international levels. Research at the Wuppertal Institute focuses on ecology and its relation to economy and society. Special emphasis is put on analyzing and supporting technological and social innovations that decouple the prosperity of economic growth from the use of natural resources. The organization's activities focus on developing transformation processes aimed at shaping a climate-friendly and resource-efficient world.

The institute was founded by politician Johannes Rau (SPD) and scientist Ernst Ulrich von Weizsäcker (SPD) in 1990 and 1991 and is mainly financed by the state of North Rhine-Westphalia.

== Organization and networks ==
The Wuppertal Institute collaborates with universities and institutes in Germany and abroad. It has formal cooperation agreements with the Lund University, the Department of Environmental Science and Engineering of the Tsinghua University Beijing, the University of Osnabrück, the HafenCity University Hamburg, the Center for Environment and Energy Research and Studies (CEERS) in Teheran and the Bergische Universität Wuppertal. A cooperation agreement was also reached with the University of Kassel. Joint research projects with the Institute for Global Environmental Strategies (IGES) in Japan and The Energy and Resources Institute (TERI) in India are regularly conducted. The institute is also a member of the Johannes Rau Research Association and the Ecological Research Network (Ecornet).

The Wuppertal Institute describes itself as an intermediary between science, economy and politics, meaning that its sustainability research design is application-oriented. It has the legal status of a non-profit limited company (gemeinnützige Gesellschaft mit beschränkter Haftung, according to German law). It receives basic funding from the Federal State of North Rhine-Westphalia, the sole owner of the Wuppertal Institute. The major part of its funding derives from third-party research projects. The Wuppertal Institute's clients cover governmental organizations ranging from local authorities to ministries at both state and national levels, business and industry ranging from medium-sized companies to corporate groups and industrial associations, civil society ranging from environmental associations to churches, and trade unions and foundations.

The Wuppertal Institute is based in Wuppertal and employs approximately 250 workers. Two-thirds are research staff and come from a wide variety of background disciplines: natural and environmental sciences, geography, systems sciences, engineering, planning, law, economics, and political and social science. The staff consists of roughly as many men as women. The Berlin office promotes cooperation with scientific institutes and research partners in the capital.

An International Advisory Board stands for the independence and the Institute's scientific quality and provides advice concerning strategic basic research issues.

== Financing of the Wuppertal Institute ==
The institute is financed by third-party funds (Drittmittel) and core funding from the state of North Rhine-Westphalia. The Wuppertal Institute is a non-profit GmbH whose sole owner is the state of North Rhine-Westphalia. The chairman of the supervisory board is a state secretary of the respective government.

== History ==
The Wuppertal Institute started its research work in 1991, headed by Ernst Ulrich von Weizsäcker. The later Federal President Johannes Rau (SPD) gave significant support to the founding when he was still Prime Minister of North Rhine-Westphalia. He ensured that the Wuppertal Institute for Climate, Environment and Energy was established in his hometown. The Institute's mission – formulated in its partnership agreement – was, first of all, to "promote measures and initiatives to secure the climate situation, to improve the environment and to save energy, as an interface between the scientific pursuit of knowledge and its practical application”. Founding President Ernst Ulrich von Weizsäcker advocated a resource strategy founded on reducing resource use by means of what he called an "efficiency revolution" pointing the way towards new models of prosperity. Efficiency is the cornerstone of the book Factor Four - Doubling Wealth, Halving Resource Use by Ernst Ulrich von Weizsäcker, Amory and Hunter Lovins (Rocky Mountain Institute, US). They assembled fifty examples of successful products using half the usual amount of natural resources, including hypercars, "Passivhaus", superwindows, long-lasting furniture, and a summer holiday in the Austrian Alps. The book was accepted as a report to the Club of Rome, and was on the best-seller lists for several months. It has been translated into more than ten languages.

Peter Hennicke studied and worked on using efficiency potentials in the field of energy use before he came to the Wuppertal Institute. He intensified research in this area as head of the Energy Division; later on, he succeeded Ernst Ulrich von Weizsäcker as president from 2000 to 2008. Friedrich Schmidt-Bleek, the vice-president at that time, found a large audience proposing his MIPS concept for gauging material input per service unit and identifying "ecological rucksacks" that "carry" products and services when they arrive at the consumer. He was aware of the fact that the then prevailing environmental policy was not paying enough attention to the great material flows; he advocated that besides already existing successful legal measures for pollutant emissions limitation, it would be necessary to reduce the material flows to conserve the finite material, energy, and natural resources. With his concept of the “Ecological rucksack” he introduced his ideas into scientific and political debates.

In 2001, the Tokyo-based Takeda Foundation awarded Ernst Ulrich von Weizsäcker and Friedrich Schmidt-Bleek a price worth one hundred million Japanese yen for their concepts "Factor Four", "MIPS" and "ecological rucksack", an expression of the Wuppertal Institute's international recognition.

Following the Earth Summit in Rio de Janeiro, the implementation of Agenda 21 was high on the (environmental) policy agenda in many countries. The first attempts were very timid and showed a lack of experience in implementing the new leading principle called sustainable development. The 1995 report Zukunftsfähiges Deutschland (published as “Greening the North”), commissioned by BUND and Misereor, was to remedy this: The Wuppertal Institute team, headed by Reinhard Loske and Raimund Bleischwitz, pioneered a new methodology. Beginning with an estimate of the Earth's carrying capacity, the "environmental space", the study developed leading principles to help Germans avoid overusing the environmental space to which they are "entitled". The principles are based on concepts such as efficiency and sufficiency.

Prof. Dr. Wolfang Sachs, a scientist of the Wuppertal Institute, member of the Club of Rome, and lead author at the Intergovernmental Panel on Climate Change (IPCC), directed the study “Sustainable Germany in a Globalized World”. It was published as a book in October 2008 by Friends of the Earth Germany (BUND), Church Development Service (Evangelischer Entwicklungsdienst - EED) and "Friends of the Earth" to stimulate the social discussion on globally sustainable development.

Agreed in 1997, the Kyoto Protocol took the global nature of the climate change into account, even if it was ratified only many years later. The Kyoto Protocol was the first international agreement to limit greenhouse gas emissions. The Wuppertal Institute's Climate Policy Division was closely involved in setting this milestone in the international climate debate.

In 2002, the state of North Rhine-Westphalia decided to no longer support the institute. The Wuppertal Institute examined the matter on the recommendation of the respected Science Council, which advises the federal and state governments on research policy matters.

The institute's environmental policy tasks are still important and worthy of support, but the concrete work suffers from serious conceptual deficiencies, said the council. Qualified research is particularly lacking in the fields of transport and climate development.

In August 2005, the United Nations Environment Programme (UNEP) and the Wuppertal Institute jointly founded the Center on Sustainable Consumption and Production (CSCP). As a member of the globally cooperating UNEP Centers, its mission is to develop practically oriented contributions to the ten-year Sustainable Consumption and Production program that was agreed upon at the World Summit on Sustainable Development in Johannesburg in 2002.

In September 2004, the Wuppertal Institute's Berlin office was established under the direction of Hermann E. Ott. Wolfgang Sachs took over the management in 2009, Maja Göpel in 2013, and Daniel Vallentin and Timon Wehnert in 2017. Since 2019 Timon Wehnert and Stefan Werland are heading the Berlin office.

Since its foundation, the Wuppertal Institute has been working on visions for a sustainable, low-CO_{2} society. Based on the goal of reducing greenhouse gas emissions in Germany by 80 percent by 2050, the Wuppertal Institute has developed various long-term scenarios for the German energy system. They serve as a basis for the long-term energy study of the German government and also the climate protection policies of municipalities' strategies towards the long-term goal of a low-carbon society. A study commissioned by Siemens AG for the city of Munich shows what this could look like. Long-term energy scenarios, such as those developed by the Wuppertal Institute together with research partners for the German Federal Ministry of the Environment, contributed to the German government's decision after the Fukushima reactor accident to abandon nuclear power generation and initiate the energy turnaround.

Uwe Schneidewind became the third president of the institute on March 1, 2010. He took over as successor to Peter Hennicke after he had retired for more than two years. Schneidewind holds a professorship at the Bergische Universität Wuppertal. At the Wuppertal Institute, Schneidewind placed the transdisciplinary understanding of science within the conceptual framework of transition research. In 2011 the German Advisory Council on Global Change (WBGU) published its main report "World in Transition – A Social Contract for Sustainability", which calls for a fundamental change: a shift from a fossil to a post-fossil society. The task of research, it states, is to examine these transition processes and to support the transformation through specific innovations in the relevant sectors. This approach characterizes the scientific work at the institute. It also includes the question of securing prosperity, the "good life", beyond unrestrained economic growth. In the sustainability discourse, it is becoming increasingly clear that more efficient use of resources is eminently important, but it is not enough because rebound effects often reduce efficiency gains. The Wuppertal Institute is conducting ever more concrete research into how sufficiency strategies can be effective and how they can be used politically, in fields such as construction, energy or local politics.

In summer 2018, the book "Die Große Transformation – Eine Einführung in die Kunst gesellschaftlichen Wandels" by Uwe Schneidewind was published. The book aims to find answers to the question of how the transformation to a socially and ecologically just world can succeed. For this, it needs “Zukunftskunst” ("future art"), writes Schneidewind. It refers to the ability to combine cultural change, smart politics, new economic activity, and innovative technologies, and on this basis to make creative contributions to the implementation of the energy turnaround, mobility turnaround, food turnaround or sustainable change in cities.

Uwe Schneidewind left the Wuppertal Institute on 30 April 2020. Since May 1, 2020, Manfred Fischedick has been leading the Institute as Scientific Managing Director. Manfred Fischedick, who studied engineering and is a Professor of Economics at the Schumpeter School of Business and Economics at the Bergische Universität Wuppertal, deals in his work with system analytical questions, aspects of innovation dynamics and the market introduction of new technologies.

== Research ==
Conceiving strategies for sustainable development requires an integrated approach both to policy and to scientific research. The quest to live and work in a way that conserves resources often raises questions that cannot be answered by one area of policy alone or by a single scientific discipline. This is the Wuppertal Institute's starting point. Its interdisciplinary research teams bring together the expertise of scientists and economists as well as geographers and spatial planners, engineers, philosophers, and historians.

The Wuppertal Institute conducts research at an international level. The Institute's international research activities follow a transformative approach, where researchers work in transdisciplinary and multicultural teams that address global and context-specific sustainability challenges.

The Institute's main research areas at the international level include the energy and industry system transitions, global climate governance, the low-carbon urban transformation (incl. mobility), sustainable production and consumption, and the circular economy.

In 2019, structural changes were implemented as the institute grew in size. 13 new Research Units organized within the four divisions began their work. With the new structure, the institute intends to take into account the higher management complexity and also to position the research fields more clearly.

In its scientific activities, the Institute advises ministries at the federal and state level as well as the European Union and is thus frequently in the public eye. On 2 March 2020, Svenja Schulze (German Federal Minister of the Environment) and Manfred Fischedick presented the federal government's first "Digital Policy Agenda for the Environment" at a federal press conference. It contains 70 concrete measures that combine digitalization and climate protection, such as The Federal Environment Agency, to create a registry for data centers as a data basis for future efficiency targets. Smartphones and tablets are to be given a longer life through new rules at EU level, thereby saving resources. Under the European Union's Ecodesign Directive, manufacturers will be required to make batteries and display replaceable and offer spare parts or updates for a minimum period. The Wuppertal Institute intensively accompanied the Federal Ministry of the Environment in the preparation of the environmental digital agenda and provided scientific advice.

The scientific work of the institute is mainly conducted in four divisions, which are divided into Research Units.

The Division Future Energy and Mobility Systems examines questions of technology and infrastructure, taking a systems analysis approach. In the fields of energy and mobility, it explores what technical and social innovations will facilitate the transition to sustainable structures, what implications this process has and what chances it offers. It sees key challenges in the decarbonization of energy systems, the climate-friendly restructuring of energy-intensive industries, and the sustainable modernization of our cities. The following Research Units belong to the division:

- International Energy Transitions
  This Research Unit develops solution paths for sustainable energy systems and industrial transformation in developing regions - especially in Southeast Asia, Latin America and the MENA region.
- Sectors and Technologies
  This research team develops strategies for the climate neutrality of the energy, transport and industrial sectors, taking into account their energy and resource impacts.
- Structural Change and Innovation
  This Research Unit shapes sustainable structural change, contributes to increasing the innovative capacity of industrial regions and evaluates opportunities from climate change and resource conservation.
- Systems and Infrastructures
  This Research Unit analyses the interaction of technologies, infrastructures and energy sources for the transformation to a sustainable energy system.

The Division Energy-, Transport- and Climate-Policy focuses on strategies and instruments for effective and integrated energy, transport and climate policies at the local, regional, national and international level. Central themes are the synergy effects of policy strategies that support the sustainable development of energy and transport systems as well as climate protection generally as well as policy instruments in the field of energy end-use efficiency. The following Research Units belong to the division:

- Global Climate Governance
  The unit sees itself as a navigator of international governance processes and, as an architect of transformative solutions on a global level, develops integrated strategies and instruments for the transformation to sustainability.
- Energy Policy
  This Research Unit analyses policy packages and instruments for the transition to a sustainable, largely carbon-free, energy-efficient and renewable energy system.
- Mobility and International Cooperation
  The research team develops implementation-oriented global concepts that combine local demand, expertise and policy advice with financing institutions.
- Mobility and Transport Policy
  The researchers investigate which policies and actors can shape the transformation of the transport system towards sustainable mobility in Germany.
- Urban Transitions
  The Research Unit develops innovative concepts and instruments that enable sustainable transformations in cities and regions.

The Division Sustainable Production and Consumption develops instruments, concepts and strategies to promote the transition to more sustainable patterns of production and consumption. The division explores opportunities for creating a sustainable, resource-light society, and a socio-ecological market economy in which products and services offer a high quality of life and are produced sustainably, globally and locally. One of the main elements is the development and market launch of products considered sustainable in terms of their entire life cycle as well as production processes optimized right the way along the added value chain. The research focuses on the social-ecological balance of entrepreneurial, social, and technological changes and innovations in line with the implementation of the United Nations' international Sustainable Development Goals (SDGs). The following Research Units belong to the division:

- Innovation Labs
  This Research Unit develops open innovation processes for sustainable production and consumption patterns in companies and municipalities, politics and society.
- Production and Consumption Systems. The research team analyses and evaluates production and consumption structures from the perspective of resource efficiency and sustainability.

The Division Circular Economy focuses its research on how to succeed in transforming the resource-intensive, linear economy into a circular economy in which the value and the raw materials contained in products are preserved in the best way possible after their usage phase. The division develops targets and instruments for environmental services and digitalization, which enables closed material cycles and creates the conditions for sustainable digitalization. Germany and the European Union target a comprehensive transition towards a circular economy, in which waste should be avoided, products and their components should be used as long as possible, and waste is regarded as a potential resource. Related challenges and questions focuses on the design of infrastructures, policy mixes and governance structures. Necessary innovation processes are the starting point for the institute's research. The following Research Units belong to the division:

- Digital Transformation
  The Research Unit examines the perspectives of digitalization and how it can be used for sustainability transformation and to achieve a sustainable digital transformation.
- Material Loops
  The focus of this Research Unit is the closing of material cycles as a central prerequisite for a sustainable, globally viable level of resource consumption.

Berlin Office
As a branch of the Wuppertal Institute, the Berlin office promotes cooperation between the Wuppertal Institute and other academic and research institutions in Berlin.

== See also ==
- Factor 10
- Material input per service unit
