= German Advisory Council on Global Change =

German independent scientific advisory body

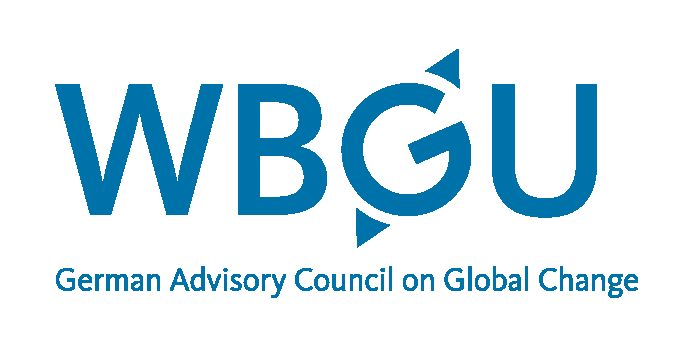
- Founded: 1992
- Location: Berlin, Deutschland
- Website: www.wbgu.de

The German Advisory Council on Global Change (German: Wissenschaftlicher Beirat der Bundesregierung Globale Umweltveränderungen, WBGU) is an independent, scientific advisory body to the German Federal Government, established in 1992 in the run-up to the Rio Earth Summit (UNCED).

The Council's principal tasks are to:

- analyse global environment and development problems and report on these,
- review and evaluate national and international research in the field of global change,
- provide early warning of new issue areas,
- identify gaps in research and to initiate new research,
- monitor and assess national and international policies for the achievement of sustainable development,
- elaborate recommendations for action and research and
- raise public awareness and heighten the media profile of global change issues.

The WBGU also comments on current events, such as the United Nations Climate Change conferences (e.g., in Paris 2015), the United Nations Conference on Sustainable Development (Rio+20), the adoption of the Sustainable Development Goals (2015), the United Nations Conference on Housing and Sustainable Urban Development Habitat III (2016) or Germany's G20 presidency in 2017. Meinhard Schulz-Baldes (1993–2008), Inge Paulini (2008–2017) and Maja Göpel (2017–2020) served as WBGU Secretaries-General.

== Flagship reports ==
- Water in a Heated World (2024)
- Healthy living on a healthy planet (2023)
- Rethinking Land in the Anthropocene: from Separation to Integration (2020)
- Towards our Common Digital Future (2019)
- Humanity on the move: The transformative power of cities (2016)
- World in Transition – Governing the Marine Heritage (2013)
- World in Transition – A Social Contract for Sustainability (2011)
- World in Transition – Future Bioenergy and Sustainable Land Use (2008)
- World in Transition – Climate Change as a Security Risk (2007)
- World in Transition – Fighting Poverty through Environmental Policy (2004)
- World in Transition – Towards Sustainable Energy Systems (2003)
- World in Transition – New Structures for Global Environmental Policy (2000)
- World in Transition – Conservation and Sustainable Use of the Biosphere (1999)
- World in Transition – Strategies for Managing Global Environmental Risks (1998)
- World in Transition – Ways Towards Sustainable Management of Freshwater Resources (1997)
- World in Transition – The Research Challenge (1996)
- World in Transition – Ways Towards Global Environmental Solutions (1995)
- World in Transition – The Threat to Soils (1994)
- World in Transition – Basic Structure of Global People-Environment Interactions (1993)
