= Eco-sufficiency =

Reduction in energy and resource consumption

Ecological sufficiency, or simply sufficiency, refers to the concept or strategy to reduce the environmental footprint of societies through moderating the need for energy, carbon and material-based services and products. The term was popularised by authors such as Thomas Princen, a professor at MIT, in his 2005 book The Logic of Sufficiency. As a goal, sufficiency is about ensuring that all humans can live a good life within planetary boundaries, meaning without overshooting the ecological limits of the Earth and thus limiting resource use and pollution. Princen argues that "seeking enough when more is possible is both intuitive and rational – personally, organizationally and ecologically. And under global ecological constraint, it is ethical."

In order to operationalise sufficiency, principles and ideas of concrete actions and policies have been proposed by various authors. Sufficiency may be approached at the individual level as a personal attitude or life philosophy (such as in the Sobriété heureuse concept of French environmentalist Pierre Rabhi, or Uwe Schneidewind's concept of the "Good Life"), as well as a core collective value that could amend the notion of liberal societies. In terms of lifestyles, it is strongly related to the concepts of voluntary simplicity and downshifting.

There are significant barriers to the widespread adoption of sufficiency, as it goes against current dominant social paradigms (economic growth focus, materialism, individualism, etc.). However, there are signs of change in some trends, be they motivated by environmental concerns or other co-benefits. Sufficiency usually triggers debates around the notions of needs, wants, and 'enoughness'. Its impact on the economy and the role of rebound effects are also challenges to be addressed.

The Russian invasion of Ukraine and subsequent energy crisis in 2022 have put a significant pressure on energy supply, notably in Europe, and popularised the concept of sufficiency and sufficiency policies. For instance, France has published a National energy sufficiency plan in October 2022 (Plan national de sobriété énergétique).

== Background ==
=== Definitions ===
Sufficiency is a concept that relates both to an ideal and a strategy to achieve it.

As a goal, sufficiency is about ensuring that all humans can live a good life without overshooting the ecological limits of the Earth (for now and generations to come), and defining what that good life may be made of. As a sustainability strategy, sufficiency is mainly concerned with the limitation and reduction of consumption and production levels without threatening the fulfillment of fundamental human needs. For this endeavor, potential is primarily seen in the Global North, where consumption levels and environmental impacts are particularly high.

As an increasing number of experts consider that technical progress and greener technologies alone will not be enough to achieve this goal, sufficiency also designates the societal transformations (in terms of lifestyles, social practices, infrastructures, etc.) that will be necessary to bring production and consumption patterns to a level compatible with the goal. It raises the question of individual and social limitations on these current patterns, building in particular on a sense of "enoughness". The IPCC defines sufficiency as "a set of policy measures and daily practices that avoid the demand for energy, materials, land, water, and other natural resources while providing wellbeing for all within the planetary boundaries".

The term sufficiency has been popularised by Thomas Princen's book The Logic of Sufficiency published in 2005, in which he argues that "seeking enough when more is possible is both intuitive and rational – personally, organizationally and ecologically. And under global ecological constraint, it is ethical."

Sufficiency may be approached at individual level as a personal attitude or life philosophy (such as in the Sobriété heureuse concept of French environmentalist Pierre Rabhi, or Schneidewind's concept of the 'Good Life'), as well as a core collective value that could amend the notion of liberal societies.

Sufficiency can be interpreted and discussed in virtually all social settings and economic sectors. In terms of lifestyles, it is strongly related to the concepts of voluntary simplicity and downshifting.

=== Energy sufficiency ===
The concept of sufficiency has been primarily developed in the area of energy consumption, where levels of greenhouse gas emissions far exceed what the planet may absorb and "rapid, far-reaching and unprecedented changes in all aspects of society" are necessary according to IPCC.

Drawing on the limits of technical efficiency and rebound effects, sufficiency proponents argue that energy demand and its associated emissions cannot be sufficiently reduced if the root causes of this demand are not addressed, that is the nature and level of the energy services our societies rely on.

In that prospect, energy sufficiency is about questioning and reducing energy demand through "changes in quantity or quality" of the energy-based services consumed, notably by "favouring behaviours and activities that are intrinsically low on energy use".

The boundary between efficiency and sufficiency actions are not always precisely set; Some authors have a broad conception of efficiency that may include aspects of lifestyle change.

Academic work released in 2022 systematically classified and databased specific public policy measures that can, individually collectively, contribute to the uptake energy sufficiency.

=== Material sufficiency ===
Sufficiency is also applicable to material consumption. Similar to energy sufficiency, it consists in reducing demand for services and activities requiring high level of material resources, and favouring intrinsically lean ones. It is for instance associated with the ideas of avoiding wasteful consumption, owning fewer products, and prolonging their lifetimes.

Here also, depending on authors' definitions, the boundary between efficiency and sufficiency may not always be perfectly drawn. As an illustration, a report for UNEP classifies items such as reducing living spaces, driving smaller cars and car sharing as material efficiency, while they would be more traditionally viewed as sufficiency.

== Potential impact ==
Sufficiency largely remains a blindspot in most established ecological/energy transition scenarios, where efficiency and greener technologies are the main and only strategies usually modelled.

There are exceptions though. The French négaWatt Association has assessed the potential of energy sufficiency at the level of France, through its national négaWatt 2050 scenario. The scenario is based on three principles (sufficiency-efficiency-renewables) with the goal of reaching a factor 2 reduction on energy demand and factor 4 on greenhouse gas emissions by 2050, involving changes in lifestyles and societal organisation considered as reasonable by the modellers. Sufficiency appears to be able to provide more final energy savings than efficiency.

A German study found that sufficiency measures could lead to a theoretical reduction of 70% of energy consumption at the level of households. The calculation assumes sufficiency measures encompassing the size of appliances (smaller, fewer appliances) as well as in their usage patterns.

A number of other scenarios and models lead to similar conclusions on the magnitude of saving potentials.

In order to encourage and improve the robustness and visibility of sufficiency modelling in energy scenarios, guidelines and recommendations have been published e.g. by the Ministry of Environment in Germany, or the SHIFT Project in France).

== Implementation ==
=== Principles ===
While several established environmental strategies and policies do not question upstream the need for perpetual growth in energy and material services, sufficiency does. It needs to be translated into implementation principles to challenge current lifestyles and social paradigms. The "Four D's" suggested by Wolfgang Sachs are one example:

1. Decelerate (going slower and less far);
2. De-clutter (accumulate fewer things);
3. Decentralize (choosing local and regional);
4. Decommercialization (leaving less room for the market).

The discussion about sufficiency principles is not restricted to a particular area or sector, and may relate to broad lifestyle aspects such as quality of life and work-life balance.

Sufficiency, as a strategy, may also be operationalised through distinguishing between different approaches to limiting the need for energy/resource-intensive services:

1. Reducing (i.e. consuming less);
2. Substituting (replacing highly-consuming services by less intensive ones);
3. Better sizing (avoiding oversized services and waste);
4. Sharing (optimising the use of each energy/resource-based service).

The sufficiency theory also overlaps with the concept of 'consumption corridors'. This concept emerged notably from a transdisciplinary research program funded by the German Ministry for Education and Research, entitled "From Knowledge to Action – New Paths towards Sustainable Consumption." Consumption corridors define a space between what is socially enough (the floor) and environmentally not too much (the ceiling).

=== Concrete sufficiency actions ===
There are many examples of individual and collective actions and changes that fall under the sufficiency approach. The following (non-exhaustive) list provides some:

- Living and working in smaller (or shared) spaces;
- Moderating internal temperatures in buildings;
- Using natural rather than artificial light;
- Choosing smaller appliances (or at least commensurate to actual needs);
- Owning and using less (often) appliances and electronic products;
- Sharing equipment between businesses;
- Flying less;
- Favouring low-energy transport modes (walking, cycling...);
- Sharing vehicles;
- Promoting remote work and flextime;
- Prolonging the lifetime of products through repairing, re-using, and fighting obsolescence;
- Refraining from fast fashion;
- Favouring local low-techs over high-techs;
- Switching to vegan and vegetarian diets;
- Buying locally produced food;
- Avoiding food waste and packaging waste.

== Sufficiency drivers and policies ==
One of the main barriers to sufficiency, often put forward by sceptics, is the dominant social paradigm in liberal societies which values material possession, greed, power, individualism, social differentiation through consumption, and other mindsets that conflict with the mentalities that sufficiency requires (temperance, moderation, downsizing, etc.). However, as environmental concerns grow, there are also signs showing the potential beginning of sufficiency trends. Three examples are:

- The growth of cycling for daily trips in an increasing number of cities worldwide;
- The "flight shame" movement;
- The reduction of average beef consumption in some countries (e.g. France).

The role of intentionality in sufficiency is debated. While for many authors sufficiency requires (as a starting point) a profound and voluntary reassessment of personal and collective priorities in light of the Earth's limits, for others, audiences could be "nudged" or persuaded into taking some sufficiency actions without either being engaged with the issue or being primarily motivated by environmental concerns. There appear to be many co-benefits to sufficiency actions that could encourage their uptake, e.g. health and animal welfare for vegetarian diets, air pollution reduction for driving less, children's health for limiting screen use, biodiversity protection for limiting artificial lights, etc.

There is increasing research into the role of policies in fostering sufficiency, although sufficiency is still in conflict with the ideological orientation of many decision-makers who are reluctant to engage with this idea.

Policies that are viewed as supportive of sufficiency include:

- Energy/resource taxation, especially progressive taxation (at a sufficient level to genuinely trigger behaviour change);
- Personal carbon allowances;
- Phase-out or restrictions on certain highly intensive energy/resource-based services;
- Investments in alternative mobility infrastructures (cycling lanes, etc.);
- Alternative urban planning reducing the need for individual transport means;
- Facilitating building sharing;
- Environmental labelling based on absolute product impacts or progressive indicators (i.e. that become more challenging as product size, capacity or features increases);
- Incentives to encourage sufficiency behaviours and projects, such as financial bonus/malus schemes based on the absolute energy consumption of services;
- Evolutions in public prescriptions (on comfort, lighting, hygiene...) to alter social norms;
- Information, communication, and educational campaigns and tools.

== Limits and challenges ==
=== The discussion around needs, wants and enoughness ===
As it builds on a sense of self and collective moderation in relation to the consumption of energy and material-based services, sufficiency requires drawing a line between wants seen as superfluous and actual justified needs. It triggers potentially complex and contentious theoretical and practical questions. Answers may differ culturally, change with time and context, as well as depend on income and other socio-economic factors.

The issue is not only relevant at the level of individual values, ethics, and lifestyles, but also for public decisions. As an illustration, whereas building or extending an airport was rarely challenged successfully in the past, two recent decisions show this has changed: the decision of the French government to drop the Notre-Dame-des-Landes airport in 2018, and the UK court decision to rule Heathrow's extension illegal over climate change in 2020.

=== Economic impact ===
Sufficiency supposes a moderation in the consumption and development of high energy-based and material-based services, which are often delivered by or associated with goods and equipment. Thus, sufficiency means limitations on current consumption levels of some products and renouncing some types of infrastructures.

A common criticism, shared with the degrowth concept, is that this would hurt economic growth, increase unemployment and lead to social problems. While it is clear that current energy and resource intensive services would be hit by sufficiency, leaner, more local, and employment-intensive activities would also be fostered in the meantime.

There is currently limited research on the macroeconomic impacts of a sufficiency-based society. Notably, there is a lack of understanding of how systematic sufficiency-based business models could be developed and promoted, and how it would change the economic system.

=== Rebound effects ===
A third objection to sufficiency is that, as for efficiency, the energy and material savings could lead to indirect rebound effects.

This suggests that sufficiency should be implemented as comprehensively as possible, to avoid savings in one sector being annihilated by the growing environmental footprint of another. Capping incomes and resource use are strategies that could mitigate rebound effects.

== Research ==
=== Ongoing projects ===
- ENOUGH: the International Network for Sufficiency Research & Policy

This scientific network has been established in 2018 to bring together scientists and experts from around the world and from various fields working on sufficiency. It aims to increase the visibility of the topic, facilitate networking activities and information sharing, and act as a resource centre. It maintains a bibliographical database on sufficiency including hundreds of references and publications.

- FULFILL (Fundamental Decarbonisation Through Sufficiency By Lifestyle Changes) – EU funded Project (2022–2024)

The FULFILL project explores the contribution of lifestyle changes in decarbonising Europe. By examining sufficiency-based habits at the micro, meso and macro levels through social sciences, it discusses enablers and barriers and contributes to a better design of sufficiency policies and sufficiency modelling. The project is supported by the European Union's Horizon 2020 programme.

- 1.5 Degree Lifestyles – EU funded project (2021–2025)

The aim of this EU project is to foster the mainstreaming of lifestyles in accordance with the 1.5 °C aspirational climate target. The project develops guidance for policy makers, intermediary actors and individuals based on scientific evidence on how lifestyle choices affect carbon footprint, and how political, economic and social contexts enable or constrain sustainable lifestyles options. The project involves researchers from Finland, Germany, Hungary, Latvia, the Netherlands, Spain and Sweden, and is funded through the financial support of the European Union's Horizon 2020 programme.

- CLEVER - Collaborative Low Energy Vision for the European Region (2020–2023)

This carbon-neutrality scenario for the EU is developed through a bottom-up approach of national trajectories constructed by 20+ national partners from the academic world, research, or civil society. It includes a strong consideration for energy sufficiency and lifestyle changes to reduce energy demand.

- EDITS Network – IIASA (2020–)

The EDITS network (Energy Demand changes Induced by Technological and Social innovations) brings together experts of various disciplines to regularly discuss and engage in the multi-faceted energy demand research, notably ways to reduce it such as sufficiency. The EDITS community works together based on common interest in interlinked topics, on transferring methodological knowledge, and on exploring modelling innovations across demand-side models.

- ENSU - The Role of Energy Sufficiency in Energy Transition and Society (2021–2026)

This German research project led by a team of young researchers wants to investigate which sufficiency policies are needed in order to enable people to consume less resources and aim at integrating sufficiency options in energy and climate scenarios. The project has organised workshops, published papers, and established the European Sufficiency Policy Database, a collection of hundreds of potential policy measures to foster sufficiency at various levels.

- Living Well Within Limits (LiLi) – University of Leeds (2017–)

This project involves multidisciplinary qualitative and modelling approaches to answer three research questions: What are the biophysical resources required to achieve human well-being? What influence do social and technical systems have on the levels of resource use associated with well-being? If remaining within planetary boundaries requires rapid decreases in resource use, how could these scarce resources best be employed to preserve well-being?

- EHSS – Potentials of and Limitations to Sufficiency Oriented Urban Development – BMBF / FONA (2017–2023)

The transdisciplinary research project explores the conditions for success and obstacles to sufficiency-oriented urban development at the municipal level. The central question is how municipal administrations are (not) able to influence city development so that people can live well while consuming as few resources as possible (focus on housing, mobility and land use). As part of the project, scientists from the University of Flensburg and employees of the City of Flensburg are conducting a real world laboratory on a sufficiency-oriented development of a 54-hectare redevelopment area.

- Consumer sufficiency as a pathway to climate change mitigation – BOKU & Duisburg-Essen University (202–2023)

This project is rooted in Austria and Germany (BOKU and University of Duisburg-Essen), and is about sufficiency and especially consumption reduction communication (with a consumer perspective, involving the disciplines economic psychology/marketing).

- Fair limits – University of Utrecht (2017–2022)

This 5-year project in political philosophy focuses on 'Limitarianism' and 'Sufficientarianism', i.e. the view that there should be upper limits to how much a person could have of valuable goods. The philosophical argumentation is discussed, as well as what 'limitarian' institutions could look like. The team involves five researchers and produced publications, events and blogs during the project.

- Organiser la Sobriété – Ecole Polytechnique and University of Nantes (2020–)

This French research-action programme aims at studying how sufficiency governance may be considered at various levels, and how it can be experienced as a lifestyle change, a new economic model, or a local planning vision. Issues such as limit setting, value creation, and upscaling will be addressed.

- Exploratoire de la sobriété énergétique – university of Caen-Normandie (2023–2026)

This French project involving five research partners is a multidisciplinary observatory of sufficiency and energy saving practices. Surveys and interviews, as well as living lab experiments, will help better understand how consumers react to energy crises and implement sufficiency actions.

- Digital Sufficiency – ZHAW Switzerland

The increasing use of digital media can cause harm to the environment. The interdisciplinary project team aims to reduce the ecological burden by encouraging young people to use media in a way that is lighter on resources.

- Sufficiency Policy in Rural Municipalities – Swiss Federal Institute for Forest, Snow and Landscape Research (WSL)

The research project analyzes how rural municipalities in Switzerland can adopt sufficiency policies and contribute to sustainable development. It examines the potential for sufficiency policies in rural municipalities, the factors that hinder and promote such policies, and how the superordinate political levels can support municipalities in developing and implementing sufficiency policies. (project duration: 2021–2025)

- A Middle Way? Probing Sufficiency through Meat and Milk in China (MidWay) (2022–2027)

The primary objective of the MidWay-project is to probe the concept of sufficiency as a useful organising principle to achieve reduced consumption based on the empirical inputs from meat and milk practices in China. Host Institution for the project is the Norwegian University of Science and Technology, and PI is Associate professor Marius Korsnes.

- Energy communities as multipliers for energy sufficiency – IÖW

The project from Institute for Ecological Economy Research (IÖW), adelphi and Heidelberger Energiegenossenschaften focuses on how energy cooperatives can encourage their members and customers to lead a sufficiency-oriented lifestyle. As a central part of the project, they fostered consumption reduction, time wealth and civic engagement in a field study.

- SlowHeat: heat bodies not building – Belgium (2020–2023)

Exploratory participative research into a human-centered heating system that allows us to live well in our homes. Living with 16, 15, or even 14 °C is possible and comfortable under certain conditions, which the SlowHeat research project aims to describe. Funded by Innoviris (Research administration of the Brussels Region, 2020–2023).

- Sufficiency in the building sector (2022–2023)

The project identifies sufficiency approaches in the building sector and political-legal measures for their strategic anchoring and support, with which potential for reducing greenhouse gas emissions can be exploited in addition to efficiency and consistency strategies. To this end, existing sufficiency approaches and concepts in the building sector will be researched and analyzed, e.g. the optimization of existing use or the adaptability of buildings to changing conditions of use and requirements over the life cycle, for which significant potential for greenhouse gas mitigation and the reduction of further environmental impacts and resource consumption can be demonstrated. For this purpose, current methods of modeling and quantifying sufficiency in climate, energy and resource scenarios will be taken up.

- WEFEL - Wellbeing, energy futures and everyday life (2020–2023) – University of Geneva

The WEFEL project addresses the energy transition through a social practices and wellbeing approach. Energy scenarios are not always relatable to people, and often focused on technological solutions for the future. The aim of the project was to translate energy scenarios into personas from the future that represent what everyday life could look like in Geneva in 2035. The personas were then discussed in participatory workshops (N=142) with consumer-citizen, with three aims: 1) relating the personas to understandings of the good life, through a needs-based approach, 2) discussing trade-offs between energy reduction potentials and the good life, and 3) reflecting on necessary changes, collective and individual, towards the normative goal of the good life in an energy transition. The results demonstrate that people can reflect on social change in the present, moving beyond personal practices towards more collective forms of change that would be necessary for the future.

=== Past projects ===
- Integrating energy sufficiency into modelling of sustainable energy scenarios (2020–2022)

The IntSuf project aimed at integrating knowledge about the social dynamics of energy consumption into energy modelling tools in order to develop sustainable energy scenarios that will be more useful in policy making. The project integrated experiences from European research of sustainable energy practices initiatives into two energy modelling tools and developed modified Danish, Latvian and Lithuanian national sustainable energy scenarios building upon the combination of sufficiency, efficiency and renewable energy.

- EU policy guidance on energy sufficiency – eceee (2017–2020)

This project aimed at promoting the sufficiency concept and sufficiency policies at EU level. Several concept papers have been published (on definitions, rebound effects, sufficiency in buildings, sufficiency in products), and have been discussed at workshops in European cities.

- ENERGISE – EU project (2016–2019)

This project involving 10 European research partners aimed at going beyond existing sustainable consumption research by developing innovative theoretical frameworks fusing social practice and energy cultures approaches. It assessed energy consumption reduction initiatives, investigated the use of Living Lab approaches for transforming energy cultures, and produced new research on the role of routines and ruptures in shifting consumption.

- EUFORIE (European Futures for Energy Efficiency) – EU project (2017–2019)

This project involved four partners (University of Turku, University of Naples, University of Barcelona, and SERI). It aimed at studying energy consumption from different angles and suggested strategies to save energy in various fields. It notably included a report on "Stocktaking of social innovation for energy sufficiency" and a workshop organised in June 2017 on developing the potentials of energy sufficiency.

- Sufficiency in daily life – Swiss project at the Basel University (2016–2019)

This project examined different aspects of sufficiency as a strategy for a '2000 watt' society. Consumer habits, everyday routines, and sufficient lifestyles were investigated. Barriers and sufficiency governance have also been discussed.

- ESADICAS - Socio-anthropologic study on collective acculturation to sufficiency – French project (2018–2020)

This project supported by ADEME aimed at analysing how far innovative collective schemes promoting acculturation to sufficiency may contribute to a widespread participation of consumers to the transition towards sustainability. It involved three French universities (Université de Rouen Normandie, Université de Rennes 1, Université Paris-Est Marne-la-Vallée).

- Digitalization and social-ecological transformation: rebound risks and potential for sufficiency of digital services – IÖW / TU Berlin (2016–2022)

This project examined the social and environmental impacts of the provision and consumption of digital services, through several angles: how digitalization changes energy use (Environmental Engineering), changes in consumption patterns (Psychology), digital sufficiency marketing (Sustainability Marketing), imaginaries and future visions (Social Philosophy). These findings were integrated into post-doc and a professorship research projects.

- Sufficiency in everyday life – Project from Öko-Institut (2012–2013)

This project supported by Stiftung Zukunftserbe investigated sufficiency potentials and strategies in German households. Policy options for sufficiency were then analysed, discussed, and developed in several areas.

- Scenarios for sufficiency and societal changes – Project in the French Hauts-de-France Region (2012–2016)

This project led by the NGO Virage Energie and supported by ADEME and regional authorities aimed at discussing sufficiency potentials at the level of a French region in collaboration with academic partners. Two reports were published: one focusing on sufficiency modelling in food, material goods, buildings, and mobility (2013), the other added considerations about barriers, social innovation approaches, and socio-economic impacts of sufficiency-based strategies (2016).

- Sobriétés – French local project (2010–2013)

This interdisciplinary research project supported by the French Hauts-de-France Region and ADEME was led by Lille University and aimed at institutionalising energy sufficiency strategies at the regional and local level. It contributed to structuring a network of regional actors who reconsidered regional energy policies under a new light.

- SuPraStadt I – Ifeu, ISOE, FH Dortmund (2019–2022)

SuPraStadt stands for quality of life, participation and resource conservation through social diffusion of sufficiency practices in urban neighborhoods. The project focused on transdisciplinary cooperation with three real laboratories with three different lead actors: a civil society initiative in Heidelberg, the municipality in Dortmund and a housing industry company in Kelsterbach. The initiative for the conception, implementation and diffusion of sufficiency practices originated significantly from these lead actors and the implementation of their initiatives has already begun.
