= Index of sustainability articles =

This page is an index of sustainability articles.

== A ==
Adiabatic lapse rate - Air pollution control - Air pollution dispersion modeling - Airborne wind turbine - Allotment (gardening) - Anaerobic digestion - Anthropogenic - Anthroposystem - Anti-consumerism - Applied Sustainability - Appropriate technology - Aquaculture - Aquatic ecosystem - Ashden Awards

== B ==
Back-to-the-land movement - Bagasse - Behavioral ecology - Bicycle-friendly - Biobutanol - Biodegradable plastics - Bioenergy - Bioenergy village - Biofuel in Brazil - Biofuel in the United States - Biofuel - Biogas - Biogas powerplant - Biogeochemistry - Bioswale - Blue bag - Blue roof - Bottle recycling - Bright green environmentalism

== C ==
Car-free city - Carbon accounting - Carbon economy - Carbon footprint - Catchwater - Causal layered analysis - Center for Environmental Technology - Centre on Sustainable Consumption and Production - Circles of Sustainability - Circular economy - Circular fashion - Clean technology - Cleaner production - Climate change - Coal depletion - Commission on Sustainable Development - Compost - Composting - Computational Sustainability - Confederation of European Environmental Engineering Societies - Conservation biology - Conservation Commons - Conservation development - Conservation ethic - Conservation movement - Consumables - Cornucopian - Corporate social responsibility - Corporate sustainability - Cradle to Cradle Design - Cultural sustainability - Cultured meat - Cyclability - Cycling advocacy - Cycling infrastructure

== D ==
Deep energy retrofit - Deforestation - Demography - Depopulation - Desertification - Directive on the Promotion of the use of biofuels and other renewable fuels for transport - Diseases of poverty - Downsizer - Drawbridge mentality - Durable good

== E ==
Earth Charter - Earth observation satellite - Earthscan - Eco hotels - Eco-cities - Eco-efficiency - Ecohouse - Eco-industrial park - Eco-sufficiency - Ecoforestry - Ecolabel - Ecological deficit - Ecological economics - Ecological engineering - Ecological footprint - Ecological humanities - Ecological literacy - Ecological sanitation - Ecological threshold - Ecologically sustainable development - Ecosharing - Ecosystem-based management - Ecosystem management - Ecotax - Ecotechnology - Ecotourism - Ecovillages - Electric vehicle - Emissions trading - Energy conservation - Energy conversion efficiency - Energy content of biofuel - Energy crop - Energy density - Energy descent - Energy development - Energy economics - Energy efficiency implementation - Energy recovery - Energy recycling - Efficient energy use - Energy Policy Act of 2005 - Energy saving modules - Energy security - Environmental accounting - Environmental archaeology - Environmental audits - Environmental benefits of vegetarianism - Environmental biotechnology - Environmental Change Network - Environmental chemistry - Environmental concerns with electricity generation - Environmental consulting - Environmental control system - Environmental defense - Environmental design - Environmental design and planning - Environmental disaster - Environmental determinism - Environmental economics - Environmental effects on physiology - Environmental engineering - Environmental enterprise - Environmental ethics - Environmental factor - Environmental finance - Environmental geography - Environmental geology - Environmental gradient - Environmental hazard - Environmental health - Environmental impact assessment - Environmental impact of aviation - Environmental impact of fashion - Environmental impact of fishing - Environmental impact report - Environmental Information Regulations 2004 - Environmental journalism - Environmental justice - Environmental law - Environmental Life Force - Environmental management - Environmental management scheme - Environmental Measurements Laboratory - Environmental medicine - Environmental microbiology - Environmental Modeling Center - Environmental Modification Convention - Environmental movement - Environmental movement in New Zealand - Environmental movement in the United States - Environmental planning - Environmental preservation - Environmental pricing reform - Environmental protection in Japan - Environmental psychology - Environmental Quality Improvement Act - Environmental racism - Environmental racism in Europe - Environmental remediation - Environmental Research Letters - Environmental restoration - Environmental Risk Management Authority - Environmental science - Environmental security - Environmental skepticism - Environmental sociology - Environmental standard - Environmental studies - Environmental suit - Environmental Sustainability Index - Environmental technology - Environmental Technology Laboratory - Environmental Technology Verification Program - Environmental toxins and fetal development - Environmental transport association - Environmental vandalism - Environmental vegetarianism - Environmental, Safety and Health Communication - Environmentalism - EPA Sustainability - Epidemics - Ethanol fuel - Ethical consumerism - Eugenics - European Biofuels Technology Platform - Externalities of cars

== F ==
Factory Green - Famine - Farmer field school - Floating solar - Floating wind turbine - Food Race - Food Routes Network - Food security - Food, Conservation, and Energy Act of 2008 - Foreshoreway

== G ==
Gasification - Geothermal energy - Geothermal heating - Geothermal power - Global Environment Outlook - Global Reporting Initiative - Global warming - Glossary of climate change - Glossary of environmental science - Green anarchy - Green banking - Green brands - Green building - Green cities - Green cleaning - Green computing - Green conventions - Green crude - Green development - Green energy design - Green gross domestic product - Green infrastructure - Green museum - Green Revolution - Green roof - Green syndicalism - Green transport hierarchy - Ground-coupled heat exchanger

== H ==
Hannover Principles - Heat recovery steam generator - Heat recovery ventilation - Heating oil - Health and environmental effects of transport - Holocene extinction event - Hubbert Peak Theory - Human development index - Human development theory - Human migration - Humanistic capitalism - Hybrid vehicle - Hydroelectricity - Hydropower - Hydrogen economy - Hydrogen-powered aircraft - Hydrogen-powered racing - Hydrogen-powered ship - Hydrogen technologies - Hydrogen train - Hydrogen vehicle

== I ==
Immigration - Immigration reduction - Impact investing - Import substitution industries - Inclusive business - Industrial biotechnology - Industrial ecology - Industrial symbiosis - Industrial wastewater treatment - Inhabitat - Integrated catchment management - Integrated Multi-trophic Aquaculture - International Institute for Environment and Development - International Year of Forests

== J ==
Joint Forest Management

== K ==
Kyoto Protocol

== L ==
Langkawi Declaration - Life cycle assessment - Lifeboat ethics - Linear park - List of climate change topics - List of conservation topics - List of environmental degrees - List of environmental health hazards - List of environmental issues - List of environmental studies topics - List of global sustainability statistics - List of large wind farms - List of low-energy building techniques - List of religious populations - List of renewable energy topics by country - List of sustainability programs in North America - List of vegetable oils - Local food - Low impact development - Low-carbon economy - Low-energy house

== M ==
Maldevelopment - Marine energy - Marine current power - Material efficiency - Material input per unit of service - Medieval demography - Megalopolis (city type) - Melbourne Principles - Metapattern - Micro hydro - Micro-sustainability - Mitigation of peak oil - Multiple chemical sensitivity

== N ==
Natural building - Natural resource management - Nature conservation - Net metering - New Classical Architecture - New Urbanism - Noise pollution

== O ==
Ocean thermal energy conversion - Oceanway - Offshore wind power - Outline of sustainable agriculture - Over-consumption

== P ==
Pallet crafts - Participatory technology development - Passive solar building design - Peak coal - Peak copper - Peak gas - Peak oil - Peak uranium - Pedestrian village - Permaculture - Permeable paving - Photovoltaic array - Photovoltaics in transport - Pico hydro - Planetary boundaries - Population ageing - Population biology - Population control - Population decline - Population density - Population ecology - Population growth - Population pyramid - Promession - Public ecology

== R ==
Radical sustainability - Rain garden - Rainwater tank - Rechargeable battery - Reconciliation ecology - Reclaimed lumber - Recycling - Reef Check - Remanufacturing - Renewable energy development - Renewable energy - Renewable heat - Renewable resources - Repurposing - Rio Declaration on Environment and Development - Risks to civilization, humans and planet Earth - Roof garden - Rooftop solar power - Reuse

== S ==
Seafood watch - Self-sufficiency - Seven generation sustainability - Silicon Valley - Simple living - Small hydro - Small wind turbine - Smithsonian Environmental Research Center - Soil conservation - Soil erosion - Soil health - Solar cell - Solar heating - Solar lamp - Solar panel - Solar power - Solar power satellite - Solar savings fraction - Solar vehicle - Spaceship earth - Space sustainability - Steady-state economy Straight vegetable oil - Strategic Environmental Assessment - Strategic Sustainable Development - Street reclamation - Sustainability - Sustainability accounting - Sustainability appraisal - Sustainability governance - Sustainability (journal) - Sustainability organisations - Sustainability reporting - Sustainability science - Sustainability Strategies - Sustainability studies - Sustainable advertising - Sustainable agriculture - Sustainable architecture - Sustainable art - Sustainable building - Sustainable business - Sustainable city - Sustainable community - Sustainable design - Sustainable development - Sustainable development in Azerbaijan - Sustainable distribution - Sustainable energy - Sustainable fashion - Sustainable food system - Sustainable forest management - Sustainable gardening - Sustainable habitat - Sustainable industries - Sustainable landscape architecture - Sustainable lighting - Sustainable living - Sustainable national income - Sustainable packaging - Sustainable population - Sustainable procurement - Sustainable product development - Sustainable product development and design - Sustainable refurbishment - Sustainable regional development - Sustainable resource extraction - Sustainable sanitation - Sustainable technology - Sustainable tourism - Sustainable transport - Sustainable urban drainage systems - Sustainable urban infrastructure - Sustainable urbanism -

== T ==
Tasmanian House - The good life - The Institution of Environmental Sciences - The Natural Step - The People & Planet Green League - The Science of Survival - Thermal efficiency - Thermal power station - Tidal barrage - Tidal power - Timber recycling - Tidal stream generator - Tragedy of the commons - Transition town

== U ==
United Nations Environment Programme - United States Green Chamber of Commerce - Upcycling - Urban density - Urban horticulture - Urban oasis - Urban reforestation - Urban forest - Urban forest inequity - Urban forestry - Urban green space - Urban prairie - Urban sprawl - Urban vitality -

== V ==
Value of Earth - Variable retention - Vegetable oil economy

== W ==
Walkability - Walking audit - Walking city - Waste management - Waste-to-energy - Waste vegetable oil - Waste water treatment - Water conservation - Water crisis - Water efficiency - Water heat recycling - Water purification - Water recycling shower - Wave farm - Wave power - Weak and strong sustainability - Wind-assisted propulsion - Wind farm - Wind power - Wind power in the United Kingdom - Wind-powered vehicle - Wind turbine - Wind turbine installation vessel - Windmill ship - World energy consumption - World's largest cities

== Z ==
Zero-carbon city - Zero-energy building - Zero waste - Zero-waste fashion

== See also ==
- List of environmental issues
- Lists of environmental topics
- List of conservation topics
