= Outline of environmental studies =

Overview of and topical guide to environmental studies

The following outline is provided as an overview of and topical guide to environmental studies:

Environmental studies – multidisciplinary academic field which systematically studies human interaction with the environment. Environmental studies connects principles from the physical sciences, commerce/economics, the humanities, and social sciences to address complex contemporary environmental issues. It is a broad field of study that includes the natural environment, the built environment, and the relationship between them.

== Fields of study ==
- Aquatic and environmental engineering
- Biomimetics (Biomimicry)
- Climatology
- Conservation biology
- Conservation movement
- Ecocriticism
- Ecological economics
- Ecological engineering
- Ecological genetics
- Ecological humanities
- Ecological literacy
- Ecological psychology
- Energy and environment
- Energy conservation
- Environmental archaeology
- Environmental chemistry
- Environmental degradation
- Environmental design
- Environmental economics
- Environmental effects on physiology
- Environmental engineering
- Environmental ethics
- Environmental finance
- Environmental geography
- Environmental geology
- Environmental history
- Environmental impact assessment
- Environmentalism
- Environmental issues
- Environmental justice
- Environmental law
- Environmental management
- Environmental monitoring
- Environmental movement
- Environmental organization
- Environmental philosophy
- Environmental psychology
- Environmental policy
- Environmental protection
- Environmental racism
- Environmental remediation
- Environmental restoration
- Environmental science
- Environmental sociology
- Environmental soil science
- Environmental studies
- Environmental technology
- Environmental toxicology
- Geomatics
- Green chemistry
- Green computing
- Green economy
- Green engineering
- Landscape architecture
- Natural resource management
- Fishing
- Hunting
- Hydrology
- Oceanography
- Pollutant
- Pollution
- Renewable energy
- Renewable resource
- Restoration ecology
- Sustainability science
- Sustainability studies
- Toxicology
- Traditional environmental knowledge
- Waste management
- Waste minimisation
- Whaling
- Wildlife conservation
- Wildlife management
- Wildlife observation

== Degrees ==
Primary undergraduate and graduate degrees in Environmental studies include the following.

Bachelors

- Bachelor of Arts in Environmental Studies BA 4sem
- Bachelor of Environmental Studies (BES)
- Bachelor of Science in Environmental Studies (BS)

Masters

- Master of Arts in Environmental Studies (MA)
- Master of Professional Studies in Environmental Studies (MPS)
- Master of Science in Environmental Studies (MS)

Doctoral

- Doctor of Philosophy in Environmental Studies (PhD)

== Environmental education institutions and organizations ==
Listed here are primary, secondary, and non-degree granting environmental education institutions and organizations.

- Arkansas Environmental Academy
- Canadian Centre for Environmental Education (CCEE)
- Dekalb Academy of Technology and Environment
- Earhart Environmental Magnet Elementary School
- Ecovillage Training Center (in Tennessee in the US)
- Environmental Campus Birkenfeld, Germany
- Environmental Charter High School
- Environmental Law Institute (ELI)
- European Academy of Environmental Affairs
- Fanling Environmental Resource Centre
- Jacobsburg Environmental Education Center
- Jane Goodall Center for Excellence in Environmental Studies
- Jane Goodall Environmental Middle School
- Jennings Environmental Education Center
- Jupiter Environmental Research and Field Studies Academy
- Kings Gap Environmental Education and Training Center
- Lancaster Environment Centre (LEC)
- London Environmental Education Forum (LEEF)
- Merry Lea Environmental Center
- NatureBridge (in California in the US)
- Nolde Forest Environmental Education Center
- Pine Jog Environmental Education Center
- Rachel Carson Center, Environmental Studies Certificate Programme, Munich Germany
- School of Environmental Studies, Minnesota
- School of Social Ecology
- Sigurd Olson Environmental Institute
- Southern Environmental Center
- Subject Centre for Geography, Earth and Environmental Sciences, UK
- Sunnyside Environmental School
- Sustainability Management School (SUMAS) (Switzerland)
- School of Planning and Architecture, New Delhi
- The School for Field Studies (SFS)
- Tokyo Global Engineering Corporation, Japan (global)

== See also ==
- Children's Environmental Exposure Research Study (CHEERS), USA
- Fourth International Conference on Environmental Education (2007), India
- Milthorpe Lecture, Macquarie University, Australia
- National Environmental Education Act (1990), USA
- North American collegiate sustainability programs
- Phase I environmental site assessment, USA
- Environmental groups and resources serving K–12 schools
- IB Group 4 subjects
- Index of environmental articles
- Outline of environmental journalism

Lists

- List of environment research institutes
- List of environmental design degree–granting institutions
- List of institutions awarding Bachelor of Environmental Science degrees
- List of institutions awarding Bachelor of Environmental Studies degrees
- List of years in the environment
  - 2026 in the environment and environmental sciences

Organizations and networks

- Chartered Environmentalist
- Environmental Change Network (ECN)
- Natural Environment Research Council (NERC)
