= Daniel Lyons (disambiguation) =

Daniel Lyons may refer to:

- Daniel Lyons, an American writer
- Daniel Lyons (rower) (born 1958), rower who competed in the 1988 Olympics
- Daniel Lyons (shipwreck), a sunken schooner in Lake Michigan
- Daniel Lyons, co-founder of Factory Green, an eco-friendly clothing and accessories company
- Danny Lyons (1860–1888), a gangster
- Dan Lyons, a CEO of the Centre for Animals and Social Justice in the UK

== See also ==
- Daniel Lyon (disambiguation)
