= Bachelor of Environment =

A Bachelor of Environment degree is an undergraduate degree that may refer to:

- Bachelor of Arts with a major in Environmental Studies
- Bachelor of Environmental Design
- Bachelor of Environmental Science
- Bachelor of Environmental Studies
- Bachelor of Environmental Studies and Science
