= Lisbon Principles =

Six sustainability principles

In 1997, a core set of six principles was established by ecological economist Robert Costanza for the sustainability governance of the oceans. These six principles became known as the "Lisbon Principles": together they provide basic guidelines for administering the use of common natural and social resources.

- Principle 1: Responsibility. Access to environmental resources carries attendant responsibilities to use them in an ecologically sustainable, economically efficient, and socially fair manner. Individual and corporate responsibilities and incentives should be aligned with each other and with broad social and ecological goals.
- Principle 2: Scale-matching. Ecological problems are rarely confined to a single scale. Decision-making on environmental resources should (i) be assigned to institutional levels that maximize ecological input, (ii) ensure the flow of ecological information between institutional levels, (iii) take ownership and actors into account, and (iv) internalize costs and benefits. Appropriate scales of governance will be those that have the most relevant information, can respond quickly and efficiently, and are able to integrate across scale boundaries.
- Principle 3: Precaution. In the face of uncertainty about potentially irreversible environmental impacts, decisions concerning their use should err on the side of caution. The burden of proof should shift to those whose activities potentially damage the environment.
- Principle 4: Adaptive management. Given that some level of uncertainty always exists in environmental resource management, decision-makers should continuously gather and integrate appropriate ecological, social, and economic information with the goal of adaptive improvement.
- Principle 5: Full cost allocation. All of the internal and external costs and benefits, including social and ecological, of alternative decisions concerning the use of environmental resources should be identified and allocated. When appropriate, markets should be adjusted to reflect full costs.
- Principle 6: Participation. All stakeholders should be engaged in the formulation and implementation of decisions concerning environmental resources. Full stakeholder awareness and participation contributes to credible, accepted rules that identify and assign the corresponding responsibilities appropriately.

== See also ==
- Environmental science
- Environmental economics
- Systems ecology
- Ecological economics
- Sustainability science
- Sustainability accounting
- List of environmental organisations
- List of environmental agreements (international)
- List of sustainability topics
- Sustainable development
- Natural resource economics
- Energy economics
- Bioeconomics
- Natural capital
