= ECNS =

ECNS may refer to:

- ecns.cn, the English-language website of the China News Service
- EEG and Clinical Neuroscience Society
- Executive Council of Nova Scotia

== See also ==
- ECN (disambiguation)
