= Milthorpe =

Milthorpe may refer to:

- Milthorpe, Hunters Hill, a heritage-listed residence in Hunters Hill, New South Wales, Australia
- Milthorpe Lecture, a series of public lectures on environmental science held at Macquarie University, Australia

== See also ==
- Millthorpe (disambiguation)
