= Jupiter Community High School =

- Jupiter High School Entrance

Location
- 500 North Military Trail; Jupiter, Florida 33458; United States; 26.9277°N 80.1054°W

Information
- School type: Secondary; Adult Education Public high school
- Established: 1965
- School board: Palm Beach County School District
- Superintendent: Mike Burke
- School number: 0081
- School code: 0081
- Principal: Colleen Iannitti
- Teaching staff: 159.00 (FTE)
- Grades: 9–12
- Age range: 14–18
- Enrollment: 3,047 (2023–2024)
- Average class size: 29
- Student to teacher ratio: 19.16
- Hours in school day: 7:30 am – 2:44 pm
- Classrooms: 85
- Colors: Green and Gold
- Slogan: "Go Warriors!" "One Tribe!"
- Fight song: War Chant
- Athletics: 29 different sports
- Sports: Football; Baseball; Lacrosse; Swim
- Mascot: Warrior (Indian)
- Team name: Warriors
- Rival: William T. Dwyer High School
- National ranking: 1,593
- Test average: A
- Newspaper: Warcry
- Yearbook: Chieftain
- Communities served: Jupiter, Florida; Tequesta, Florida;
- Feeder schools: Jupiter Middle School, Independence Middle School, Watson B.Duncan Middle School
- Website: www.jupiterhighschool.org

Jupiter Community High School, also known as Jupiter High School and JHS, is a Public High School in Jupiter, Florida, United States. JHS is a part of the School District of Palm Beach County and is the northernmost high school in Palm Beach County. There are over 3300 students enrolled in the school. The school's mascot is the Warrior, and the school colors are green and gold.

== History ==
The town of Jupiter was settled in the late 19th century by settlers traveling down the Loxahatchee River. Jupiter was incorporated in 1925, and during the 1930s a two-story school building was constructed for grades 1–12. The first level held lower grades, while high school classes were on the upper level.

The campus now known as Jupiter High School was first built west of Military Trail in 1967 for students of the town of Jupiter. Initially the complex housed grades 7–12, with the high school on the South Campus of the school. As the town's population grew, a middle school—now Jupiter Middle School—was constructed a few miles away in 1983, and the high school encompassed the North and South Campuses.

In June 2001 groundbreaking for a new high school took place. It opened in 2003, costing over $56 million and on August 13, 2003, all students were on one campus for the first time in 20 years. The new high school takes up 12 acres (4.9 ha) and is home to the high school stadium, ball fields, tennis courts and practice fields. It is now 338,000 square feet (31,400 m^{2}), housing 60 classrooms and 28 laboratories, as well as new athletic facilities. The school is wired for computers in every classroom. The auditorium seats 850 and the gymnasium seats about 1,500 people. The school is facing overcrowding due to its popular state-of-the-art magnet programs and electives.

== Academics ==
Jupiter High School is host to a wide variety of Magnet school programs, accredited by the State of Florida Department of Education. They include the Jupiter Environmental Research and Field Studies Academy, Engineering Technology Academy, Medical Academy, and the Criminal Justice Academy. In addition to magnet programs the school also offers 30 AP courses, and a wide variety of fine arts, and diverse academic electives.

== Clubs and extracurricular activities ==
Jupiter High School is host to over 100 registered student organizations. Many of Jupiter High School's clubs have competed and won at State and National levels such as: lacrosse, rugby, softball, baseball, flag football, debate, drama, the competitive robotics team, state-ranked marching band, and the nationally ranked table tennis team. The marching band, Spirit of Jupiter won the championship title for class 3A in 2014 and 2021 and for class 4A in 2015 and 2016 at the Florida Marching Band Championships. The Winterguard won 4th place in class Elite A at the 2015 Winter Guard International championships in Dayton, Ohio. The table tennis team has won state and national acclaim from various sources.

In 2023 the JHS chorus was selected to perform at Disney's candlelight service at epcot in Orlando Florida.

== Student Government Association ==
The Student Council of Jupiter Community High School has a dominant presence at the Florida Association of Student Councils, and has been recognized accordingly. The members have won more project awards in more categories than any other school in the state of Florida. For the 2011–2012 school year, Jupiter High has been elected President of the Palm Beach County Association of Student Councils.

== Notable alumni ==
- Andy Abad, former Major League Baseball player
- Kevin Barnes, lead member of band Of Montreal
- Dante Bichette, former Major League Baseball player
- David O. Blanchard, atmospheric scientist and tornado expert
- Matt Bosher, former National Football League punter for Atlanta Falcons
- Tyler Cameron, appeared on "The Bachelorette" and former FAU football player
- Todd Crannell, NFL and entertainment agent
- Kellie Gerardi, astronaut, aerospace professional and popular science communicator
- Miles Mikolas, MLB pitcher for the St. Louis Cardinals
- Kevin O'Sullivan, University of Florida head baseball coach
- Craig Page, former National Football League player for Dallas Cowboys
- Cody Parkey, Cleveland Browns NFL kicker
- Julia Salazar, New York State Senator for the 18th district and the first member of the Democratic Socialists of America to serve in New York's state legislature
- 1900Rugrat, rapper

== Gallery ==
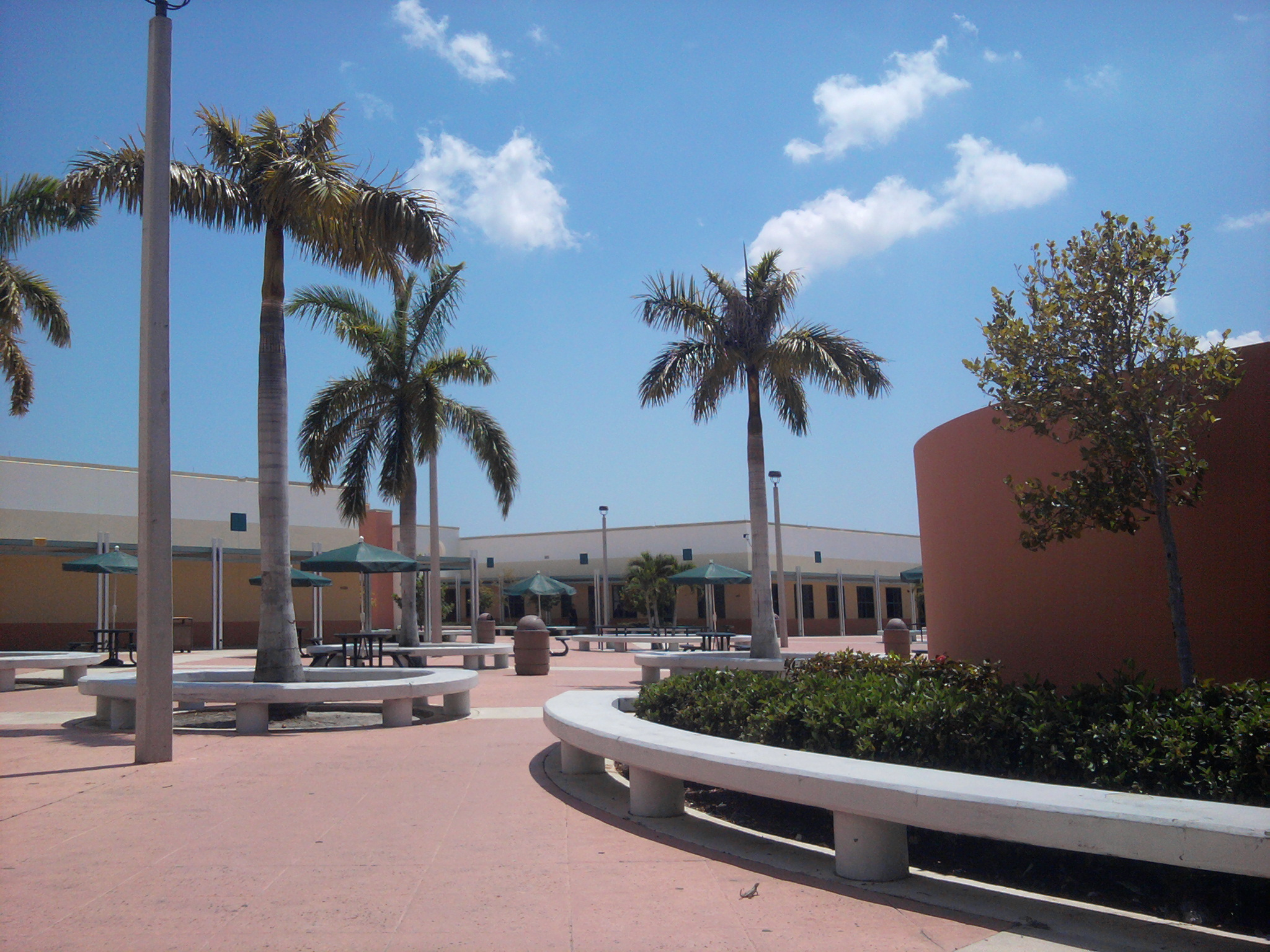
Jupiter High School Courtyard, April 2012

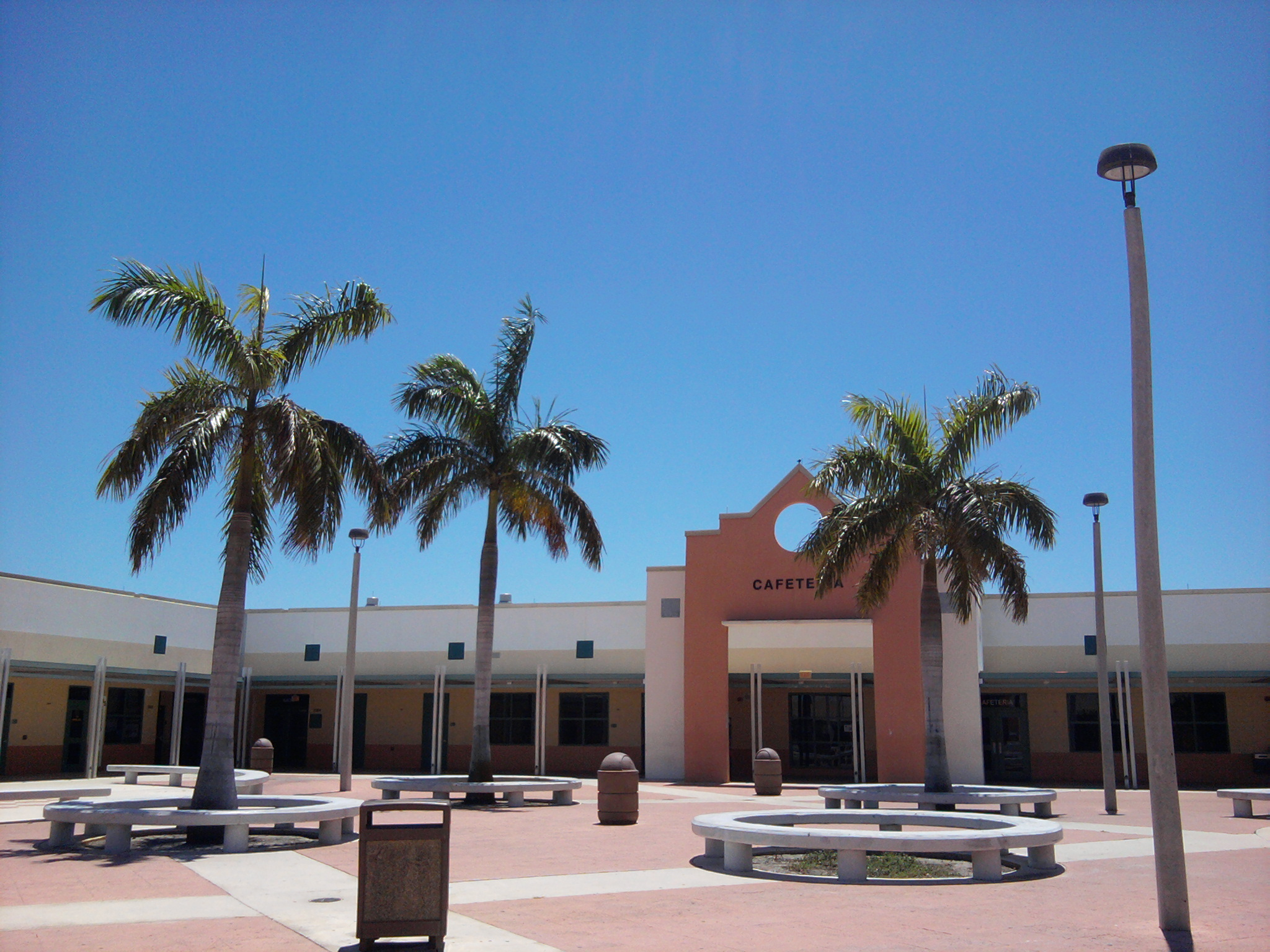
Interior of campus, April 2012
