= ECN =

ECN may refer to:

== Organizations and companies ==
- ECN (TV station), former name of NEN, in New South Wales, Australia
- ECN Capital, a Canadian financing company
- Electoral Commission of Namibia
- Energy Research Centre of the Netherlands (Dutch: Energieonderzoek Centrum Nederland)
- Environmental Change Network, of the British Natural Environment Research Council
- Ercan International Airport, in Northern Cyprus
- European Competition Network
- European Crowdfunding Network

== Science and technology ==
- Electrochemical noise, fluctuations of current and potential

=== Computing ===
- Electronic communication network, for trading of financial products
- Explicit Congestion Notification, in network congestion
- Encoding Control Notation, a formal language that is part of the Abstract Syntax Notation One
- Ethernet Consist Network, protocol used in train communications

== Other uses ==
- Engineering change notice, used to implement changes to components or products
- Enhanced capital note, a fixed-income instrument
- Eastman Color Negative, a photographic processing system
