= Cal Niday =

- Nationality: (United States) American
- Born: April 29, 1914
- Died: February 14, 1988 (aged 73) Lancaster, California, U.S.

Formula One World Championship career
- Active years: 1953 – 1955
- Team(s): Kurtis Kraft, Stevens
- Championships: 0
- Wins: 0
- Podiums: 0
- Pole positions: 0

Calvin Lee Niday (April 29, 1914 – February 14, 1988) was an American racing driver who competed in open-wheel events from the late 1930s through the 1950s. Born in Turlock, California, Niday overcame the amputation of his left leg — suffered in a motorcycle accident during his youth — to build a career that spanned midget car racing in the United States and Australia, three starts at the Indianapolis 500, and decades of vintage racing. He is recognized as the first driver to wear a Bell Racing helmet at the Indianapolis 500, doing so in 1955, and credited the helmet with limiting the severity of head injuries he sustained in a fiery crash that nearly ended his life. Niday is one of three drivers known to have competed in the Indianapolis 500 with a prosthetic leg, along with Al Miller and Bill Schindler. He died on February 14, 1988, from injuries sustained when he was thrown from his car during a vintage midget car event at Willow Springs International Raceway.

== Early life ==
Calvin Lee Niday was born on April 29, 1914. He developed a passion for speed early in life and was an accomplished football player in high school, reportedly earning a scholarship offer from the University of Washington. Outside of sport, he pursued his interest in speed through roadster and motorcycle racing.

Niday lost his left leg in a motorcycle accident during his late teens. Accounts of the incident differ. One version, drawn from his obituary in the Los Angeles Times, states that the crash occurred while he was returning from a football game, forcing him to abandon his college plans. Another account places the incident in 1937 during his time with a motorcycle daredevil group. Most biographical sources describe him losing his leg around age 17 or shortly after completing high school. Following the amputation, Niday was fitted with a wooden prosthetic leg, which he used for the rest of his life.

== Early career ==
After losing his leg, Niday worked briefly as a barber in San Francisco before returning to the world of motorcycles. In 1937, he joined the Hollywood Hell Riders, a motorcycle stunt group, performing despite his prosthesis. Through the motorcycle community, Niday served as president of the Southern California Motorcycle Club and developed friendships with Hollywood actors including Ward Bond and Clark Gable.

Niday subsequently transitioned to automobile racing, initially working as a pit crew member for midget car driver Duane Carter, preparing cars and joining Carter on barnstorming tours. He soon progressed to driving and rapidly gained recognition in Southern California by setting midget-car time-trial records.

== Midget racing ==
Niday became a competitive midget car driver in the United States before traveling to Australia, where the cars were known as speedcars. He won the 1947 and 1948 Australian midget-car season championship titles. At the 1948 Australian Speedcar Grand Prix, held at Sydney Showground Speedway, Niday won the race outright — the third running of that event.

== Indianapolis 500 ==
The Indianapolis 500 was included in the FIA World Championship of Drivers from 1950 through 1960; drivers competing at Indianapolis during those years were credited with World Championship participation. Niday made three Indianapolis 500 starts between 1953 and 1955, driving for teams fielding Kurtis Kraft and Stevens chassis, but scored no World Championship points.

In 1953, driving the No. 99 Kurtis Kraft entry, Niday qualified at 136.096 mph (18th fastest) and started 30th, but retired after 30 laps due to magneto failure. In 1954 he recorded his best result: qualifying second fastest at 139.828 mph in the No. 24 Stevens, starting 13th, completing all 200 laps, and finishing 10th. In 1955, driving the No. 22 Kurtis Kraft-Offenhauser, he qualified fourth fastest at 140.302 mph and started ninth.

=== 1955 crash and the Bell helmet ===
The 1955 Indianapolis 500 was already a tragic race following the fatal crash of two-time defending champion Bill Vukovich on lap 56. Niday was among the top contenders late in the event when, on approximately lap 170, the front axle of his car cracked. He struck the wall in Turn 4 and his car bounced into the infield in flames. He suffered severe burns, a punctured diaphragm and lung, and a skull fracture. Niday remained unconscious for three weeks and spent four months hospitalized, dropping below 100 pounds by the time of his discharge.

Niday had been wearing a Bell helmet — the first Bell Racing helmet ever worn at the Indianapolis Motor Speedway. Roy Richter of Bell Auto Parts had begun manufacturing hard-shell fiberglass racing helmets in 1954 under the name "the 500." Niday credited the helmet with limiting the severity of his head injuries. The attention his accident brought to the new helmet helped fuel rapid growth in Bell Racing's sales, and the crash is considered a significant moment in the history of motorsport safety.

Bell Racing's official corporate history states: "Cal Niday becomes the first driver to wear a Bell Helmet in the Indianapolis 500."

Cal Niday — Indianapolis 500 results
Year	Car	Start	Qual (mph)	Speed rank	Finish	Laps	Led	Reason out
1953	99	30	136.096	18th	30th	30	0	Magneto
1954	24	13	139.828	2nd	10th	200	0	Running
1955	22	9	140.302	4th	16th	170	0	Crash, Turn 4

== Later career ==
After recovering from his 1955 injuries, Niday relocated to Hawaii in 1957, where he opened a high-performance sports car engine and muffler shop called Speed 'N Sport. He built and raced cars on the islands for approximately 13 years, remaining active in local motorsport through 1970. In 1972, he moved to Port Hueneme, California, and continued building and rebuilding race cars.

In his later years, Niday competed in vintage sprint and midget car events, where he was respected as a consistent top competitor despite racing with a prosthetic leg. From 1986 to 1987, he served as president of the Western Racing Association, an organization of approximately 330 vintage-car racing enthusiasts dedicated to exhibition events with historic vehicles.

== Death ==
On February 14, 1988, Niday was killed at the age of 73 during a vintage sprint and midget car exhibition at Willow Springs International Raceway in Rosamond, California. The event was organized by the Western Racing Association on the facility's 3/8-mile dirt oval. While racing a single-seater midget car, Niday attempted to avoid a spinning car; the resulting contact caused his vehicle to flip, throwing him from the car. He was transported to Antelope Valley Hospital Medical Center in Lancaster, California, and was pronounced dead approximately two hours later. The official cause of death was listed as multiple trauma.

His wife, Elsie, who was present at the event, said: "He was doing what he wanted to do. That was his life. He loved racing from the time that he was a little boy." Western Racing Association member Walt James offered tribute: "He would come out with one leg and compete with everyone and do so well. He really was a respected driver, always a top competitor. He would have never quit. He was always ready to go racing."

== Complete World Drivers' Championship results ==
(The Indianapolis 500 counted toward the FIA World Championship of Drivers from 1950 to 1960.)

Year	Entrant	Chassis	Engine	1	2	3	4	5	6	7	WDC	Points
1953	Kurtis Kraft	Kurtis Kraft KK500A/B	Offenhauser 4	ARG	IND; 30	FRA	GBR	GER	SWI	ITA	NC	0
1954	Kurtis Kraft	Kurtis Kraft KK500A/B	Offenhauser 4	ARG	IND; 10	BEL	FRA	GBR	GER	SWI	NC	0
1955	Stevens	Stevens	Offenhauser 4	ARG	MON	IND; Ret	BEL	NED	GBR	ITA	NC	0

(key)

== Sources ==
- Bagnall, Art (June 1990). Roy Richter: Striving For Excellence.
- "Race Car Driver with One Leg Dies After Crash". Los Angeles Times. February 18, 1988.
- "Vintage Car Racer Killed at Willow Springs". Los Angeles Times. February 16, 1988.
- "Cal Niday". Motorsport Memorial.
- "The Talk of Gasoline Alley". WIBC. May 13, 2003.
- "Cal Niday". Bell Racing US.
- "#Bell70 Episode 1: From a small garage to the Indy 500". Bell Racing US. November 27, 2024.
- "Cal Niday". OldRacingCars.com.
- "Cal Niday — Driver Stats". Indianapolis Motor Speedway.
