= Energy-absorbing barrier =

Structures designed to absorb and dissipate kinetic energy during vehicle impacts

An energy-absorbing barrier is a type of safety barrier designed to dissipate and reduce the kinetic energy of a vehicle during an impact. These systems are used in motorsport, road safety, and civil engineering to minimise injury risk to occupants and damage to vehicles and surrounding structures.

== Overview ==
Energy-absorbing barriers are engineered to deform or compress under impact, converting a portion of a vehicle's kinetic energy into heat and mechanical deformation.

The purpose of the Barriers is to stop a vehicle as safely as possible. In motorsport and roadway applications, this is achieved by helping to slow down vehicles in a controlled manner while preventing rebound back into the path of traffic or racing lines.

In addition to protecting drivers, the barriers help protect spectators and property from high-speed collisions and debris.

The performance of an energy-absorbing barrier depends on material composition, geometry, and anchoring. Common design goals include:

- Reducing peak deceleration forces on vehicle occupants
- Preventing vehicle penetration or launch
- Providing predictable deformation characteristics
- Allowing for rapid replacement after impacts

== Types ==
Energy-absorbing barriers are built using different materials and technologies depending on the application and cost.

=== Motorsport barriers ===
In motorsport, impact barriers are essential for driver and spectator safety, and are regulated by the Fédération Internationale de l'Automobile (FIA) and other governing bodies. Examples include:

- Tecpro barrier: modular high-density polyethylene (HDPE) and foam blocks designed for FIA Grade 1 circuits and Formula One street tracks
- SAFER barrier: “Steel And Foam Energy Reduction” system using steel tubes and foam blocks, primarily used in NASCAR and IndyCar oval circuits
- Tire barrier: stacked and strapped tyres historically used at circuits worldwide for energy dissipation
- Guardrail and Armco barrier: layered steel rails absorbing and deflecting impact forces

The FIA and circuit designers select barrier types based on speed zones, impact angles, and available runoff space.

=== Roadside barriers ===
On public highways, energy-absorbing structures are installed to reduce collision severity with fixed objects such as bridge supports or medians. Examples include:

- Crash cushions or impact attenuators made of aluminium honeycomb, sand barrels, or hydraulic dampers
- Guardrails and tension cable barriers for redirecting vehicles
- Concrete barriers with deformable joints or composite inserts

Many of these designs originate from technologies developed in motorsport and later adapted for road use.

== Operation ==
The force a vehicle exerts on a crash barrier depends on several factors, including the vehicle type, its weight, and its speed at the moment of impact. Because barriers must absorb and resist these substantial forces to ensure safety, they are typically constructed from galvanised steel. They are also often secured in place using either bolt-down or dig-in posts to maintain stability during collisions. However, this can vary depending on the location and type of event they are being used in.

When a vehicle collides with an energy-absorbing barrier, energy is dissipated through:

- Material deformation: compression, bending, or fracturing of the structure
- Friction and heat: generated as materials slide and compress
- Progressive resistance: through modular or multi-stage elements that deform sequentially

This prevents abrupt deceleration, helping to reduce occupant injury and vehicle intrusion.

== Development and research ==
The evolution of energy-absorbing barriers has paralleled advances in materials science and crash analysis. Early motorsport barriers relied on straw bales or stacked tyres. Since the late 20th century, manufacturers and research institutions have focused on synthetic polymers, foams, and hybrid composites offering consistent and predictable energy absorption.

Crash testing by the FIA, NHTSA, and other organisations evaluates barrier performance using high-speed impact simulations. Data from racing incidents, such as the 2001 Blaise Alexander accident (which led to wider adoption of the SAFER Barrier) and the 2020 Romain Grosjean crash in Bahrain (which validated Tecpro barrier performance), continue to inform improvements in design.

== Comparison of major systems ==
Barrier type	Typical application	Material	Key feature	Introduced
Tire barrier	General motorsport	Rubber tires, straps	Simple, low cost	1950s
SAFER barrier	Oval racing	Steel tubes, foam blocks	Fixed to concrete wall	2002
Tecpro barrier	FIA circuits, street tracks	HDPE and energy foam	Modular, reconfigurable	2006
Crash cushion	Public roads	Metal, foam, hydraulic	Redirects or absorbs impacts	1970s

== See also ==
- Motorsport safety
- Sustainable motorsport
- Crash testing
