= GAIA (journal) =

- Discipline: Environmental science, sustainability science
- Language: English, German
- Edited by: Gaia Association

Publication details
- History: 1992–present
- Publisher: oekom verlag
- Frequency: Quarterly
- Open access: Yes
- License: Creative-Commons-licence 4.0 Attribution
- Impact factor: 1.875 (2019)

Standard abbreviations
- ISO 4: GAIA

Indexing
- ISSN: 0940-5550
- LCCN: 94640130
- OCLC no.: 57378075

Links
- Journal homepage; Online access at IngentaConnect; Online archive

GAIA: Ecological Perspectives for Science and Society (Gaia: Ökologische Perspektiven für Wissenschaft und Gesellschaft) is a peer-reviewed academic journal established in 1992. Its main focus is on inter- and transdisciplinary research on and for sustainability transformations. Since 2001 it is published by oekom verlag. Articles are in English and German. The current editor-in-chief is Irmi Seidl (Swiss Federal Institute for Forest, Snow and Landscape Research WSL, Birmensdorf, CH). GAIA follows the Green Road to Open Access: Authors can archive their article for free public use on personal websites and/or in any open access repository immediately after publication (no embargo period). Authors retain copyright: All articles are published under the terms of the Creative Commons Attribution license CC BY 4.0. Additionally, GAIA offers GAIA Hybrid Option: With this option authors can publish their articles with full open access against a basic charge.

== Sections ==
The journal contains the following sections:

- Magazine: reporting on ongoing environmental and sustainability research, environmental policy, and research promotion
- Forum: original papers, including essays, expressions of opinion, and reactions to articles that have appeared in recent issues
- Research: original scientific articles about environmental and sustainability research
- Books: reviews of new publications

== Masters Student Paper Award ==
In 2014 the GAIA Masters Student Paper Award was established. It recognizes outstanding results from young scientists in the field of environmental and sustainability research. The prize is awarded in cooperation with the Selbach-Umwelt-Stiftung and Dialogik gGmbH.

== Abstracting and indexing ==
The journal is abstracted and indexed in:

- CAB Abstracts
- Cambridge Scientific Abstracts
- Current Contents/Social & Behavioral Science
- Current Contents/Agriculture, Biology & Environmental Sciences
- EBSCO databases
- GeoRef
- ProQuest databases
- Science Citation Index Expanded
- Scopus
- Social Sciences Citation Index

According to the Journal Citation Reports, the journal has a 2025 impact factor of 2.4.
