= List of environmental degrees =

This is a list of environmental degrees, including for such Various disciplinary fields as environmental science, environmental studies, environmental engineering, environmental planning, environmental policy, landscape architecture, sustainability science and studies, etc., at both undergraduate and graduate levels.

== Bachelors ==
=== Bachelor of Arts ===
- Bachelor of Arts in Environmental Studies

=== Bachelor of Science ===
- Bachelor of Science in Environmental and Sustainability Studies
- Bachelor of Science in Environmental Engineering
- Bachelor of Science in Environmental Science(s)
- Bachelor of Science in Environmental Science and Policy
- Bachelor of Science in Environmental Studies
- Bachelor of Science in Landscape Architecture (BSLA)
- Bachelor of Science in Sustainability

=== Other ===
- Bachelor of Environmental Design (BEnvD)
- Bachelor of Environmental Science (BEnvSc)
- Bachelor of Environmental Studies (BES)
- Bachelor of Landscape Architecture (BLA)
- Bachelor of Resource and Environmental Planning (BREP)

== Masters ==
=== Master of Arts ===
- Master of Arts in Environmental Policy
- Master of Arts in Environmental Studies
- Master of Arts in Geography and Environmental Planning
- Master of Arts in International Environmental Policy
- Master of Arts in Sustainability Studies
- Master of Arts in Urban and Environmental Policy and Planning

Master of Education

- Master of Education in Environmental Education

=== Master of Professional Studies ===
- Master of Professional Studies in Environmental Science
- Master of Professional Studies in Environmental Studies

=== Master of Public Administration ===
- Master of Public Administration in Environmental Policy
- Master of Public Administration in Environmental Science
- Master of Public Administration in Environmental Science & Policy

=== Master of Science ===
- Master of Science in Economics and Policy of Energy and the Environment
- Master of Science in Environmental Applied Science and Management
- Master of Science in Environmental Engineering
- Master of Science in Environmental Planning
- Master of Science in Environmental Planning and Management
- Master of Science in Environmental Policy
- Master of Science in Environmental Studies and Resource Management
- Master of Science in Environmental Science
- Master of Science in Environmental Sciences and Policy
- Master of Science in Environmental Sciences, Policy and Management
- Master of Science in Environmental Studies
- Master of Science in Regenerative Studies
- Master of Science in Sustainability
- Master of Science in Sustainability Science
- Master of Science in Sustainability Management
- Master of Science in Systems Ecology

=== Other ===
- Master of Environmental Management (MEM)
- Master of Environmental Planning (MEP)
- Master of Environmental Planning and Design (MEPD)
- Master of Environmental Policy (MEP)
- Master of Environmental Policy and Management (MEPM)
- Master of Environmental Science (MEnv or MEnvSc)
- Master of Environmental Science and Management (MESM)
- Master of Environment and Sustainability (MEnvSus)
- Master of Landscape Architecture (MLA)
- Master of Philosophy in Human Ecology (M.Phil.)
- Master of Resource Management (MRM)
- Master of Sustainability (MSus)
- Master of Sustainable Solutions (MSuS)
- Master of Urban and Environmental Planning (MUEP)
- Professional Science Master of Environmental Policy and Management (PSM)
- Sustainable Masters in Business Administration (MBA)

== Doctoral ==
=== Doctor of Philosophy ===
- Doctor of Philosophy in Environment and Sustainability
- Doctor of Philosophy in Environmental Applied Science and Management
- Doctor of Philosophy in Environmental Policy
- Doctor of Philosophy in Environmental Science
- Doctor of Philosophy in Environmental Science and Management
- Doctor of Philosophy in Environmental Studies
- Doctor of Philosophy in Sustainability Science
- Doctor of Philosophy in Sustainable Development

=== Other ===
- Doctor of Environmental Management (DEM)
- Doctor of Environmental Science and Engineering (DESE, or D.Env.)
- Professional doctorate in Environmental Science and Engineering (D.Env.)

== See also ==
- List of master's degrees
- Outline of environmental studies
- List of sustainability programs in North America
