= Millthorpe =

Millthorpe may refer to:

- Millthorpe, Derbyshire, England
- Millthorpe, Lincolnshire, England
- Millthorpe, New South Wales, Australia
  - Millthorpe railway station
- Millthorpe School, York, England

== See also ==
- Milthorpe (disambiguation)
