= Craig Page =

American football player (born 1976)

No. 62
- Position: Center

Personal information
- Born: January 17, 1976 (age 50); Jupiter, Florida, U.S.
- Listed height: 6 ft 3 in (1.91 m)
- Listed weight: 303 lb (137 kg)

Career information
- High school: Jupiter
- College: Georgia Tech
- NFL draft: 1999: undrafted

Career history
- Tennessee Titans (1999–2000)*; Dallas Cowboys (2000); Atlanta Falcons (2002)*; St. Louis Rams (2003)*
- * Offseason or practice squad member only

Awards and highlights
- Consensus All-American (1998); First-team All-ACC (1998)
- Stats at Pro Football Reference

Warren Craig Page (born January 17, 1976) is an American former professional football player who was a center in the National Football League (NFL) for the Tennessee Titans and Dallas Cowboys. He played college football for the Georgia Tech Yellow Jackets, earning consensus All-American honors in 1998.

== Early life ==
Page attended Niceville High School, before moving on to Jupiter High School, where he played defensive tackle. As a junior, he tallied 80 tackles and 7 sacks, receiving All-district, All-conference and All-area honors.

As a senior, he registered 91 tackles and 10 sacks, while receiving All-state and Defensive Player of the Year (Palm Beach Post) honors.

== College career ==
Page accepted a football scholarship from the University of Louisville, playing defensive tackle as a freshman. In 1995, he transferred Georgia Tech and sat out the season under NCAA transfer rules.

He was converted into a Center and became a starter as a sophomore. As a senior, he received All-American honors and won the Jacobs Blocking Trophy, as the top blocker in the Atlantic Coast Conference. He finished his eligibility with several team strength records.

== Professional career ==
=== Tennessee Titans ===
Page was signed as an undrafted free agent by the Tennessee Titans after the 1999 NFL draft on April 21. He was waived on August 25 and signed to the practice squad on September 7. On January 14, he was promoted to the active roster for the playoffs, but was declared inactive in those games.

On August 26, 2000, he was waived and later signed to the practice squad on August 29.

=== Dallas Cowboys ===
On November 23, 2000, he was signed by the Dallas Cowboys from the Titans practice squad, to provide depth after Mark Stepnoski was lost for the season with a knee injury. He and appeared in two games. He was released on September 2, 2001.

=== Atlanta Falcons ===
On January, 11, 2002, he was signed as a free agent by the Atlanta Falcons. He was cut on September 1.

=== St. Louis Rams ===
On January, 7, 2003, he signed with the St. Louis Rams as a free agent. He was cut on August 31.
