= Daniel Lyon =

Daniel Lyon may refer to:

- Super Dragon, real name Daniel Lyon
- Danny Lyon, American photographer and filmmaker
- Daniel Lyon (musician), vocalist/guitarist in Pomegranates (band)

== See also ==
- Daniel Lyons (disambiguation)
