= Andy Abad =

American baseball player (born 1972)

- First baseman
- Born: August 25, 1972 (age 53); West Palm Beach, Florida, U.S.
- Batted: Left Threw: Left

Professional debut
- NPB: April 7, 2000, for the Kintetsu Buffaloes
- MLB: September 10, 2001, for the Oakland Athletics

Last appearance
- NPB: August 27, 2000, for the Kintetsu Buffaloes
- MLB: April 13, 2006, for the Cincinnati Reds

NPB statistics
- Batting average: .163
- Home runs: 4
- Runs batted in: 13

MLB statistics
- Batting average: .095
- Home runs: 0
- Runs batted in: 0
- Stats at Baseball Reference

Teams
- Kintetsu Buffaloes (2000); Oakland Athletics (2001); Boston Red Sox (2003); Cincinnati Reds (2006)

Fausto Andrés Abad (born August 25, 1972) is an American former professional baseball player. Listed at 6 ft 1 in (1.85 m), 184 pounds (83 kg), Abad batted and threw left handed. He is also known as Tulile (to-lee'-leh) in the Dominican Republic.

Born in West Palm Beach, Florida, he is of Cuban descent as his father left Cuba during the Fidel Castro revolution. Before being drafted, he graduated from Jupiter High School in Florida, and then attended Middle Georgia College.

== Professional career ==
Abad was selected by the Boston Red Sox in the 16th round (443rd overall) of the 1993 Major League Baseball draft. He made his debut with the Gulf Coast Red Sox that year.

In 1994 he advanced to Single-A Sarasota Red Sox, where he hit .288. He remained in Sarasota through part of 1995, advancing to Double-A Trenton Thunder for whom he hit .240.

He was sent back down to Single-A Sarasota in 1996, and hit .287 for them before rejoining Trenton, where he batted .277.

In 1997 he hit .303 in 45 games for Trenton, while collecting the first of multiple .300-plus seasons.

Abad opened 1998 with Triple-A Pawtucket Red Sox, where he hit .307 with 16 home runs and stole 10 bases. The next season, he hit 15 home runs and again posted 10 steals, but was released on October 15, 1999.

In between, Abad had three productive seasons for the Navegantes del Magallanes of the Venezuela Winter League between 1996 and 1999 and also played in the Caribbean Series.

He then went overseas, joining the Kintetsu Buffaloes of the Nippon Baseball League in 2000. Following the season, the Oakland Athletics signed him to a contract. He started with their Triple-A club, the Sacramento River Cats, where he had one of his best minor league seasons, hitting .301 with 19 homers and 92 runs batted in in 124 games. He then batted a .529 average during the 2001 Pacific Coast League playoffs.

Abad made his debut with Oakland late in September, appearing as a pinch hitter for Jeremy Giambi, resulting in a pop fly out. It was his only plate appearance of the year.

After the 2001 season, Abad was granted free agency and later signed with the Florida Marlins. He spent 2002 with their Triple-A affiliate, the Calgary Cannons.

In 2003, he returned with Boston and was assigned to Triple-A Pawtucket, where he posted a .304 average with 13 homers and 93 RBI in 124 games. He made both the International League and Baseball America All-Star teams that season.

He returned to the big leagues during the regular season for a little more than a week with the Red Sox. Appearing in nine games, he hit just .118 in 17 at-bats.

Abad was picked up by the Pittsburgh Pirates in 2004. He hit .292 and 15 home runs with their Triple-A team Nashville Sounds. He was then released, and subsequently signed by the Cleveland Indians in 2005. He played the entire season with Triple-A Buffalo Bisons, collecting a .293 average with 85 RBI and a career high 20 home runs. At the end of the season, he was voted the team co-MVP along with Ryan Garko.

In 2006, Abad signed with the Cincinnati Reds and was included in the opening day 25 man roster. He went 0-for-3 with two walks in only five games and was demoted to Triple-A Louisville Bats, where he hit .267 with nine home runs and 32 RBI in 83 games. He was granted free agency and later signed by the Milwaukee Brewers in 2007. He then was assigned to the Nashville Sounds, for whom he hit .316 in 269 at-bats.

Abad became a free agent before the 2008 season. He was signed by the Pericos de Puebla of the Triple-A Mexican League. After playing 30 games for them, he was released in late April.

Abad also appeared as an emergency pitcher in six minor league seasons spanning 1994–2007. He posted a 3.86 earned run average in seven games, allowing four runs on 12 hits and one walk, including two homers, while striking out four batters in 10 innings of work.

== Coaching career ==
In 2008, Abad was named the hitting coach for the Yakima Bears, a Low-A affiliate of the Arizona Diamondbacks organization. He later started worked as a roving instructor for the Philadelphia Phillies in 2010. He currently is a Defensive Coordinator for the Outfield in player development for the Phillies.

He currently resides in Jupiter, Florida.
