= Tecpro barrier =

Barrier system in motorsports

The Tecpro barrier is an energy-absorbing barrier system used in motorsport circuits to improve driver and spectator safety.

The barrier system was developed by TecPro International, a French manufacturer of safety systems for motorsport circuits, in the early 2000s. The system was found to be more effective than the traditional tyre barriers that were previously in place.

Tecpro was then approved and implemented by the Fédération Internationale de l'Automobile for use in FIA-approved circuits throughout the mid-2000s. The system has since become widely adopted following successful crash testing and FIA homologation in 2006.

== Overview ==
Tecpro barriers are modular, interlocking blocks made primarily from high-density polyethylene (HDPE) filled with foam and weighted ballast. Each block is designed to dissipate kinetic energy resulting from high-speed impacts, ultimately reducing the force transmitted to drivers and as a result minimise the risk of the vehicle rebounding onto the circuit and causing further injury to other competitors.

Due to their design, the barriers are often situated in large runoff areas where space is limited. They are also often used in conjunction to other types of barriers in street circuits.

== Design ==
Each Tecpro module measures approximately 1.2 m (3.9 ft) in height and 1 m (3.3 ft) in width, with a variable length depending on circuit configuration. The barrier's construction consists of four main components designed to work together as a single impact-absorbing system.

=== External shell ===
The external shell forms the visible outer structure of the barrier. Each unit is constructed from high-density polyethene (HDPE), a material chosen for its combination of flexibility and strength. The shell is engineered to retain its shape under stress, preventing fragmentation or debris during an impact. This durable casing serves as the barrier's first line of defence, helping to contain and redirect the energy of the crash while protecting both the vehicle and the driver from secondary hazards caused by broken components.

=== Internal energy foam ===
Inside the shell is a dense, energy-absorbing foam core that manages the majority of the impact force. When struck, the foam compresses and gradually disperses kinetic energy across a larger surface area, reducing the peak load experienced by the vehicle and its occupant. By absorbing and redistributing this energy, the barrier significantly lowers the risk of serious injury associated with high-speed impacts. Together, the foam and shell form a composite system that deforms in a controlled manner, ensuring consistent and predictable crash performance.

=== Anchoring system ===
Each Tecpro barrier module is connected to its neighbours using a system of interlocking couplers and ground anchors that keep the array stable during collisions. The connectors are designed to allow limited movement between sections, helping to spread impact energy along the barrier wall rather than concentrating it at a single point. This modular approach also allows sections to be replaced quickly after an incident without dismantling the entire installation. On permanent circuits, barriers are secured to embedded anchor points in the tarmac or concrete, while on temporary street circuits, removable ground plates and brackets are used to ensure the system can be installed and dismantled efficiently.

=== Ballast ===
Certain track configurations or high-speed zones may require additional ballast within the barrier modules to enhance stability. These weights are typically composed of sand, water, or proprietary fillers placed inside designated internal chambers. The added mass helps prevent the barrier from sliding or lifting upon impact, particularly in areas where the run-off space is limited or where cars may strike the barrier at shallow angles. Because the ballast is optional and adjustable, race organisers can fine-tune the barrier's response characteristics to suit local conditions, ensuring optimal energy absorption and consistent performance across a variety of racing environments.

When connected in sequence, the modules act as a continuous deformable barrier capable of absorbing impacts at speeds exceeding 200 km/h (120 mph).

== History ==
The Tecpro barrier was developed in the early 2000s by the French company TecPro International, founded by French entrepreneur and former karting driver Rafael Galiana. Its development was largely driven by growing concerns over circuit safety in high-speed motorsport.

By the late 1990s, the Fédération Internationale de l'Automobile (FIA) and other governing bodies were reassessing the effectiveness of existing impact protection systems, particularly the traditional tyre walls and metal guardrails that had been used for decades. Although these structures provided basic cushioning, they often absorbed energy inconsistently, caused cars to rebound dangerously onto the circuit, and required lengthy repairs after heavy collisions.

A series of high-profile accidents underscored the need for improvement. Notable examples include:

- Michael Schumacher's 1999 crash at Silverstone,
- Jacques Villeneuve's accident at the 1998 Spanish Grand Prix, and
- Dale Earnhardt Sr.’s fatal crash at Daytona in 2001.

Each incident drew renewed attention to the limitations of conventional barrier technology and prompted international motorsport regulators to prioritise safer, more energy-absorbing solutions.

In the wake of these events, the FIA expanded its safety research and established the FIA Institute for Motor Sport Safety to coordinate the development of new circuit technologies. The institute's testing programmes encouraged engineers and manufacturers to design modular barriers capable of dispersing impact forces more predictably and efficiently. Within this context, TecPro International introduced a deformable barrier system constructed from high-density polyethylene and energy-absorbing foam technology that would later be homologated for FIA use and deployed at circuits worldwide.

TecPro barriers made their Formula One debut at circuits such as the Circuit de Monaco in 2006, where they replaced many of the traditional tyre walls used in previous decades.

Since then, TecPro systems have been installed at numerous major venues including Circuit de Spa-Francorchamps, Yas Marina Circuit, and Baku City Circuit. They have since become standard at most modern FIA Grade 1 circuits and have been widely adopted in series such as Formula E, the World Endurance Championship, and various national racing categories.

The barriers continue to evolve, with newer generations featuring improved modular coupling systems, enhanced foam density, and optional ballast compartments to accommodate differing circuit layouts and impact conditions.

From 2020s, TecPro barriers are fully homologated by the Fédération Internationale de l'Automobile (FIA) for use at Grade 1-3 circuits and are listed among the organisation's approved energy-absorbing systems. For lower-speed categories, such as FIA Grades 4–6, the installation of TecPro or other modular energy-absorbing barriers is optional and applied at the discretion of circuit inspectors, depending on vehicle type, circuit configuration, and impact risk level.

TecPro International has since remained one of the FIA's officially recognised suppliers of impact-absorbing barrier technology, alongside manufacturers of systems such as the SAFER barrier used in North America.

== Use in Formula One ==
Tecpro barriers are required at all FIA Grade 1 circuits and are strategically placed at high-speed corners, braking zones, and wall-lined sections of street tracks. They are particularly valued for their modularity and quick replacement during race weekends.

== Use in Motorcycle Racing ==
In motorcycle racing, the Fédération Internationale de Motocyclisme (FIM) permits TecPro modules only on a conditional basis at shared venues, typically in conjunction with inflatable air-fence barriers. While TecPro's high-density modular design offers excellent energy dissipation for vehicles, FIM standards continue to prioritise softer air-fence systems to better accommodate the sliding and tumbling dynamics of motorcycle crashes.

Whilst TecPro barriers are deployed at select FIM-approved circuits that host both car and motorcycle events, including Misano World Circuit Marco Simoncelli, Lusail International Circuit, and Circuit de Barcelona-Catalunya, they are not the first crash barrier of choice for motorcycle racing. This is because motorcycle impacts involve sliding and tumbling dynamics, which require longer, softer deceleration zones. The rigid, modular structure of TecPro can create a higher rebound risk for riders compared to inflatable air-fence systems, which deform more progressively under lower-mass impacts.

For this reason, FIM circuit safety standards continue to prioritise Airfence or similar inflatable barrier systems for primary use, with TecPro modules occasionally installed as secondary protection in low-speed corners, service-road exits, or wall-lined sections of shared circuits. In these scenarios, TecPro barriers are often combined with an air-fence layer to meet FIM impact and deceleration requirements.

== Comparison with the SAFER barrier ==
The Tecpro system performs a similar safety role to the SAFER barrier used in North American oval racing, though the two designs were developed independently. The SAFER barrier consists of steel tubes backed by foam blocks and is permanently mounted to a circuit's concrete wall, making it suitable for high-speed ovals such as those used in IndyCar and NASCAR.

In contrast, the Tecpro barrier is a modular assembly of polyethylene blocks with internal energy- absorbing foam which provides a more portable solution. Its sections can be removed, repositioned, or rebuilt to suit both temporary street circuits and permanent road courses.

== Maintenance and deployment ==
Tecpro barriers are designed for quick installation and repair. Following an impact, damaged sections can be removed and replaced without significant track downtime. FIA circuit guidelines specify the required placement, anchoring, and inspection procedures for continued certification.

The barriers undergo rigorous testing such as absorbing frontal impacts at over 200 km/h in order to meet specific FIA safety standards.

== See also ==
- SAFER barrier
- Tire barrier
- Motorsport safety
