= David O. Blanchard =

American photographer and meteorologist

Dave Blanchard
- Education: Florida State University (B.S.); Colorado State University (M.S., 1983; Ph.D., 1994)
- Known for: Severe convective storms research
- Scientific career
- Fields: Meteorology, Photography
- Workplaces: National Oceanic and Atmospheric Administration (NOAA)
- Thesis: Jet-induced Inertial Instabilities and the Growth of Mesoscale Convective Systems (1994)

David Owen Blanchard is an American meteorologist, photographer, and storm chaser. He was a significant collaborator in seminal research on tornadogenesis, specifically the importance of baroclinic boundaries, the rear-flank downdraft (RFD) and its thermodynamic characteristics.

== Background ==
Blanchard studied meteorology at Florida State University (FSU) where he earned a B.S. and at Colorado State University (CSU) where he earned a M.S. in 1983 with the thesis Variability of the Convective Field Pattern in South Florida and its Relationship to the Synoptic Flow and a Ph.D. in 1994 with the dissertation Jet-induced Inertial Instabilities and the Growth of Mesoscale Convective Systems. From 1978 to 1980 Blanchard worked at the NOAA National Hurricane and Experimental Meteorology Laboratory (NHEML) in Coral Gables, Florida after which he moved to the Office of Weather Research and Modification (OWRM) in Boulder, Colorado until 1982 when he worked at the Weather Research Program (WRP) until 1988. Blanchard was at the National Severe Storms Laboratory (NSSL) in Boulder from 1998 to 1994, the National Center for Atmospheric Research (NCAR) from 1994 to 1995, and returned to NSSL Boulder from 1996 to 1999. Since 1999 he has been a meteorologist at National Weather Service (NWS) Weather Forecast Offices (WFOs).

Blanchard participated as a team leader for Project VORTEX in 1994-1995 and was co-principal investigator (PI) of subVORTEX during 1997–1998. Blanchard is a Certified Consulting Meteorologist (CCM) by the American Meteorological Society (AMS), served on the AMS Severe Local Storms Committee, an associated editor of Monthly Weather Review, and on the Atmospheric Dynamics Committee of the American Geophysical Union (AGU).
