= North American collegiate sustainability programs =

Overview of collegiate sustainability programs in North America

North American collegiate sustainability programs are institutions of higher education in the United States, Mexico, and Canada that have majors and/or minors dedicated to the subject of sustainability. Sustainability as a major and minor is spreading to more and more colleges as the need for humanity to adopt a more sustainable lifestyle becomes increasingly apparent with the onset of global warming. The majors and minors listed here cover a wide array of sustainability aspects from business to construction to agriculture to simply the study of sustainability itself.

== Canada ==
=== Acadia University ===
Acadia University is located in Wolfville, Nova Scotia, offers an undergraduate major in Environmental and Sustainability Studies. This major gives students the skills they need to make the changes necessary to create a more "sustainable and just society". There are four concentration areas (Sustainable Community Development, Innovation and Entrepreneurship for Sustainability, Environmental Thought and Practice, and Environmental Advocacy, Education, and Activism) and two different degree options (a Bachelor of Arts and a Bachelor of Recreation Management) offered within the major. Additionally, the university is home to the Arthur Irving Academy for the Environment which organizes sustainability programs on the campus.

=== Dalhousie University ===
Dalhousie University in Halifax, Nova Scotia, offers two different majors, Environment, Sustainability, and Society (ESS) and Sustainable Resources and The Environment. Both majors incorporate different outlooks on sustainability. Sustainable Resource and The Environment focuses on managing environments, whereas ESS focuses on changing for the future. Along with these two majors, Dalhousie also has an Office of Sustainability which offers a wide variety of programs focusing on becoming more sustainable that range from transportation to eating sustainably.

=== Trent University ===
Trent University, located in Peterborough, Ontario, offers an undergraduate degree in Sustainable Agriculture and Food Systems as well as a Master of Arts in Sustainability. The Sustainable Agriculture program encompasses the aspects of growing “healthy, sustainable, and affordable food ”. The Masters program delves into the three pillars of sustainability to prepare students to become leaders in sustainable endeavors. In addition, Trent has its own Office of Sustainability that leads several programs including lighting retrofits and the installation of green roofs.

=== University of British Columbia ===
The University of British Columbia offers an Environment and Sustainability major at its Vancouver campus. This major promotes an understanding of the variety of factors that affect life on the planet now and in the future. Some courses that are part of the major include The Global Climate System as well as Environment and Resources. The University of British Columbia also has the Centre for Interactive Research on Sustainability that focuses on creating and implementing solutions to the "challenges of urban development".

== Mexico ==
=== Instituto Tecnológico y de Estudios Superiores de Monterrey (ITESM) ===
Also known as Technologico De Monterrey (In English: Monterrey Institute of Technology), ITESM is based in Monterrey, but actually has thirty-one campuses throughout the country. The institute is offers a major in Sustainable Development Engineering, which focuses on the efficient use of energy and water as well as the management of emissions and the relationship between the environment and society. Some of the classes offered include Industrial Ecology and Sustainable Use of Water. The Sustainable Development Engineering major is offered at their Mexico City, State of Mexico, Monterrey, and Santa Fe campuses.

== United States ==
=== Northeast ===
==== Columbia University ====
Columbia University in New York City offers a Sustainable Development major that focuses on educating students on how to accomplish a sustainable society. Students will take classes from multiple clusters including Sustainable Development Foundation, Basic Disciplinary Foundation, Skills/Action, and Analysis and Solutions to Complex Problems. The university has also developed a Master of Science in Sustainability Management geared towards the role of sustainability in organizations. Columbia is also home to the Earth Institute whose mission is to bring people together to address and overcome some of the most pressing problems facing the Earth and humanity today. The institute also oversees sustainability initiatives for Columbia's campus.

==== Drew University ====
Located in Madison, New Jersey, Drew University offers a major in Environmental Studies and Sustainability. This major studies the current environmental problems facing the world today and provides the skills needed to overcome these problems. Students who take part in this academic program will have an experiential requirement that involves an environmental-related, hands-on experience.

==== Philadelphia University ====
Located in Philadelphia, Pennsylvania, Philadelphia University has both a major and a minor in Environmental Sustainability that prepare students to serve as strategic leaders of environmental initiatives for corporations, communities, and organizations. The courses they offer are diverse and range from Sustainable Technologies for Architecture to the Economics of Sustainability. They also offer a Master of Science in Sustainable Design focusing on green design and the development of net zero carbon buildings.

==== Unity College ====
Unity College in Unity, Maine, offers two sustainability majors. Their Sustainable Energy Management major is both a technical and conceptual major designed to educate students in building sustainable structures that focus on renewable energy. On the other hand, their Sustainable Agriculture major concentrates on teaching sustainable agricultural practices that emphasize local farming and activism when it comes to governmental food policies.

==== Wilson College ====
Located in Chambersburg, Pennsylvania, Wilson College is a women's college that offers two sustainability majors. Business Sustainability and Environmental Management integrates sustainability practices into the business world. Environmental Sustainability focuses more on solving environmental problems. Wilson has a Center for Sustainable Living that works with the Fulton Center for Sustainable Living (which serves as an environmental educational facility as well as a produce farm).

=== Southeast ===
==== Eastern Mennonite University ====
Eastern Mennonite University in Harrisonburg, Virginia, offers a major in Environmental Sustainability. This program focuses on forward-looking sustainability practices and requires students to choose one of two areas of study: Environmental Science Concentration (focuses on traditional environmental sciences) or Environmental and Social Sustainability Concentration (combines concepts from the first concentration and incorporates sociological aspects).

==== Furman University ====
Furman University in Greenville, South Carolina, offers a major in Sustainability science. The focus of this major is to prepare and educate students on how to enhance the long-term quality of life. This program offers nearly 30 different elective courses along with the required coursework. All of the elective courses are broken into three different categories: Environmental Security, Human Security, and Sustainable Production and Consumption. Furman University also has the Sustainability Planning Council (SPC) and the David E. Shi Center of Sustainability, which both focus on promoting sustainability throughout the campus.

==== University of Florida ====
The University of Florida in Gainesville, Florida, offers three different types of majors and minors that incorporate sustainability: Sustainability Studies, Sustainability and the Built Environment, and Sustainable Crop Production and Management. Each major or minor provides a diverse look into sustainability topics, while offering an array of courses from Agriculture and Environmental Quality to Organic & Sustainable Crop Production and from Sustainable Ecotourism Development to Social and Cultural Sustainability. University of Florida also has an Office of Sustainability that has created nine different sustainability programs for the University of Florida including the One Less Car and Tailgator Game Day Recycling programs.

=== Central ===
==== Aquinas College ====
Aquinas College, located in Grand Rapids, Michigan, is one of the first to offer a major and minor in Sustainable Business. Recognizing that businesses have a huge impact on the environment, Aquinas' academic program seeks to educate students in sustainable business practices that not only promote profitability, but environmental and societal well being too. Courses for the major and minor include Sustainable Business Management and Building Social Capital.

==== Baldwin Wallace University ====
Located in Berea, Ohio, Baldwin Wallace University offers a major and minor in Sustainability. This academic program focuses on preparing students to create solutions to the world's current environmental and social problems through courses such as Sustainable Food and Green Business. In addition to their undergraduate program, Baldwin Wallace University also has a Master of Business Administration in Sustainability.

==== Maharishi University of Management ====
The Maharishi University of Management found in Fairfield, Iowa, began its Sustainable Living degree program in 2003, making it a leader in its field. Its Bachelor of Science and minor in Sustainable Living both focus on sustainable community development. Other than implementing hands-on projects and internship opportunities, this program operates on the block system (students focus only on one course per month) and concentrates on the development of consciousness.

==== Minneapolis College of Art and Design ====
The Minneapolis College of Art and Design (MCAD), located in Minneapolis, Minnesota, offers a fully online Master of Arts in Sustainable Design Program. MCAD was the first art and design school with a fully online program in sustainability. The college and program are fully accredited by both the Higher Learning Commission (HLC) and the National Association of Schools of Art + Design (NASAD). The program covers cutting-edge theories to practical applications and leadership strategies, and emphasizes systems thinking, biomimicry, business, lifecycle analysis, and collaboration. Every student completes an independent thesis project and presentation.

==== Northland College ====
Ashland, Wisconsin, is the site of Northland College that offers both a major and a minor in Sustainable Community Development. Both programs are geared toward students who wish to be agents of change for communities in the way of sustainability. Courses include Methods of Sustainable Community Development and Capitalism, Justice, and Sustainability. Northland is one of five colleges that are part of the Eco League (a group of colleges dedicated to the pursuit of sustainability education) and offers a campus sustainability work study program to its students.

==== University of Michigan ====
The University of Michigan in Ann Arbor, Michigan, offers both a major and minor in Sustainable Systems. These programs focus on how to enhance systems so that they're more sustainable using technology and enterprise. Students can choose from over forty different courses in three different clusters: Systems Analysis for Sustainability, Sustainable Design and Technology, and Sustainable Enterprise that cover a broad range of themes (including the built environment, mobility, and food systems). Additionally, the University of Michigan has an Office of Campus Sustainability and includes the Graham Environmental Sustainability Institute.

==== Western Michigan University ====
Western Michigan University has a Sustainabity department.

=== West/Southwest ===
==== Arizona State University ====
The ASU School of Sustainability at Arizona State University in Tempe, Arizona, offers the BA, BS, MA, MS, and PhD in Sustainability. Other degrees offered are the Master of Sustainable Solutions (applied non-thesis program) and the Executive Master in Sustainability Leadership (13-month executive degree). Through the university's online platform, students may also pursue a BA in Sustainability and a Master of Sustainability Leadership degree. It is the first School of Sustainability in the United States, founded in 2006. Several sustainability programs are found in other colleges at ASU, including Business, Engineering, Public Service and Community Solutions.

==== Cal Poly Pomona ====
The Lyle Center for Regenerative Studies at Cal Poly Pomona is one of the oldest sustainability programs in the US, and began granting the Master of Science in Regenerative Studies (MSRS) degree in 2004. MSRS is a unique interdisciplinary program that prepares students to find successful solutions to environmental problems in the 21st century. Undergraduate students at Cal Poly Pomona can also enroll in the Regenerative Studies Minor.

==== Prescott College ====
Prescott College has offered a PhD degree in Sustainability Education using a cohort-based limited-residency model since 2005. Doctoral students complete most of the work offsite in three stages. Foundational coursework in pedagogy, sustainability science, and social science research methods are completed via virtual classroom space. Elective courses are designed by the students and overseen by degreed mentors found by the students. The research work and writing are traditional, with a doctoral committee made up of a chair and two other members, plus an external reader. Each cohort of doctoral students also meets onsite for a week twice per year. Doctoral student work, including dissertation proposals, is highlighted at a Sustainability Symposium held on campus every April.

Prescott College is also home to a MS in Resilient and Sustainable Communities, a MS in Sustainable Food Systems, and an MBA in Sustainability leadership. These asynchronous programs were developed at Green Mountain College as the first online sustainability programs of their kind--the MBA in 2006, the MS in Sustainable Food Systems in 2011, and the MS in Resilient and Sustainable Communities in 2013--and were absorbed by Prescott College after Green Mountain College closed in 2019. The MS programs feature "a bioregional approach to distance education," asking students to apply what they learn online to their own communities and regions. This bioregional approach was originally designed in 2006 for Green Mountain College's MS in Environmental Studies (which also moved to Prescott College); the pedagogical model is described in Laird Christensen' "Teaching Bioregional Perception--At a Distance," in The Bioregional Imagination, edited by Tom Lynch, Cheryll Goltfelty, and Karla Armbruster (Georgia UP, 2012). In addition to grounding their lessons in local case studies, students also get to know other professionals working in their regions through assignments designed to create rich local networks.

== Additional programs ==
Most of the schools above did not start out with a sustainability focused major. Many started with a major that was related to sustainability or a sustainability minor that eventually evolved into the major(s) they have today. Therefore, the following table not only represents colleges that have sustainability related majors and minors but colleges that have a good chance of developing sustainability majors in the future.

Institution	Location	Type of Program Offered	Title of Program
Canada
McGill University	Montreal, Quebec, Canada	Bachelor of Engineering	Bioresource Engineering
University of Western Ontario	London, Ontario, Canada	Bachelor of Engineering	Green Process Engineering
Northeastern United States
Carnegie Mellon	Pittsburgh, Pennsylvania	Minor	Environmental Engineering and Sustainability
College of the Atlantic	Mount Desert Island, Maine	Area of Study	Sustainable Business Sustainable Food Systems
Dickinson College	Carlisle, Pennsylvania	Over 60 Sustainability Courses Offered	Courses Offered
Green Mountain College	Poultney, Vermont	Program (not a major or minor)	Sustainable Agriculture and Food Production
Hartwick College	Oneonta, New York	Living-Learning Community	The Pine Lake Institute For Environmental and Sustainability Studies
Paul Smith's College	Brighton, New York	Bachelor of Science	Natural Resources Sustainability
Pennsylvania State University	University Park, Pennsylvania	Minor	Sustainability Leadership
State University of New York College of Environmental Science and Forestry	Syracuse, New York	Minor	Sustainable Construction
University of Baltimore	Baltimore, Maryland	Bachelor of Arts	Environmental Sustainability and Human Ecology
University of Rochester	Rochester, New York	Minor	Sustainability
Southeastern United States
Berea College	Berea, Kentucky	Minor	Sustainability and Environmental Studies
Catawba College	Salisbury, North Carolina	Major	Environment & Sustainability
Clemson University	Clemson, South Carolina	Bachelor of Science	Soils and Sustainable Crop Systems
Central United States
Rice University	Houston, Texas	Interdisciplinary Program	Shell Center for Sustainability
University of Dayton	Dayton, Ohio	Minor	Sustainability
University of Illinois at Urbana-Champaign	Urbana and Champaign, Illinois	Minor	Environmental Fellows Program Earth, Society, and Environment
