= Motorsport safety =

Safety systems and technologies used in motorsport

Motorsport safety refers to the engineering, technology, and regulations designed to protect competitors, officials, and spectators in motorsport events. Since the early 20th century, continuous improvements in vehicle construction, circuit design, and personal safety equipment have significantly reduced the risks associated with racing.

== Overview ==
Safety in motorsport encompasses multiple disciplines, including vehicle design, driver protection, crash testing, medical response, and circuit management. The governing body of world motorsport, the Fédération Internationale de l'Automobile (FIA), sets and enforces many of the global standards used across racing series.

Modern safety strategies focus on both prevention (reducing accident likelihood) and mitigation (minimising injury when accidents occur). These are achieved through regulations, materials engineering, and data analysis.

== History ==
In the early decades of motorsport, driver protection was minimal, and fatal accidents were common. Helmets were not mandatory until the mid-20th century, and circuits often lacked barriers or runoff areas. From the 1950s onwards, advances in vehicle chassis construction, roll cages, and seat belts began to improve survivability.

The deaths of high-profile drivers such as Ayrton Senna and Roland Ratzenberger during the 1994 San Marino Grand Prix led to sweeping reforms in Formula One and other categories. The FIA Institute for Motorsport Safety and Sustainability was established in 2004 to research and promote safer standards across disciplines.

== Vehicle safety systems ==
Modern race cars integrate multiple technologies designed to protect drivers and reduce accident severity, including:

- Roll cages and reinforced monocoque structures
- Energy-absorbing crash structures and deformable zones
- Fire suppression systems and onboard extinguishers
- ABS and traction control to enhance stability
- Dynamic Stability Control and Electronic brakeforce distribution
- Safety harnesses and HANS devices to reduce neck and spinal injuries
- Onboard medical data recorders and incident sensors

Motorcycle racing employs dedicated rider protection systems such as airbag suits, reinforced helmets, and advanced leathers designed to absorb impacts.

In 2022, FIM regulations mandate the use of approved, autonomous (wireless) airbag systems for all riders in FIM Sprint Circuit Racing championships (including MotoGP, Moto2, Moto3, and others) as of the 2022 season.

== Track and circuit safety ==
Modern circuits are designed with wide runoff areas, Tecpro barriers, and gravel traps to slow vehicles after loss of control. Track marshals, medical teams, and rapid-response vehicles are positioned strategically to intervene in seconds after a crash.

Temporary street circuits use energy-absorbing walls and reinforced fencing to protect both drivers and spectators. The FIA Grade 1 circuit standard outlines minimum requirements for Formula One venues worldwide.

== Personal safety equipment ==
Drivers and riders are required to wear specialized safety equipment, including:

- FIA-approved Helmet
- Fire-resistant clothing (Nomex suits, gloves, and boots)
- HANS or similar restraint systems
- In motorcycles, airbag-equipped racing leathers and gloves

All equipment is rigorously tested to FIA or FIM standards before approval for competition.

== Safety research and innovation ==
The FIA and FIM continuously analyze crash data and commission research into materials and designs. Innovations such as carbon-fiber survival cells, deformable crash barriers, and electronic safety systems like ABS Pro and Dynamic ESA originated from racing and later migrated to road vehicles.

== Sustainable and hydrogen safety ==
With the growth of sustainable motorsport, new safety standards are being developed for electric racing and hydrogen-powered racing. These include protocols for high-voltage isolation, battery fire suppression, and hydrogen containment integrity testing.

== See also ==
- Motorsport technology
- Sustainable motorsport
- Electric racing
- Hydrogen-powered racing
- Automotive safety
- FIA Institute for Motorsport Safety and Sustainability
