= Radical sustainability =

Holistic philosophy of sustainability

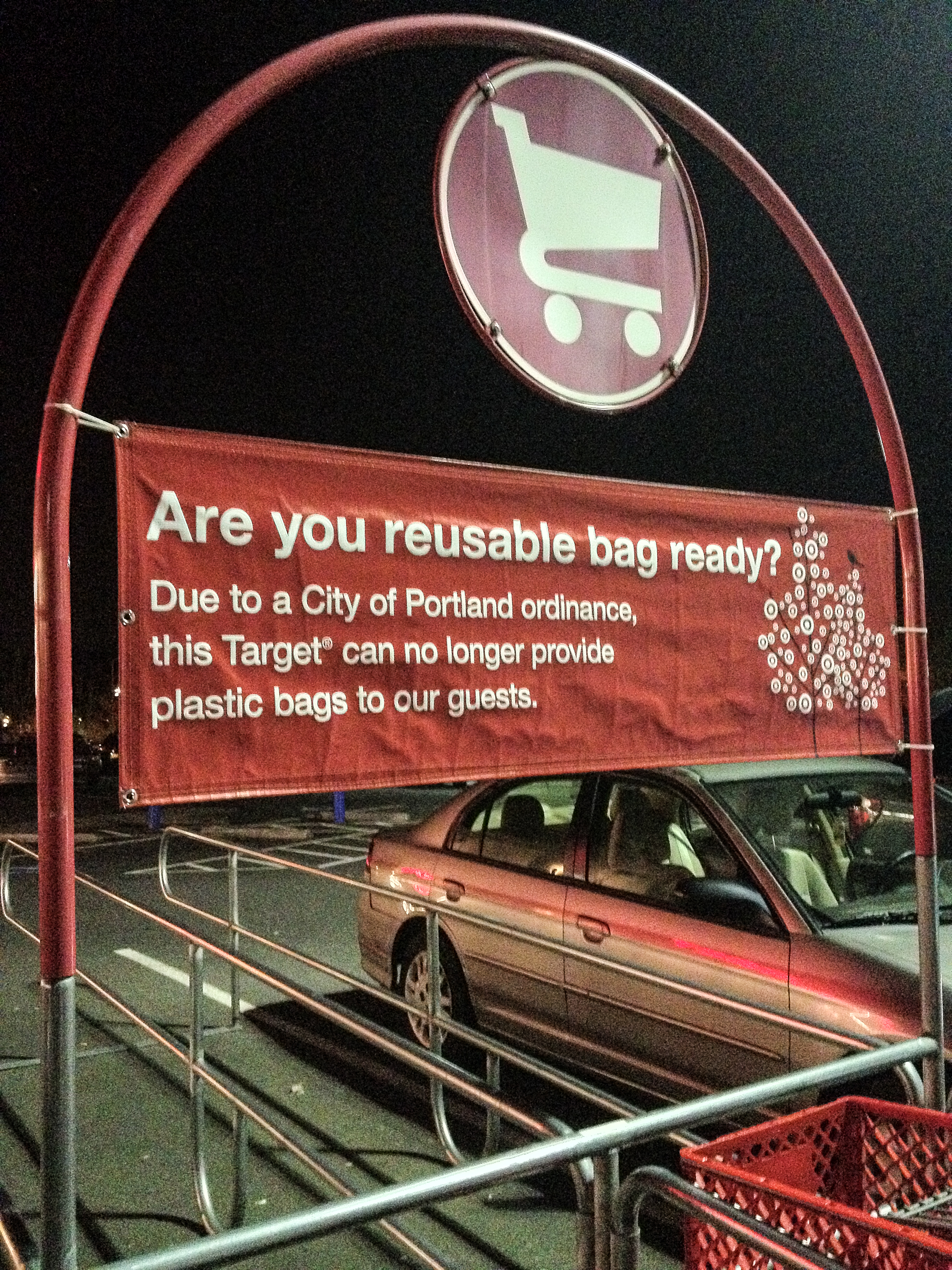
Laws banning plastic bags are ways to solve core issues of plastic emissions.

Radical sustainability is a movement that recognizes the holistic and integrated nature of sustainability, and according to the 2008 publication Toolbox for Radical Sustainable City Living by Scott Kellogg and Stacy Pettigrew, its main purpose is focused on the idea of addressing the root issues, versus their resulting symptoms. Though not a common enough term to be directly mentioned in many organizations or policy, its foundational principles and concepts can be seen in practice across many disciplines such as architecture and design. The term is relatively new, appearing in the last one hundred years, though arguments have been made that the concept has existed throughout human history, affecting industry, social systems, and urbanization long before the term existed. In reflection of this, in recent years, theorists of radical sustainability have pointed to recent policies passed in the United States as examples of this movement's principles becoming more mainstream and accepted in modern practices. The movement is not without its criticism, launching from concern over its potential to incite drastic change in economic and social practices, and the push to enforce this change leading to an oppressive state infringing on personal liberties

== Definition ==
Radical sustainability recognizes that a system is not sustainable if any part of it is unsustainable. Theorists believe the economy cannot be sustained if the underlying social structure is unsustainable, a social structure cannot be sustained if the environment it depends upon is unsustainable, and that the environment cannot be sustained unless proper economical and social practices are in place. A radical sustainability viewpoint focuses on the inseparability of ecological and social issues and the necessity of ensuring the solution to one problem does not create or worsen another. The radical sustainable philosophy looks at sustainability through a bottom-up approach – a form of grassroots sustainability. Radical sustainability advocates and supports autonomous development, indigenous movements, women's rights, social justice and green practices. It has begun to appear in political spheres, and policies in certain cities across the United States reflect many of the tenets of the philosophy. It has faced criticism for the drastic changes it demands in personal lifestyles, as well as its potential ramifications on social and economical systems.

Radical sustainability is a movement that recognizes that for a system to be considered truly sustainable, it must aspire to create a world and community that is environmentally sustainable, economically viable, and socially equitable. It shares much of its platform with radical environmentalism and environmental justice movements. It focuses on addressing the root cause of unsustainable or inequitable practices – such as capitalist systems and systemic racism, rather than addressing what it refers to as the symptoms, citing examples of ineffective practices such as solar panel installation in rural communities and many current marketing strategies employed by corporations and governments alike. It pays special attention to the fact that many implemented solutions may worsen others or create new problems, such as the earlier mentioned example of installing solar panels in a rural community. Radical sustainability claims an action such as this, with no plan for future replacement or repair creates a system of dependency on a corporation or government, and contributes to maintaining colonial mindsets.

== Application ==
The term is often used in reference to sustainable architecture, design, and urban planning. This subset of radical sustainability is strongly supportive of autonomous development, which is looking to pioneer systems that allow the citizens living within and utilizing these systems control over the basic resources involved such as food and water. This group control of necessities is thought to foster communities that are egalitarian and advance quality and social justice. Within larger cities, radical sustainability looks to empower citizens to create change and ensure their cities have the capability to provide such necessities as food, clean water, proper sanitation and waste management, and green energy within their jurisdiction. Radical sustainable change, due to its intense nature, has a difficult time being implemented in urban environments that contain many moving parts. Several barriers have been documented as contributing to this difficulty. This includes the idea of technological lock-in, or the idea that the more a community gets used to and adapts to a technology, the less willing or likely they are to switch to another, regardless of perceived advantage or upgrades. It has roots in economics and the cost of new technology, a trend of aversion to having to learn new technology, and psychology and the uncertainty and perceived distrust of this new technology. It also includes institutional inertia, which is simply the resistance of large institutions to change, and has been blamed for slow progress across climate change and ecological movements as seen in the Moore et al. case study in urban sustainability in Australia.

Radical sustainability can also be seen in business practices and discussions of entrepreneurship and innovation. In this context, radical sustainability refers to drastic, expedient changes, often in human systems such as product and service management. It also deals with the responsibility of sustainable consumption, and business practices that can encourage changes in the consumer's behavior, by accessibility, ease, incentive, or other methods. This is in opposition to the argument of the more gradual incremental change, which while typically seen as the easier type of change to accomplish, is also argued by those who believe in radical sustainability as being not enough to combat ecological changes resulting from current business practices. Some theorists go so far as to argue that sticking to incremental change – where many businesses are comfortable – could even be dangerous.

Indirectly, there have been signs of its use in regulation and policy in recent years as well, so argued by Ben Thomson and Jennie Rommer in their discussion of recent United States policies and supported by the foundations of radical sustainability as proposed by Kellogg and Pettigrew.

== Origin ==
The term sustainability appeared for the first time in the Oxford English Dictionary in the second half of the 20th century. Yet the overall concept of how civilization was impacting the environment can be traced back to a time long before then. The issue surrounding the increasing demand for materials and how this intense need affected the environment can be found throughout history, as early as the ancient civilizations of Egypt and Mesopotamia. As society progressed throughout time and the world saw increasing numbers of the Earth's population and advancements in technology, the idea of a radical form of sustainability was created. At its core, the concept of radical sustainability discusses how to be a sustainable system, it must be sustainable across all components, such as ecology, economy, and equity. All parts must be aligned with one another to ensure that the system is functioning. While the origins of the specific term are not concretely known, the addition to this ancient idea is a modern one that has only been coined in recent years.

== Policy examples ==
=== Austin, Texas ===
One of the most well-known initiatives that the city has incorporated is its climate preparedness. The city recognized the effects of a changing climate on its infrastructure and is working to bring awareness to those most impacted by disastrous weather events, the low-income communities. Because of their few resources to combat the changing environment, they are at high risk of being severely affected by climate change. Austin's goal is to reduce emissions locally and bring attention to the concept of climate preparedness in its jurisdiction, which includes changes like upgrading roads and planting trees to offset potential dangers. They believe this will alleviate the risks of a changing environment for those who do not have the financial means to recover from dangerous weather events.

=== San Francisco, California ===
More specifically, the city is known for its initiative to ban the use of plastic bags. It was the first American city to incorporate a plastic bag ban and encouraged members of the community to use alternative options like reusable totes. Compostable bags also became widely used, which aided in the mission of limiting plastic as they are created from materials that have been recycled. Because of these efforts, the city has restricted around 1.6 million tons of waste from their landfills per year.

== Reception and criticism ==
The movement of radical sustainability has both supporters of the movement along with critics. There are those who note that radical sustainability is accepted as a general vision, indicating a complex process once it is translated to specific goals. Those who believe in the concept acknowledge that implementing radical sustainability would mean significant changes in lifestyle for people of the area. For example, ideas like consolidating land use and using more self-sustaining technologies are prevalent ideals to supporters; however, they acknowledge that these modifications would alter the future of what day-to-day life would look like. Yet, their mission in this movement is to create a more sustainable environment, and they recognize the success of the campaign relies on confronting the already present power of political and economic interests.

Critics of the radical sustainability movement oppose those who support the notion's more optimistic approach. The concerns lie with the ramifications that imposing these new alterations would have on society from an economic and political perspective. Critics have claimed that utilizing sustainable techniques by means of enforcing changes to society as it currently stands enables "risk, irony and jouissance."

== See also ==
- Interdependence
- Green economy
- Ecological economics
- Eco-socialism
