= Ecosharing =

Limiting of one's impact on the biosphere

Ecosharing is an environmental ethic for people to live by: that their own impact on the Earth's biosphere be limited to no more than their own fair ecoshare. The term seems to have been first used by G. Tyler Miller, Jr. in the 1975 edition of his Living in the Environment text. The 1990 book Coming of Age in the Global Village sought to quantify an "ecoshare" by linking it to average world per capita income and energy use. A more modern approach might extend this by also including one's carbon footprint. However it is gauged, an ecoshare is determined by overall assessment of the human impact on the biosphere, computer models of its future condition, and necessary limits imposed by sustainability criteria.

What might the life of someone attempting to live by this ecosharing ethic look like? In Choices We Make in the Global Village --the sequel to his earlier book--Stephen Cook continues the story of his attempt to live a life based on what he calls "Enoughness," and quantitatively connects it with previously defined ecosharing objectives and carbon footprint. Mahatma Gandhi urging "Live simply so that others may simply live" has inspired his lifestyle.
