= Sustainable development in Azerbaijan =

In Azerbaijan, juridical base of realization of the concept of sustainable development has begun to be formed since the second half of the 1990s. More than 20 national laws on different aspects of sustainable development were officially adopted, including Laws ‘On Protection Of Plants’ (03.12.1996), ‘On Keeping Human Health’ (25.07.1997), ‘On Fishing’ (27.03.1998), ‘On Protection Of Environment’ (08.06.1999), ‘On Protecting Animal World’ (08.06.1999), ‘On Environmental Security’ (08.06.1999), ‘On Protection Of Atmospheric Air’ (03.03.2001), ‘On Obligatory Ecological Insurance’ (12.03.2002), ‘On Ecological Education and Enlightenment’ (10.12.2002), ‘On Environmentally Safe Agriculture’ (16.06.2008), etc.
