= Anthroposystem =

The term anthroposystem is used to describe the anthropological analogue to the ecosystem. In other words, the anthroposystem model serves to compare the flow of materials through human systems to those in naturally occurring systems. As defined by Santos, an anthroposystem is "the orderly combination or arrangement of physical and biological environments for the purpose of maintaining human civilization...built by man to sustain his kind." The anthroposystem is intimately linked to economic and ecological systems as well.

== Description ==
Both the anthroposystem and ecosystem can be divided into three groups: producers, consumers, and recyclers. In the ecosystem, the producers or autotrophs consist of plants and some bacteria capable of producing their own food via photosynthesis or chemical synthesis, the consumers consist of animals that obtain energy from grazing and/or by feeding on other animals and the recyclers consist of decomposers such as fungi and bacteria.

In the anthroposystem, the producers consist of the energy production through fossil fuels, manufacturing with non-fuel minerals and growing food; the consumers consist of humans and domestic animals and the recyclers consist of the decomposing or recycling activities (i.e. waste water treatment, metal and solid waste recycling).

The ecosystem is sustainable whereas the anthroposystem is not. The ecosystem is a closed loop in which nearly everything is recycled whereas the anthroposystem is an open loop where very little is recycled. In contrast to the ecosystem, the anthroposystem's producers and consumers are significantly more spatially displaced than those in the ecosystem and thus, more energy is required to transfer matter to a producer or recycler. Currently, a large majority of this energy comes from non-renewable fossil fuels.

Additionally, recycling is a naturally occurring component of the ecosystem, and is responsible for much of the resources used by the system. Under the anthroposystem model, however, recycling does not naturally occur. Outside input is relied on for material and energy supplies, and recycling systems that do exist are artificially created. The process of improving the flow of energy, such that waste can be reused as input resources, is known as industrial ecology.

A matrix can be used to describe the anthropological network of producers, consumers and recyclers and the movement of materials between each.

However, the matrix model of the anthroposystem - based on a model for the ecosystem - fails in acknowledging the physical redistribution of mobilized matter. In developing the anthroposystem model, there is a trade-off between simplicity and completeness. A simple representative model can be created involving only producers, consumers, and recyclers, but this is an open, incomplete system. More components and analogues (such as a matrix that encompasses the producers, consumers and recyclers) can be added to the system to make a more complete model, but the model loses simplicity in the process. Though the anthroposystem concept is flawed in this manner, it is a very good starting point for analyzing human activities and their effects on the environment.

When viewing the Earth as one large anthroposystem, we are essentially eliminating the uncertainty in material flow. All goods (i.e. fossil fuels) will still exist in the system but in a new form (i.e. pollutants). Therefore, the Laws of Conservation of Matter and Conservation of Energy can be applied to analyze how material flow will impact the environment.

Contemporary discussions of the anthroposystem emphasize that modern human activities produce discrete and cumulative changes to Earth's systems. These changes are seen as the result of both intentional and unintentional human actions that constitute a rapidly evolving anthroposystem. Though concerns about such transformation have existed for decades, there are current concerns about their potential irreversibility and whether human intervention can moderate the anthroposystem to sustain ecological and societal stability.
