= Jupiter Environmental Research and Field Studies Academy =

Coordinates: 26.6848°N 80.1124°W

Jupiter Environmental Research and Field Studies Academy [JERFSA]
- Jupiter, Florida; United States

Information
- Type: Magnet school
- Established: 1993
- Founder: Phil Weinrich, Neal White
- School district: Palm Beach County School Board
- Dean: Jessamyn Ramsey
- Grades: 9–12
- Campus: Suburban
- Nickname: JERFSA
- Website: Official website

Jupiter Environmental Research and Field Studies Academy at Jupiter Community High School is a four-year Magnet school program designed to meet the needs of students who wish to pursue an academic curriculum with emphasis on environmental studies.

== History ==
Planning for the Jupiter High School Environmental Research and Field Studies Academy (JERFSA) began during the 1992–93 school year. The recommendation to approve the creation of the academy was submitted in Palm Beach County School Board Report 6G November 4, 1992. JERFSA was started in August 1993 with 75 students, two teachers and funding from the School Board and generous other donations. The first class of 35 students graduated in 1997. Since then the number of students each year has slowly increased and several other staff positions have opened.

== Current status ==
At this time, funds for JERFSA field work are largely provided by parents, student fund raising and assistance from the Partnership for Environmental Education, Inc. The academy currently provides over 75 field activities per year that include cooperative field work with a variety of agencies such as: the Loxahatchee River Environmental Control District, ERM, Busch Wildlife Sanctuary, MacArthur State Park, Jonathan Dickinson State Park, Partnership For Environmental Education, Inc., Palm Beach County Parks & Recreation, Loxahatchee Preserve Nature Center, U.S. Bureau of Land Management and FPL. JERFSA has an Environmental Outreach Program in which students go to elementary schools and present environmental issues utilizing a variety of children's literature materials and field trip opportunities. “Enviroservice” is another Academy program that allows students to work with professionals from a variety of community agencies. Through “Enviroservice” students contribute over two hundred and thirty hours of environmental service every month.

== Curriculum ==
Students in the program enroll in two science courses each year along with other Academy courses. High School courses are taught at the Honors level. College dual enrollment, Advanced Placement (AP), and internships are available to Juniors and Seniors in the academy along with other high school level courses. Students in the Environmental Academy are assigned summer homework and expected to participate in several weekend activities each year.

== Field work ==
As the program name implies, field studies are a large part of the curriculum. The motto of the academy: when one studies environmental science, one must be willing to go into the environment, defines the intent of program leaders. Students of the academy visit and study every major ecosystem in South Florida. Each grade level participates in about fifteen field study activities each year; some of these require overnight and weekend stays. All Academy students participate in regular field activities.

== Goals ==
The Environmental Research and Field Studies Academy aims to equip students with the knowledge and skills that are essential to becoming responsible and productive world citizens. Although, students acquire a strong background in the environmental and earth sciences, graduates of JERFSA pursue a wide range of fields following graduation.
