= Downsizer =

Virtual community of people living sustainably

Downsizer is a virtual community, run on a not-for-profit basis, which describes itself as "a resource for people who want to live more sustainably". Its website includes articles on sustainable living and a popular forum with over 4,500 registered members.

== History ==
The site was set up in October 2004 by the founder members. A year after Downsizer's establishment, the Essex Chronicle remarked on the site's growth, observing that it had "tapped into an increasing awareness and interest in the impact our lives have on the environment". It has continued to grow, and has over 4,500 users registered on its forum as of July 2011.

== Content ==
Downsizer.net is a not-for-profit online community, a resource for people who want to live more sustainably. Like-minded individuals can visit the forums to discuss matters of self-sufficiency and sustainability amongst other things. The website also includes many articles related to downsizing issues including the following:

- Growing Fruit and Vegetables
- Raising Livestock
- Recipes, Preserving, Homebrewing / Winemaking
- Foraging
- Energy, Efficiency, and Construction
- Fishing, Shooting, and Trapping
- Recycling and Conservation

== Reviews ==
The website received a positive assessment from Alison Cork in The Observer, who commented on the variety of topics discussed by members and concluded, "Whether you're an individual wanting to live a more sustainable lifestyle or a small business trying to get an appreciative market for your ethical product or service, you'd be hard pushed not to find something of interest."

A more negative stance was taken by Steve Lowe and Alan McArthur, authors of Is It Just Me Or Is Everything Shit? (2005). In an article in The Sunday Times to promote their book, they presented the interest of "burnt-out stockbrokers" in the advice provided by Downsizer as an instance of the "mediocrity" of contemporary British culture.
