= Daniel Lyons (shipwreck) =

Schooner that sank in Lake Michigan

- U.S. National Register of Historic Places
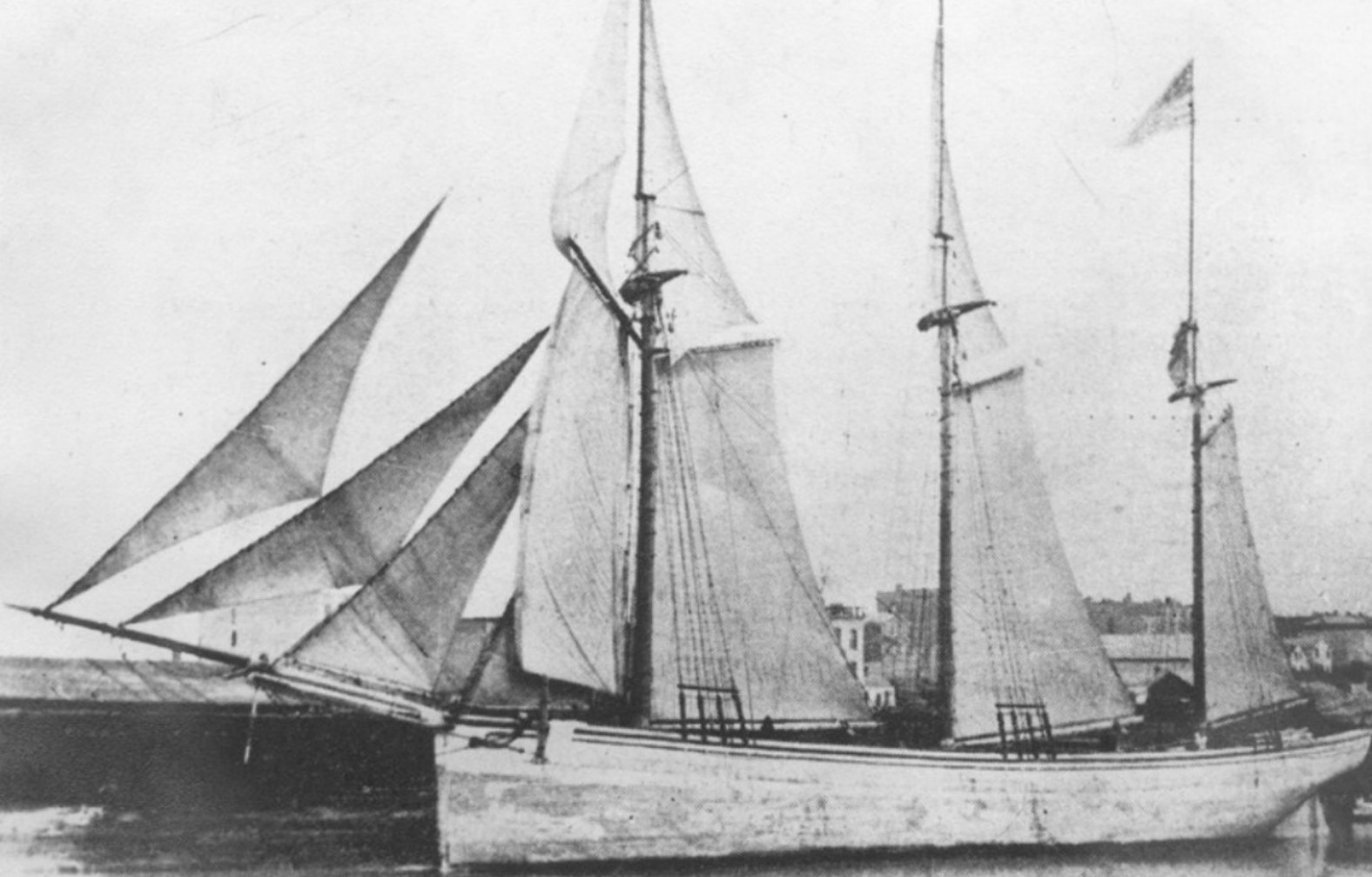
- The M.J. Cummings, a nearly identical ship to the Lyons, also built by George Goble

- Location within Wisconsin
- Location: Lake Michigan off the coast of Algoma, Wisconsin
- Coordinates: 44°40′13.2″N 87°17′42.6″W
- NRHP reference No.: 07001048
- Added to NRHP: October 3, 2007

Daniel Lyons was a schooner that sank in Lake Michigan off the coast of Algoma, Wisconsin, United States. In 2007 the shipwreck site was added to the National Register of Historic Places.

== History ==
The ship was built at Oswego, New York in 1873, at a cost of $27,000.

On October 17, 1878, the vessel departed from Chicago, Illinois and was bound for Black Rock, New York. In the early morning hours of the next day, the Daniel Lyons spotted the running lights of the Kate Gillett, a schooner that was carrying fence posts from Cedar River, Michigan to Chicago. The Kate Gillett then began moving erratically. When it became apparent that the vessels were about to collide, the Daniel Lyons tried to make a desperate evasive move, but it was unsuccessful. The Kate Gillett struck the Daniel Lyons in the side, pushing her stem nearly halfway through the hull. For around fifteen minutes, the two vessels remained locked together. After crew members from the foundering Daniel Lyons boarded the other ship, they broke apart and the Daniel Lyons sank bow first. Despite also being badly damaged, the Kate Gillett began her journey to Chicago again. Both crews worked at a vigorous pace to keep the ship afloat, and made it to port the next day.

The shipwreck site is a popular spot for divers. It has also been used for archaeological purposes.
