= Sustainable product development =

Sustainable product development (SPD) is a method for product development that incorporates t he Framework for Strategic Sustainable Development (FSSD), also known as The Natural Step (TNS). Incorporating sustainability aspects early on in the product development process has been claimed to offer competitive advantage.

== Scope ==
SPD includes both product development and product design. Design has two main goals: preventing waste and minimizing environmental impact.

Environmental impact involves deforestation, greenhouse gas emissions, resource/material management, etc. Resource acquisition (extraction and refining) tends to be the activity that most affects the environment. Use of renewable and recyclable materials can diminish pollution and waste. Conserving and avoiding resource use (e.g., water), and adopting renewable energy improve sustainability.

== History ==
SPD originates from the 1972 United Nations Conference on the Human Environment, the 1987 Brundtland Report, Our Common Future, and the 1992 UN Conference on Environment and Improvement.

== Literature ==
- Sophie Hallstedt. "A foundation for sustainable product development" (PDF).
- Information Resources Management Association (2011). Green Technologies: Concepts, Methodologies, Tools and Applications. Hershey, New York. ISBN 9781609604738.
- Charter, M. & Tischner, U. (2001). Sustainable Solutions. Greenleaf Publishing. ISBN 978-1-874719-36-6.

== See also ==
- Sustainable design
- Strategic Sustainable Development
