= Electrochemical noise =

Electrochemical noise (ECN) is the generic term given to fluctuations of current and potential. When associated with corrosion, it is the result of stochastic pulses of current generated by sudden film rupture, crack propagation, and discrete events involving metal dissolution and hydrogen discharge with gas bubble formation and detachment. The technique of measuring electrochemical noise uses no external signal for the collection of experimental data.

The ECN technique measures the signal perturbations, which are low-level fluctuations of the corrosion potential between two nominally identical electrodes, which can be used in the mechanistic determination of corrosion type and speed. The fluctuations are usually of low amplitude, less than 1 mV, and of low-frequency bandpass filtered RMS value (DC and high-frequency AC components removed). The noise corresponds with the low-level frequency noise (differential of the ZRA) signal but has a much lower amplitude when general corrosion is involved. The major source of noise can be attributed to macroscopic random-stochastic phenomena. They include partial faradaic current adsorption/desorption, surface coverage, corrosion cracking, and mechanical erosion processes. A common feature of this 1/f Poisson spectra is that it differs from the "white" Gaussian noise, in which accuracy increases as the square root of the measurement time.

The technique considers the reactions occurring at the metal–solution interface and suggests two currents flowing on each electrode as a result of the anodic and cathodic reactions. Once regarded as a source of bias and error that compromised electrochemical measurements, it is now regarded as a rich source of information. The technique is widely used in the Corrosion engineering world as a useful Corrosion Monitoring technique.

The ECN phenomenon belongs to the general category of random low-frequency stochastic processes described by either probability density function equations or in statistical terms. These random processes are either stationary or non-stationary. The first moments of a stationary process are invariant with time.
