= Inhabitat =

Inhabitat is a blog focused on green design and lifestyle topics. The website covers the future of design as well as technology and architectural projects that emphasize energy efficiency, sustainability, and connection to the surrounding environment.

== History ==
Inhabitat was founded by Columbia University architectural graduate student Jill Fehrenbacher in 2005. In a blog post, Fehrenbacher described quitting her job in digital marketing to go to architectural school, and then dropping out to focus on growing the site. "I wanted to forge my voice in the design world and get to know the designers and thought-leaders that were actually making, building and creating amazing things in the real world," she wrote in 2011.

By 2007, the site had a full-time salaried managing editor and around a dozen contributors who earned a nominal fee for their work. Inhabitat also launched a child-focused site called Inhabitots and an online shop. In 2009, Inhabitat raised more than $500,000 in financing from a European investment company.

The Los Angeles-based media company Internet Brands acquired Inhabitat in September 2011, with Fehrenbacher agreeing to continue as the site's manager and editor-in-chief. In June 2017, Fehrenbacher announced she was stepping down from running Inhabitat to focus on her family.

== Recognition ==
In early 2009, the New York Times featured Fehrenbacher and Inhabitat in its Home & Garden section. Time magazine put Inhabitat on "The Green List 100" in 2009 in the Websites category. Mother Nature Network (MNN) named the site to its list of eight influential green websites in 2010.
