= Sustainable regional development =

Sustainable Regional Development refers to the application of sustainable development on a regional scale, rather than local, national or global level. It is believed to be a fundamental journey in fulfilling the aim of economic stability, social equity, and ecological balance.

== Sustainable Regional Economic Development ==
Regional economies that solely rely on a single industry for economic growth are prone to struggles after experiencing external shocks as there is insufficient innovation momentum within the community.

== Sustainable Regional Equity Development ==
Sustainable regional development has particular currency in Australia, where the Institute for Sustainable Regional Development has been established (1997) for the purpose of developing integrated, multi- and inter-disciplinary strategies for environmental and socio-economic change in regional Australia.
