= EEG and Clinical Neuroscience Society =

International scientific organization

EEG and Clinical Neuroscience Society (ECNS)
- Founded: 1998
- Purpose: Electrophysiology
- Location: Johnson City, Tennessee
- Key people: M. Kemal Arikan, President
- Website: www.ecnsweb.org

The EEG and Clinical Neuroscience Society (ECNS) is an international scientific and educational organization dedicated to disseminating knowledge regarding the latest scientific advances in all fields of electrophysiology as they relate to the understanding, treatment, and prevention of neurobehavioral disorders.

ECNS publishes, in conjunction with SAGE Publishing, Clinical EEG and Neuroscience. Clinical EEG and Neuroscience conveys clinically relevant research and development in electroencephalography and neuroscience. The primary goal of ECNS is to further the clinical practice of classic electroencephalography (EEG), quantitative EEG (QEEG), evoked potentials, magnetoencephalography (MEG), electroconvulsive therapy (ECT), transcranial magnetic stimulation (TMS), deep brain stimulation (DBS), polysomnography (sleep EEG), and EEG neurofeedback from the professional, scientific, and economic standpoints.

== History ==
ECNS was formed as a result of merger between American Medical EEG Association (AMEEGA) and the American Psychiatric Electrophysiology Association (APEA).

== Annual meeting ==
ECNS has one major annual meeting which facilitates presentations of new scientific and clinical information, review symposia, and a review and discussion of medical economics as it pertains to ECNS members.

Meetings from 2004-2009 were jointly held with the International Society for Neuroimaging in Psychiatry (ISNIP)

Meetings from 2010-present were jointly held with ISNIP and the International Society for Brain Electromagnetic Tomography (ISBET)

== Presidents ==
Presidents of the Society have included the following persons:

- Norman Moore
- E. Roy John
- Frank Duffy
- Nash Boutros
- David S. Cantor
- Ivan Bodis-Wollner
- Silvana Galderisi
- Armida Mucci
