= Master of Resource Management =

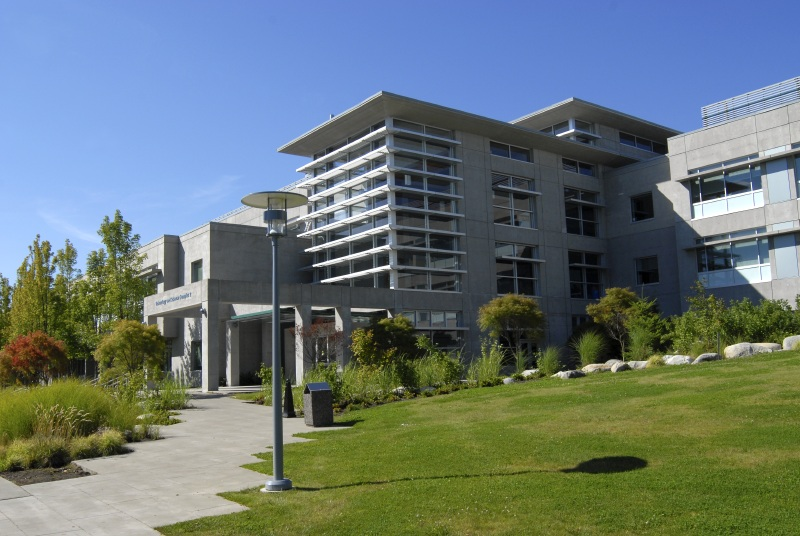
- The TASC1 Building
- Type: Graduate degree
- Parent institution: Simon Fraser University
- Dean: Sean Markey
- Director: Meg Holden
- Location: Burnaby, British Columbia, Canada; 49.276643°N 122.914205°W
- Campus: Urban
- Faculty: Environment
- Website: www.sfu.ca/rem/prospective-students/graduate-students/mrm.html

The Master of Resource Management (MRM) degree is a graduate degree program in the School of Resource and Environmental Management at Simon Fraser University in Burnaby, British Columbia, Canada. and the university centre of the Westfjords, Iceland. This program is designed for both recent graduates and individuals with experience in the private or public sector in dealing with natural resources and the environment. The program seeks students from a range of disciplines including biology, engineering, chemistry, forestry, geology, business, economics, geography, planning and social sciences. The program is recognized as an accredited sustainable planning program by the Canadian Institute of Planners and the Association for the Advancement of Sustainability in Higher Education.

== Degree requirements ==
The M.R.M. degree requires completion of six required courses (social science in natural resource management, ecology, ecological economics, earth systems, research methods), six elective courses, a field workshop, and a research project.

The aim is to increase familiarity and competence in understanding the dynamics of natural resources, the strategies and techniques of natural resource and environmental planning and management, and the biological, physical, social, economic and institutional implications of resource decisions. Students also become familiar with various quantitative methods of analysis and aids to decision making. In the field of natural resources, in particular, it is important that an academic degree provide a foundation for problem-solving as well as creative and critical thinking rather than focus primarily on subject matter such as fisheries, economics, or forestry.

Graduate student research projects required to complete the degree evaluate the effectiveness of existing natural resource management policies and, where appropriate, present alternatives. Students apply a range of approaches including cost-benefit analysis, simulation modeling, legal and institutional assessment frameworks, and social surveys to address critical and emerging natural resource management issues on local, national, and international scales.
