= Milthorpe Lecture =

The Milthorpe Lecture is a series of public lectures on environmental science held at Macquarie University, Australia. It is endowed by the Milthorpe Fund in memory of F.L. Milthorpe, Chair of Biology at the University from 1967–1982. The first lecture was delivered by David Suzuki in 1989.

== List of lecturers ==
- Dr. David Suzuki, Biologist and Environmental Activist (1989)
- Professor Paul R. Ehrlich, Biologist
- Sir Ninian Stephen, Former Governor-General of Australia and Australian Ambassador for the Environment (1990)
- Neville Wran, Former Premier of New South Wales and Chairman of the Commonwealth Scientific and Industrial Research Organisation (1991)
- Senator Dr. Bob Brown, Environmental Activist and Australian Senator
- Professor Michael Archer, Director of the Australian Museum
- Senator John Faulkner, Australian Senator and Minister for the Environment (1995)
- Dr. Richard Jefferson, Biologist and CEO of CAMBIA (1999)
- Dr. Clive Hamilton, Executive Director of The Australia Institute (2006)
- Professor Peter Singer, Bioethicist (2009)
- Professor Ian Chubb, Chief Scientist of Australia (2013)
- James Woodford, Environmental and Science Journalist (2014)
