= Sustainability studies =

Field of research

Sustainability studies is an interdisciplinary academic field examining principles and practices of sustainability and sustainable development. Curriculum often integrates geography, agriculture, environmental policy, ethics, ecology, landscape architecture, urban and regional planning, economics, natural resource management, sociology, and anthropology.

The three spheres of sustainability

Numerous universities offer degree programs in sustainability studies to prepare graduates for roles in environmental management, policy development, and sustainable business practices.

== History ==
=== Origins of sustainability studies ===
Early sustainability concepts emerged in response to resource overexploitation during the Industrial Revolution, when unregulated extraction of coal, oil, and iron caused widespread ecological damage. Conservation organisations such as the National Audubon Society (founded 1886) and the Sierra Club (founded 1892) aimed to protect wildlife and wildlands, and the Lacey Act of 1900 became the United States' first federal wildlife-protection law.

In the early twentieth century, advocates including Gene Stratton-Porter promoted preservation, and scientific advances by George Washington Carver and Marie Curie influenced sustainable practices in agriculture and energy. President Theodore Roosevelt established numerous national parks and reserves, protecting over 230 million acres and raising public awareness of conservation.

Global attention to ecological limits grew in the late 1980s. The Brundtland Commission (1983–1987), chaired by Gro Harlem Brundtland, issued the Brundtland Report in 1987, defining sustainable development as "development that meets the needs of the present without compromising the ability of future generations to meet their own needs".

=== Development of the field ===
The 1992 UN Earth Summit in Rio led to the United Nations Framework Convention on Climate Change, which informed the 1997 Kyoto Protocol's emission reduction targets. While the US did not ratify Kyoto and some nations failed to meet pledges, these agreements established frameworks for global cooperation. In 2015, the UN adopted seventeen Sustainable Development Goals with targets for 2030.

Researchers in the late twentieth and early twenty-first centuries proposed that sustainability assessments integrate economic, environmental, social, and institutional dimensions; consider long-term and precautionary perspectives; engage stakeholders; and address intra- and intergenerational equity.

== Spheres of sustainability ==
Sustainability is commonly described by three interconnected dimensions social, economic, and environmental often called the "triple bottom line."

- Social: This dimension addresses human well-being and equity issues, including food security, housing, poverty, healthcare, and education. It draws on disciplines such as sociology, psychology, and anthropology, with nonprofit and government policies promoting social sustainability and human rights.
- Economic: This dimension focuses on economic activity and efficiency, encouraging businesses and governments to adopt practices that support growth while minimising environmental risks.
- Environmental: This dimension concerns the natural environment's health, evaluating issues such as pollution, natural hazards, resource use, and deforestation, and proposing solutions at local to global scales.

These dimensions overlap: social and economic intersect in social justice; economic and environmental in environmental stewardship; and environmental and social in environmental justice.

=== Social justice ===
Social justice in sustainability ensures equitable access to resources, opportunities, and quality of life alongside economic stability. Key policy areas include social protection, public services, and labor standards aimed at reducing inequities within effective governance.

Workers' rights underpin social justice, with "decent work" defined by the International Labour Organization as productive work in conditions of freedom, equity, security, and human dignity. Certification schemes like Fairtrade verify compliance with criteria protecting workers' rights and promoting sustainable production.

=== Environmental stewardship ===
Environmental stewardship entails collaborative efforts by businesses, governments, and communities to manage natural resources responsibly and sustainably. Practices include waste reduction through material reuse and recycling, energy efficiency improvements, and shifts to renewable energy sources to lower environmental impact and operational costs.

=== Environmental justice ===
Environmental justice examines how environmental benefits and burdens are distributed across social groups, often based on race, income, or geography. Climate change—which intensifies extreme weather, raises temperatures, and increases variability—can disproportionately affect low-income communities lacking resources to relocate or adapt.

In the United States, Lowndes County, Alabama, illustrates an environmental justice concern: many predominantly African American residents lack functioning septic systems, resulting in raw sewage exposure and potential penalties for noncompliance. Catherine Coleman Flowers documents these public health challenges in her book Waste: One Woman's Fight Against America's Dirty Secret.

Globally, climate justice issues arise from uneven climate impacts. Mary Robinson's Climate Justice presents case studies – including flood and drought threats in Uganda, war and deforestation legacies in Vietnam, and rising sea levels in Kiribati to show how climate risks exacerbate existing inequalities.

== Careers in sustainability studies ==
Sustainability studies emphasizes an interdisciplinary approach, drawing on law, political science, urban planning, business, architecture, journalism, marine sciences, agriculture, and environmental engineering.

In the United States, salaries for sustainability professionals have increased since 2017. As of 2024, sustainability specialists and managers typically earn between US$85,000 and US$115,000 per year, while chief sustainability officers average US$180,000 to US$230,000. Entry-level roles such as sustainability analysts and coordinators generally offer salaries from US$60,000 to US$85,000. These trends reflect the growing importance of environmental, social and governance initiatives across industries.

== Criticism ==
Critics argue that the Sustainable Development Goals (SDGs) are overly broad, with numerous targets that may dilute focus and pose challenges for measurement due to limited data capacity in some countries. Tensions between socio-economic development objectives and environmental sustainability complicate implementation and monitoring, while nonbinding targets and unclear financing arrangements leave progress dependent on voluntary national reporting. A substantial financing gap and lack of enforcement mechanisms further impede effective action. Some scholars contend that the SDGs insufficiently address structural inequities, as consumption and production patterns in wealthier countries can undermine sustainability efforts in developing regions.

== See also ==
- List of environmental degrees
- List of sustainability topics
- Sustainability science
