= Bachelor of Environmental Design =

Undergraduate course of study

A Bachelor of Environmental Design, (B.EnvD.), is an undergraduate course of study. Similar in nature to a pre-law degree, a B.EnvD is designed as preparatory undergraduate training for a professional course of study in architecture, landscape architecture, or urban planning, and is one of several degrees offered as preparatory training for the Master of Architecture degree. An alternative three-year Master of Architecture exists for people with a bachelor's degree not related to design, the M.Arch I degree. A Bachelor of Environmental Design should not be confused with a Bachelor in Environmental Studies, which though similar, does not train one for graduate professional study in architecture, landscape design, or urban planning. Environmental Design degree programs generally take four years of full-time study to complete, and many institutions allow a specialty emphasis within urban planning, architecture or landscape architecture. Other pre-professional degrees include the B.S. in Architectural Studies, B.A. in Architecture, the B.S. in Architecture, and the B.S. in Construction Management. Though the Bachelor of Environmental Design is not accredited by the National Architectural Accrediting Board NAAB, like other college degrees, programs in Environmental Design are accredited through their host-institution schools by various regional agencies, such as the Middle States Association of Colleges and Schools, or the North Central Association of Colleges and Schools. The Bachelor of Environmental Design should not be confused with the M.Arch or the five-year accredited B.Arch degree.

== Purpose and nature of training ==
Modern environmental design began as a series of separate disciplines that intersect between the professional worlds of architecture, product design, and the eco/environmental movement. Intersecting disciplines of similar philosophies include permaculture, complementary gardening, sustainable agriculture, zero-energy building design, passive solar architecture, pollution mitigation, cradle-to-grave, open space preservation, New Urbanism, sustainable transportation and traffic planning, multi-modal transportation design etc. With the development of a bachelor's degree, these various different disparate fields are brought together in a unified, but interdisciplinary field of environmental design. In the academic world, environmental design may cross disciplines with departments of geography, environmental science, climatology, neuroscience, and various others. The most publicly known example of environmental design is LEED certified design, which stands for Leadership in Energy and Environmental Design. Sustainable design is rapidly being adopted by governments around the world. On October 28, 2010, the U.S. General Services Administration moved to mandate LEED certification in all new federal buildings.

== List of environmental design degree–granting institutions ==
- Art Center College of Design
- Arizona State University, Herberger Institute of Design
- Auburn University, College of Architecture Design and Construction
- Cal Poly Pomona, College of Environmental Design
- Cornell University, Department of Design and Environmental Analysis
- Montana State University, School of Architecture
- North Carolina State University, School of Architecture
- North Dakota State University, Department of Architecture and Landscape Architecture
- Ontario College of Art and Design, Department of Environmental Design
- Stony Brook University, Sustainability Studies Program
- The University of Oklahoma, The Gibbs College of Architecture|Environmental design /architecture.ou.edu/environmental/
- Texas A&M College of Architecture
- Texas Tech University
- University of Colorado at Boulder, Environmental Design
- University at Buffalo, Department of Urban and Regional Planning
- University of Hawaii at Manoa, School of Architecture
- University of Houston, Gerald D. Hines College of Architecture
- University of Massachusetts Amherst
- University of Minnesota, College of Design
- University of Puerto Rico, School of Architecture
- University of British Columbia, SALA
- Dalhousie University
- University of Manitoba
- Griffith University
- Rutgers University, Department of Landscape Architecture

== See also ==
- List of environmental degrees
- Bachelor of Architecture
- Master of Architecture
- Bachelor of Environmental Studies
- Bachelor of Environmental Science
- Bachelor of Science in Landscape Architecture
- Master of Landscape Architecture
- Urban planning education
