= Hydrogen-powered racing =

Use of hydrogen fuel in motorsport competitions

Hydrogen-powered racing refers to the use of hydrogen as an energy source for vehicles competing in motorsport. Hydrogen can power race cars through fuel cell systems that generate electricity or by direct combustion of hydrogen gas. The technology is being developed to reduce carbon emissions in competitive racing while maintaining performance comparable to conventional petrol-powered vehicles.

== Overview ==
Hydrogen propulsion is one of several pathways being explored in the transition to sustainable motorsport. Hydrogen can be used in two main ways:

- Hydrogen fuel cells, which convert hydrogen and oxygen into electricity to power electric motors, emitting only water vapor.
- Hydrogen internal combustion engines (H₂ ICE), which burn hydrogen gas directly in a modified combustion engine, producing water as the main byproduct.

Both approaches aim to combine zero-emission performance with the speed and endurance required in motorsport. The low molecular weight and high energy density of hydrogen make it suitable for long-distance racing, where battery weight and charging time remain limiting factors.

== History ==
Hydrogen technology in racing began appearing in concept form during the early 2000s, when several manufacturers showcased prototype hydrogen-powered cars such as the BMW Hydrogen 7 and Mazda RX-8 Hydrogen RE. However, competitive motorsport applications remained experimental until the late 2010s.

In 2021, the Automobile Club de l'Ouest (ACO) announced plans to introduce a dedicated hydrogen-powered class for the 24 Hours of Le Mans endurance race, targeted for the late 2020s. The category will allow both hydrogen fuel-cell and combustion-based prototypes, with development support from major manufacturers including Toyota, Hyundai, and BMW.

The Mission H24 project, a collaboration between the ACO and GreenGT, developed one of the first hydrogen-powered endurance race cars, the H24 prototype, which has competed in Michelin Le Mans Cup events since 2019.

== Technology ==
Hydrogen racing vehicles typically employ the following components:

- A hydrogen storage system, often using high-pressure carbon-fibre composite tanks rated to 700 bar.
- Fuel-cell stacks or combustion engines designed to handle hydrogen's high flammability and cooling requirements.
- Lightweight battery systems for energy buffering and regenerative braking.
- Electric motors with torque delivery optimised for endurance racing.

Hydrogen fuel cells generate power through electrochemical reactions, while combustion versions can be tuned to sound and perform similarly to petrol engines. Some manufacturers, such as Toyota Gazoo Racing, are actively developing hydrogen combustion race engines to maintain traditional driver engagement while achieving near-zero emissions.

== Championships and events ==
Hydrogen propulsion is being developed or demonstrated in several major racing series:

- Le Mans Hydrogen Class - set to debut in the FIA World Endurance Championship in the mid-2020s.
- Mission H24 / H24Racing: experimental hydrogen prototypes competing in Le Mans Cup events.
- FIM E-Xplorer World Cup: exploring hydrogen and electric off-road motorcycle technologies in future seasons.
- Extreme H: a hydrogen-powered successor to Extreme E, expected to begin in 2026.
- Toyota hydrogen demonstration vehicles: tested in Japan's Super Taikyu Series since 2021.

== Advantages and challenges ==
Hydrogen offers high energy density and rapid refuelling compared to battery electric vehicles, making it suitable for endurance racing formats. However, challenges include:

- Limited hydrogen refuelling infrastructure
- High cost of fuel-cell and storage technologies
- Safety concerns related to hydrogen flammability
- Production emissions if hydrogen is not sourced from renewable energy (“green hydrogen”)

Manufacturers and race organisers are investing in hydrogen production and transport logistics to ensure the sustainability of future hydrogen racing programs.

== Future ==
Hydrogen propulsion is expected to become a key element of sustainable motorsport by the late 2020s, alongside synthetic fuels and electric powertrains. The success of initiatives like Mission H24 and Extreme H may influence the broader adoption of hydrogen technologies in both racing and road vehicles.

== See also ==
- Hydrogen vehicle
- Fuel cell vehicle
- Sustainable motorsport
