= Factory Green =

American online retailer

Factory Green, Inc.
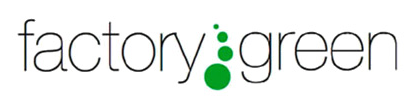
- Type: Private
- Industry: Retail (Apparel)
- Founded: 2007
- Headquarters: Columbia, Missouri, United States
- Key people: Co-Founders: Daniel Lyons; Jack Short
- Products: Eco-Friendly clothing, accessories, housewares

Factory Green, Inc., was an American, eco-friendly clothing and accessories online retail store and was based in Columbia, Missouri. Factory Green was co-founded in 2007 by Daniel Lyons, CEO, and Jack Short, President and Chairman. The company focused on offering "urban and trendy" environmentally friendly apparel, accessories, and apartment wares, marketing specifically to the college-aged demographic. The company offered both organic cotton and bamboo apparel manufactured in facilities running solely on wind and solar power. Factory Green donated a portion of its revenue to the United Nations Water For Life organization which provides clean water to under-served populations around the globe.

Factory Green shipped to the United States, Canada, Australia, the United Kingdom, and other European countries.

== History ==
Factory Green was founded by University of Missouri undergraduates, who got the idea for the company from their study abroad experiences in Europe.

The company no longer exists as of 2026. The website domain is up for sale.

=== Philosophy ===
Factory Green aimed to take the environmental movement to a new generation of socially aware consumers, enabling them to live and wear the green lifestyle, and change the world through reducing their environmental impact.

== Customer Base and Apparel ==
Factory Green's graphic apparel was designed by University of Missouri fashion and design students. The blank organic cotton and bamboo T-shirts and hoodies were produced in small facilities in India which ran on wind and solar power and were constructed by fair trade workers.
