= Environmental Change Network =

The Environmental Change Network (ECN) was established in 1992 by the Natural Environment Research Council (NERC) to monitor long-term environmental change and its effects on ecosystems at a series of sites throughout Great Britain and Northern Ireland.

== Function ==
Measurements made include a wide range of physical, chemical and biological variables, taken from rural sites across the UK.

== Structure ==
It is headquartered at the Lancaster Environment Centre.

== See also ==
- Climate change
- International Geosphere-Biosphere Programme
- Freshwater Biological Association
