= Environmental education in the United States =

Education in the United States

Modern environmental education in the United States began to take shape in the late 19th century with the Nature Study movement, which grew out of efforts to promote the field of natural history by naturalists including Harvard professor Louis Agassiz (1807-1873) and Anna Botsford Comstock, whose Handbook of Nature Study was published in 1911.

== Definition ==
At the International Environmental Education Workshop led by the United Nations Educational, Scientific and Cultural Organization (UNESCO) and United Nations Environment Programme (UNEP) held in Belgrade, Yugoslavia, in 1975, environmental education aims were established: “The goal of environmental education is to develop a world population that is aware of, and concerned about, the environment and its associated problems, and which has the knowledge, skills, attitudes, motivations and commitment to work individually and collectively toward solutions of current problems and the prevention of new ones.”

== History ==
=== Early history ===
In the latter half of the 1800s, as the western frontier was settled and the continent no longer seemed limitless, and as children increasingly grew up in urbanized and polluted environments, interest in fostering a connection to nature grew.

The conservation movement, fostered by well-known figures such as Henry David Thoreau (1817 – 1862) and Theodore Roosevelt (1858 – 1919), added an element of environmental preservation to the examination of nature characteristic of the Nature Study movement.

Summer camps and the Scouting movement for boys and girls, both emerging in the late 1800s to early 1900s, also had exploration, study of, and appreciation for the outdoors as fundamental components.

=== Recent history ===
The 1960s brought increased awareness of environmental issues, leading to the first Earth Day event in 1970 while environmental education gained definition and structure in the US and elsewhere in the 1970s through the United Nations’ Belgrade Charter, and proceedings from the 1977 International Conference on Environmental Education in Tbilisi.

The Environmental Education Act of 1970 led to the creation of the Office of Environmental Education in the U.S. Environmental Protection Agency, and the following year the organization which became the current day North American Association for Environmental Education was founded, and which has a number of affiliates in most US states as well as Canadian provinces and Mexico.

In 1987, the Brundtland Report from the World Commission on Environment and Development gave a modern definition of sustainability, which is fundamental to effective environmental education.

In 1995, the Environmental Education and Training Partnership (EETAP) was established by a group of environmental education organizations, and received funding from the U.S. EPA.

Academicians concepts in environmental education, such as "responsible environmental behavior, and promoted research elucidating which environmental education techniques were and were not effective.

Environmental education programs for children, college students and adults continued to develop in the 1990s to the current day.

== Criticism ==
Environmental education in the US and globally, along with the larger environmental movement, has been criticized for failure to achieve its overall aims, despite discrete successful moments.

== See also ==
- Environment of the United States
- Education in the United States
- Acid Rain Retirement Fund
- Alliance for Climate Education
- Burton 4-H Center
- Center for Ecoliteracy
- Clean Ocean Action
- Junior Forest Rangers
- National Environmental Education Act
- National Wildlife Federation
- Nature centers in the United States
- New Jersey School of Conservation
- No Child Left Inside Act of 2009
- North American Association for Environmental Education
- Pine Mountain Settlement School
- Salmon Watch
- The Fairchild Challenge
