= Environmental adult education =

Education

Environmental adult education is a "hybrid outgrowth of the environmental movement and adult education, combining an ecological orientation with a learning paradigm to provide a vigorous educational approach to environmental concerns." It refers to efforts in teaching environmental issues and how individuals and businesses can manage or change their lifestyles and their ecosystems in order to achieve sustainable existence. The overarching goal of this field of study is to educate global citizens in order for them to gain sustainable lives within their respective societies. The content could also include ecological justice, integrating social concerns such as poverty, race, gender, and sexual orientation, among others. This relationship is demonstrated in the impact of the excesses of global capitalism and its insatiable need for resources on people such as the polarization of power and wealth.

== History ==
Environmental adult education is a relatively new field of study and practice. Using a community-based method, educators listen and respect the input of learners.

Although for more than a century, environmental and conservation organizations taught adults environmental education with very little structure, it has actually evolved during the last thirty years.

The United States was one of the first countries to officially recognize environmental education. During a joint House–Senate session in 1968, Congress acknowledged the importance of environmental education, and in 1970 passed the Environmental Education Act, which established the Office of Environmental Education. In 1992, this framework began to emerge in Asia and Latin America, where it is considered a stream of adult education and sometimes referred to as environmental popular education. The United Nations, for its part, began integrating the concept of environmental sustainability to the Education for All initiative, which is a set of UN policies with a goal of meeting learning needs of all people, as well as the Millennium Development Goals (MDGs). Specifically, the UN-organized Earth Summit in 1992, prompted the International Council for Adult Education to develop the Learning for Environmental Action Programme (LEAP) which took the initiative of facilitating the dialogue that connect environmental issues and adult learning.

== Earlier environmental education initiatives ==
According to UNESCO, in 1968 it organized the first intergovernmental conference aimed at reconciling the environment and development, now known as sustainable development. In the following years, UNESCO and the United Nations Environment Program (UNEP) initiated three major declarations that defined environmental education. Those included:

- 1972: Stockholm Declaration. This document included seven proclamations and 26 principles "to inspire and guide the peoples of the world in the preservation and enhancement of the human environment."
- 1975: Belgrade Charter. The product of the International Workshop on Environmental Education, this charter built upon the Stockholm Declaration by adding goals, objectives and principles for environmental education programs.
- 1977: Tbilisi Declaration. This document updated and clarified the Stockholm Declaration and the Belgrade Charter by including new goals, objectives, characteristics, and guiding principles of environmental education.

== Methods ==
Educators in this field of study consider environmental problems with a holistic approach that combines social, political and environmental concerns into community dilemmas.

Participatory methods allow learners to make connections between social issues and environmental problems. This connection allows adult learners to understand the core causes of major environmental issues and the resulting social inequalities. This method also allows educators to stress the importance of instilling environmental awareness so that learners do not forget their relationship with the natural world.

To summarize the methods of adult environmental education training, environmental adult educators strive to instil learners with: a knowledge of environmental problems and their causes, the skills to engage in social activism to combat those problems, the attitude of respect and connection to the natural world, and a desire to change current practices to protect the Earth.

Environmental adult education generally takes place in a nonformal education setting. This means that the organized learning can take place in many forms including vocational education, literacy education and on the job training. There are, however, examples of formal learning such as the degree programs and courses in higher education. It could also be a combination of these methods of environmental educational program delivery as demonstrated in the case of El Salvador's National Environmental Education Strategy, which covered all aspect of education via a private-public partnership. The government - through its Ministry of Education - integrated environmental education in schools, including tertiary education institutions, while partners such as media outfits deliver meaningful environmental concepts to targeted audiences and the general public.

== Programs and organizations ==
Programs and organizations that encourage adult environmental education include:

- Conservation education and governmental agencies such as the United States Forest Service and the Environmental Protection Agency (EPA) were established to educate adults in broad areas of the environment.
- The Nature Conservancy, originally the Ecological Society of America, was formed in 1915 with the missions of supporting ecologists and preserving natural ecosystems.
- The 4-H Organization was also established to reach adults by educating youth in areas of new agricultural technology and environmental awareness.
- The Peace Corps, established in 1961, has worked to incorporate adult environmental education and conservation practices into its international programming. Volunteers assist in:
- Project WILD is a conservation and environmental education program for educators of students in kindergarten through high school. Project WILD addresses the need for human beings to develop as responsible citizens of the planet. It is based on the belief that young adults and educators have an interest in learning about the natural world.
- Project Learning Tree, a program of the American Forest Foundation, is a multi-disciplinary environmental education program for educators and students in PreK–Grade 12.
- Gobar Times a monthly environmental education magazine for the young adult.
