= Institute for Earth Education =

The Institute for Earth Education was set up in 1974 by Steve Van Matre and others to promote Earth Education. It is a not-for-profit organization with branches in several countries, including Australia, Canada, Finland, Germany, Italy, Japan, the Netherlands, the United Kingdom, and the United States.

The organization was founded upon the following beliefs:

"The environmental education movement has been led astray:

- trivialized by the mainstream education
- diluted by those with other agendas
- co-opted by the very agencies and industries that have contributed so much to the problems."

Along with their criticism of mainstream environmental education, the Institute developed an alternative in the form of concept paths and activities. Some of these have been developed into full educational programmes, including:

- Earthkeepers (for ages 10-11)
- Sunship Earth/Earthkeepers II (for ages 10-11)
- Sunship III (for ages 13-14)
- Muir Trek (for adults)
