= Icy =

Icy commonly refers to conditions involving ice, a frozen state, usually referring to frozen water.

Icy or Icey may also refer to:

== People ==
- Icy Spicy Leoncie, an Icelandic-Indian musician

== Arts, entertainment, and media ==
=== Music ===
- ICY (band), a vocalist trio
- "Icy" (Itzy song), 2019
- "Icy" (Gucci Mane song), 2005
- "Icy", a song by Kim Petras from the project Clarity, 2019
- "Icy", a song by Logic from the album Confessions of a Dangerous Mind, 2019
- "Icy", a song by Vain from the album No Respect, 1989
- "Icey", a song by Young Thug from the EP On the Rvn, 2018

=== Other ===
- Icey, a 2016 video game
- Icy, a member of the Trix in the fictional series Winx Club

== Other uses ==
- Icy (application), a package manager for iPhone OS
- iCy, a penguin toy that is similar to the iDog

== See also ==
- The Icee Company, makers of ICEE frozen carbonated beverage
- IcyHot, a brand of liniments
- ICEE (disambiguation)
