= Learning Tree (disambiguation) =

The Learning Tree is a semiautobiographical novel written by Gordon Parks.

The Learning Tree is a 1969 drama film based on the book.

Learning Tree may also refer to:

== Schools ==
- Learning Tree School, a private school in Brunei
- Learning Tree Academy, a school in Ghana
- Learning Tree School, Whitfield County, Georgia, U.S.
- Learning Tree School, Palm Desert, Coachella Valley, California, U.S.

== Other uses ==
- Learning Tree International, an American provider of IT skills-enhancement training
- Project Learning Tree, a project from 1976 for environmental education in the U.S.
- The Learning Tree, a professional wrestling stable led by Chris Jericho in AEW.
- "The Learning Tree", track on 1995 album Generation 13 by Saga
