= Decision Earth =

Decision Earth, also referred to as Decision: Earth, was an environmental education teachers resource for junior high school students issued by Procter & Gamble in 1997. It has been controversial.

== Release of "Decision Earth" ==
Its asserted aim was assisting students to make informed consumer product choices, and to educate then in the environmental impact of their choices:

The unit focuses on the concept of consumer product life cycle analysis, an approach to assessing the environmental impacts of a product at each stage in its life from raw materials extraction through disposal. Using this approach, a product is evaluated in terms of energy consumed, atmospheric and waterborne emissions generated and solid waste created for disposal.

Procter & Gamble have claimed the package builds critical thinking skills

== Criticism of "Decision Earth" ==
It has been asserted that "Decision Earth" included a series of controversial claims about waste disposal, mining and forestry issues which was distributed by the Procter & Gamble corporation to roughly 75,000 schools in the United States. Procter & Gamble argued in its package that disposable diapers are no worse for the environment than cloth diapers, a claim based on scientific studies funded by the company, which is the world's largest manufacturer of disposable diapers. The package described garbage-fueled incineration processes where energy is recovered as "thermal recycling" without mentioning the toxic ash or emissions that result.

== Decision Earth package ==
The materials given to teachers and students include overhead transparency masters, student worksheets, and a teacher's guide.
