= ICY =

ICY may refer to:

- Institute for Colored Youth
- ICY (band)
- I Can Yell, media streaming protocol

== See also ==
- ICy, a robot penguin
- Icy (disambiguation)
