= Steve Van Matre =

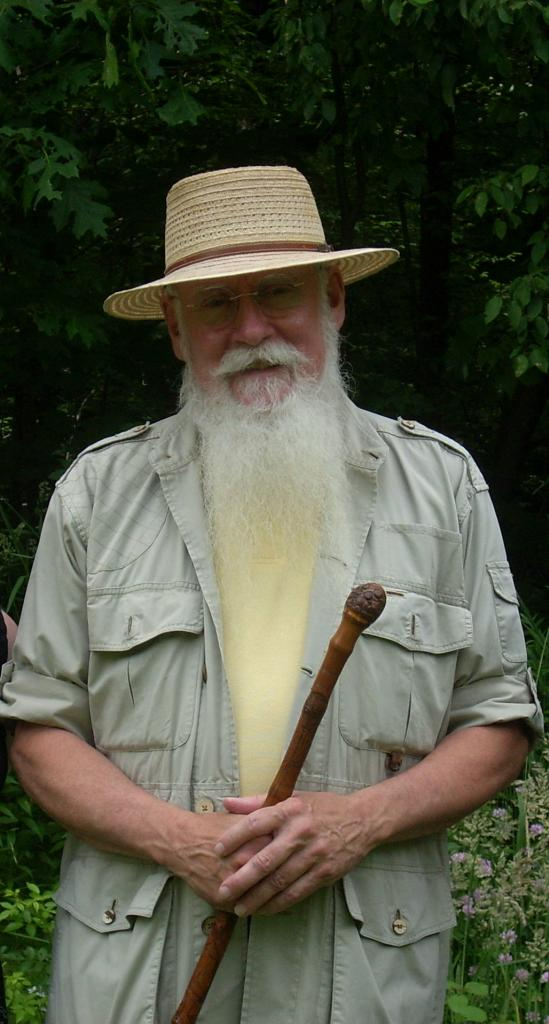
Steve Van Matre teaching a workshop

Steve Van Matre (born March 20, 1941) is an American environmental activist, author and educator. He is the founder of the Earth Education movement and chair of the Institute for Earth Education. Steve was a professor In the Leisure and Environmental Resources Association(LERA) at George Williams College Downers Grove ill in the '70s and '80s.

== Biography ==
Van Matre was a professor of environmental education and interpretation at George Williams College (later Aurora University).

== Published works ==
- Acclimatization (1972)
- Acclimatizing (1974)
- Sunship Earth (1979)
- "Earth Magic" and "Snow Walk" with Kirk Hoessle (1980)
- The Earth Speaks (1983)
- Conceptual Encounters I (1987)
- Earthkeepers with Bruce Johnson (1988)
- Conceptual Encounters II (1990)
- Earth Education: A New Beginning (1990)
- SUNSHIP III (1997)
- Rangers of the Earth (2004)
- Interpretive Design...and the dance of experience (2009)
