= Project Learning Tree Canada =

Canadian charity

Project Learning Tree Canada (PLT Canada), is a charity based in Ottawa, Canada. It aims to help youth learn about the environment and find employment in the forest and conservation sector. It was launched in 2018 after the Sustainable Forestry Initiative (SFI) took over the environmental education organization Project Learning Tree (PLT) in 2017.

PLT Canada started as a wage matching program to help youth find green jobs in Canada. The organization received funding from the Government of Canada in 2018, 2019, and 2020 to place youth aged 15 to 30 in a combined total of 3,488 jobs in the forest and conservation sector and to help them acquire professional skills.

In 2019, PLT Canada's Green Jobs Manager rode a wooden bicycle across Canada to promote opportunities in the forest and conservation sector. The “Green Ride for Green Jobs” began in Victoria. It took place over 9,000 km and included stops in Williams Lake, Prince George, Edmonton, St. Albert, Thunder Bay, Timmins, Sudbury, North Bay, and Ottawa.

PLT Canada hosted its first Green Jobs E-Summit on March 23, 2020. The event brought together youth and sector professionals from across Canada to explore careers in the forest and conservation sector. PLT Canada has placed youth in over 2,000 Green Jobs since 2018, in 12 provinces and territories. PLT Canada has also provided employment opportunities for over 250 Indigenous youth.

PLT Canada launched the Green Leaders program in 2021, which mentors youth and provides up to $1,500 for community-based projects. As of March 26, 2021, projects have included a virtual family ice fishing derby and a gardening webinar. PLT Canada's Green Mentor program (launched in 2020) also helps young people entering the forest and conservation sector by matching them with knowledgeable professionals.
