= The Fairchild Challenge =

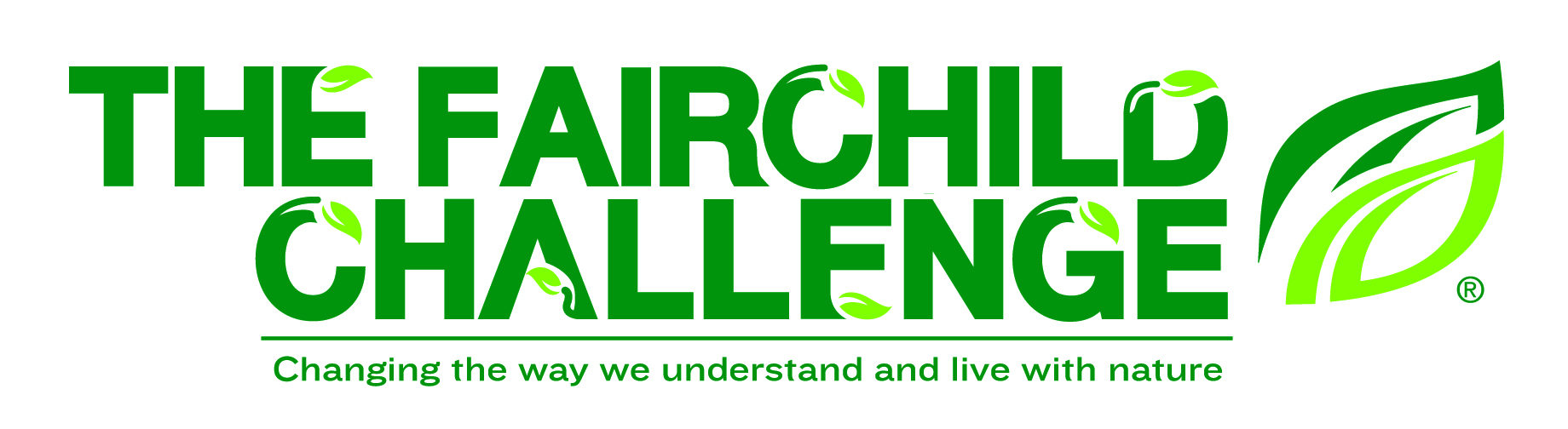
- Founded: 2002
- Headquarters: Fairchild Tropical Botanic Garden, Coral Gables, Florida, United States
- Key people: Amy Padolf, Director of Education; Jahna Brooks, Fairchild Challenge Manager
- Website: fairchildgarden.org/science-and-education/learn/the-fairchild-challenge/

The Fairchild Challenge is an environmental education outreach program of Fairchild Tropical Botanic Garden in Coral Gables, Florida.

The Fairchild Challenge promotes environmental awareness, scholarship and stewardship in students in grades pre-K through 12, and by extension in their families, schools and communities, through a combination of hands-on research, creativity and a variety of competitive projects.

The Fairchild Challenge is a multidisciplinary, environmental science competition designed to engage South Florida students of diverse interests, abilities, talents and backgrounds to explore the natural world. In 2014, the program was recognized by the American Public Gardens Association as a benchmark for exceptional STEM education and for empowering PreK-12th grade students to become the next generation of scientists, researchers, educated voters, policy makers, and environmentally-minded citizens.

The Fairchild Challenge is supported by numerous private and public sources, as well as fundraising by the Fairchild Tropical Botanic Garden’s young professionals’ organization, The Fairchild Palms.

The Fairchild Challenge consists of three parallel programs for elementary, middle and high schools. Individual schools submit projects, called Challenges, which are aligned with state academic standards. In addition to the sciences, the projects cover social studies, English, art, music and vocational classes. Past challenge outcomes have included newsletters, opinion and research papers; artwork, postcards, environmental cartoons, posters and T-shirts; performing songs and skits on stage; creating and/or restoring gardens or designated habitats; conducting oral debates; preparing meals; designing solar-powered devices; and undertaking ecological initiatives such as recycling, conducting waste and energy audits, and initiating tree plantings at home, at school and in their communities. Submissions are reviewed by judges, who designate points based on scoring rubrics, and top-scoring schools are recognized with Fairchild Challenge Awards at annual ceremonies at Fairchild Tropical Botanic Garden at the end of each school year.

During the 2013-2014 school year, participants included 125,000 students from 272 K-12 schools. Since its founding in 2002, The Fairchild Challenge has spread beyond South Florida by conducting partner site trainings for dozens of museums, zoos, botanical gardens and other institutions throughout the United States of America as well as other countries. These institutions provide their own customized Fairchild Challenge programs for their area schools based on the original South Florida model.

== See also ==
- Environmental education in the United States
- Salmon Watch
