= Environmental Literacy Plan =

State Education Plan

An Environmental Literacy Plan (ELP) refers to a state education plan to teach about how ecosystems and human systems are interdependent, particularly, how the consumption choices human beings make alter their ability to live sustainably. ELP’s serve as a central component of the No Child Left Inside movement (NCLI) of 2008 which the United States House of Representatives passed on September 18, 2008. As outlined by the NCLI of 2008, ELP’s must contain numerous and explicit provisions. The North American Association for Environmental Education (NAAEE) condenses NCLI act into five components which allow states to become eligible for funds allocated through the NCLI act.

The purpose of an ELP is to create a comprehensive education plan for environmental literacy that can be evaluated on the basis of student learning outcomes. The NCLI legislation defines goals as follows:

- Advancing content and achievement standards
- Developing or disseminating innovations or model programs,
- Research, particularly on integrating environmental education in the study of other subjects and
- Capacity-building measures to increase the number of elementary and secondary environmental education teachers.

== Definition ==
An Environmental Literacy Plan (ELP) refers to a state education plan to teach about how ecosystems and human systems are interdependent, particularly, how the consumption choices human beings make alter their ability to live sustainably. ELP’s serve as a central component of the 2008 No Child Left Inside movement (NCLI) which the U.S. House of Representatives passed.

=== State standards, content areas, and courses or subjects ===
Environmental Literacy Plan’s include environmental literacy content standards in grades Pre-kindergarten through 12th grade. Integration of the environmental literacy standards into the curriculum occur through content integration or as standalone topics of learning. "Attention should be paid to mandated learning outcomes and curriculum content, standardized tests, and instructional syllabuses". Clear and supported learning standards are required to ensure high school graduates possess a determined degree of environmental literacy.

=== High school graduation requirements ===
One component of an ELP is the consideration of how environmental literacy will be incorporated into the state’s graduation requirement. Hence high school courses should be aligned with the topic of environmental literacy, programming opportunities for students should be offered or credits for environmental literacy should be a requirement for graduation.

=== Professional development ===
The ELP provides provisions for both pre-service and in-service teacher preparation. Teacher preparation within the field of environmental literacy will need to support learning using place-based and experiential learning strategies. "The work of reorienting teachers education for the values of sustainability is crucial to creating a new understanding of ourselves and our place in communities, in the living world and in traditions of relational reciprocity that will sustain us all".

=== Assessment of environmental literacy ===
The initial ELP should contain a detailed description of how the state education agency will assess and measure the learning achieved through the implementation of the ELP. The assessment of environmental literacy of students will measure the extent to which the ELP was successful.

=== Implementation and support ===
Key logistical and implementation issues will be addressed within the ELP. One of the most essential components of the ELP is planning for future funding and support. As designated by the NCLI act of 2008 funding tampers off after the initial year of implementation and eventually reduces to 50% of total program expenses. The ELP outlines and anticipates future sources of funding for the state environmental literacy program. The ELP also considers how federal and state education-related legislation and initiatives such as IDEA or STEM funding will be integrated into the overall environmental literacy program.
