= National Association for Environmental Education =

Non-profit organizations in the United Kingdom

The UK National Association for Environmental Education (NAEE) is one of the earliest environmental education non-profit organizations in the United Kingdom formed in 1960 as the National Rural Studies Association, and since 1971 operating under its current name.

Its mission is promoting environmental education in all forms, as well as supporting educators in their work, to make the future of our planet more sustainable. It provides resources and training of teachers and non-formal educators interested in teaching sustainability in their classes and developing a sustainability-oriented curriculum, in particular focusing on early education, and with a particular emphasis on local context education. It is the only association in the UK that is run by educators for their peers.

It is registered as a charity organization and publishes a triannual practitioner journal, Environmental Education. Since 2017 NAEE is running a fellowship program in recognition of individuals, who make a contribution to environmental education. It is also offering bursaries to carry out outdoors environmental education.

Its current President is Justin Dillon, Professor of Science and Environmental Education at University College London. The board of trustees is chaired by Paul Vare, and Nina Hatch is Executive Director.
