= ICEE =

ICEE may refer to:

== Conferences ==
- International Conference on Electrical Engineering organized by the International Association of Engineers
- International Conference on Emerging Electronics organized by the IEEE
- International Conference on Emission Electronics organized by the IEEE
- Fourth International Conference on Environmental Education (ICEE), an environmental conference held in Ahmedabad, India in November 2007

International Conference on Environmental Ergonomics organized by the International Society of Environmental Ergonomics

- International Conference on Environmental Enrichment organized by the volunteer organization Shape of Enrichment, Inc.
- Fourth International Conference on Environmental Education

== Companies and other organizations ==
- The Icee Company - The Icee Company (previously Western Icee and Icee USA) is an American beverage company located in La Vergne, Tennessee, United States.
- The Innovation Cluster for Entrepreneurship Education of the Erasmus+ Programme
- The Institute for Community and Economic Engagement at the University of North Carolina at Greensboro
- The International Committee for Exhibitions and Exchanges of the International Council of Museums

== Other uses ==
- The Innovation, Collaboration and Exchange Environment of the Defence Research and Development Canada government agency
- Instrument Concepts for Europa Exploration of the Europa Multiple-Flyby Mission (also known as the Europa Clipper)
- ICE-E, a brand mascot originating in the video game Undertale, and reappearing in its successor Deltarune
