= United Nations Conference on the Human Environment =

UN conference held at Stockholm in 1972

The United Nations Conference on the Human Environment was held in Stockholm, Sweden, during June 5–16, 1972.

When the United Nations General Assembly decided to convene the 1972 Stockholm Conference, taking up the offer of the Government of Sweden to host it, UN secretary-general U Thant invited Maurice Strong to lead it as Secretary-General of the Conference, as the Canadian diplomat (under Pierre Trudeau) had initiated and already worked for over two years on the project.

The United Nations Environment Programme (UNEP) was created as a result of this conference.

== Introduction ==
Sweden first suggested to the United Nations Economic and Social Council (ECOSOC) in 1968 the idea of having a UN conference to focus on human interactions with the environment. ECOSOC passed resolution 1346 supporting the idea. General Assembly Resolution 2398 in 1969 decided to convene a conference in 1972 and mandated a set of reports from the UN secretary-general suggesting that the conference focus on "stimulating and providing guidelines for action by national government and international organizations" facing environmental issues. Preparations for the conference were extensive, lasting four years, including 114 governments, and costing over $30,000,000. A regional conference in Europe took place in 1971 in Prague under the auspices of the UNECE.

== Issues at the Conference ==
The Soviet Union and other Warsaw Pact nations boycotted the conference due to the lack of inclusion of East Germany, which was not allowed to participate. Neither East or West Germany were members of the UN at that time, as they had not yet accepted each other as states (which they agreed upon later by signing the Basic Treaty in December 1972).

The conference was not welcomed by countries like Britain, the US, Italy, Belgium, the Netherlands and France, which formed the so-called Brussels Group and attempted to stifle the impact of the conference.

At the conference itself, divisions between developed and developing countries began to emerge. The Chinese delegation issued a 17-point memorandum condemning United States policies in Indochina, as well as around the world. This stance emboldened other developing countries, which made up 70 of the 122 countries attending. Multiple countries including Pakistan, Peru, and Chile issued statements that were anti-colonial in nature, further worrying the United States delegation. So harsh was the criticism that Rogers Morton, at that time Secretary of the Interior, remarked "I wish the Russians were here", to divert the attention of the Chinese criticisms. China being a new member of the United Nations did not take part in the preparational talks. To include their views they reopened at the conference the declaration, which was negotiated at the preparational talks, introducing text to counter language of the declaration regarding population as a threat to the environment and cause of its degradation.

In 1972, environmental governance was not seen as an international priority, particularly for the Global South. Developing nations supported the creation of the UNEP, not because they supported environmental governance, but because of its headquarters' location in Nairobi, Kenya, as the UNEP would be the first UN agency to be based in a developing country.

== Stockholm Declaration ==
The meeting agreed upon a Declaration containing 26 principles concerning the environment and development, an Action Plan with 109 recommendations, and a Resolution.

Principles of the Stockholm Declaration:

1. Natural resources must be safeguarded
2. The Earth's capacity to produce renewable resources must be maintained
3. Wildlife must be safeguarded
4. Non-renewable resources must be shared and not exhausted
5. Pollution must not exceed the environment's capacity to clean itself
6. Damaging oceanic pollution must be prevented
7. Development is needed to improve the environment
8. Developing countries therefore need assistance
9. Developing countries need reasonable prices for exports to carry out environmental management
10. Environment policy must not hamper development
11. Developing countries need money to develop environmental safeguards
12. Integrated development planning is needed
13. Rational planning should resolve conflicts between environment and development
14. Human settlements must be planned to eliminate environmental problems
15. Governments should plan their own appropriate population policies
16. National institutions must plan development of states' natural resources
17. Science and technology must be used to improve the environment
18. Environmental education is essential
19. Environmental research must be promoted, particularly in developing countries
20. States may exploit their resources as they wish but must not endanger others
21. Compensation is due to states thus endangered
22. Each nation must establish its own standards
23. There must be cooperation on international issues
24. International organizations should help to improve the environment
25. Weapons of mass destruction must be eliminated

One of the seminal issues that emerged from the conference is the recognition for poverty alleviation for protecting the environment. The Indian Prime Minister Indira Gandhi in her seminal speech in the conference brought forward the connection between ecological management and poverty alleviation.

The Stockholm Conference motivated countries around the world to monitor environmental conditions as well as to create environmental ministries and agencies. Despite these institutional accomplishments, including the establishment of UNEP, the failure to implement most of its action programme has prompted the UN to have follow-up conferences. The succeeding United Nations Conference on Environment and Development convened in Rio de Janeiro in 1992 (the Rio Earth Summit), the 2002 World Summit on Sustainable Development in Johannesburg and the 2012 United Nations Conference on Sustainable Development (Rio+20) all take their starting point in the declaration of the Stockholm Conference.

Some argue that this conference, and more importantly the scientific conferences preceding it, had a real impact on the environmental policies of the European Community (that later became the European Union). For example, in 1973, the EU created the Environmental and Consumer Protection Directorate, and composed the first Environmental Action Program. Such increased interest and research collaboration arguably paved the way for further understanding of global warming, which has led to such agreements as the Kyoto Protocol and the Paris Agreement, and has given a foundation of modern environmentalism.

== 50 years after ==
In 2022 a report called "Stockholm+50: Unlocking a Better Future" was published by a team of scientists, analyzing the changes made from the United Nations Conference on the Human Environment in 1972 and giving recommendations for the future. The key messages are; "Redefine the relationship between humans and nature, achieve lasting prosperity for all, and invest in a better future." In addition, youth researchers issued a youth version of the report, called: "Charting a Youth Vision for a Just and Sustainable Future" also making some recommendations. The key messages are: "Health well being and communal solidarity, living in harmony with nature, international solidarity-living as one global family, a world when all humans are equal."

== See also ==
- Earth Summit 1992
- Earth Summit 2002
- Johannesburg Declaration
- Habitat International Coalition
- United Nations Climate Change Conference 2009
- United Nations Conference on Sustainable Development
- Minamata and Minamata disease
- World Environment Day
