= The Journal of Environmental Education =

Academic journal on environmental and sustainability education

- Discipline: Environmental Education
- Language: English
- Edited by: Alberto "Tico" Arenas

Publication details
- Former name(s): Environmental Education
- History: 1969–present
- Publisher: Routledge
- Frequency: Bimonthly
- Open access: Hybrid
- Impact factor: 3.1 (2022)

Standard abbreviations
- ISO 4: J. Environ. Educ.

Indexing
- ISSN: 0095-8964 (print); 1940-1892 (web)
- LCCN: 77618101
- OCLC no.: 67128393

Links
- Journal homepage; Online access; Online archive

The Journal of Environmental Education is a bimonthly peer-reviewed academic journal focusing on environmental and sustainability education. It covers formal, non-formal, and informal education at all levels: early childhood, primary, secondary, and tertiary education. It is published by Routledge and the editor-in-chief is Alberto "Tico" Arenas (University of Arizona).

== History ==
The journal was established in 1969 by Clarence "Clay" Schoenfeld (University of Wisconsin–Madison) as Environmental Education obtaining its current title in 1971.

=== Editors-in-chief ===
The following persons are or have been editors-in-chief:
- Clarence “Clay” Schoenfeld, University of Wisconsin, Madison (1969–1975)
- Mathew J. Brennan, Brentree Environmental Center (1975–1979)
- Robert E. Roth, Ohio State University (1975–1991)
- Roderick Nash, University of California, Santa Barbara (1976–1988)
- Robert S. Cook, Colorado State University (1979–1991)
- David Hanselman, State University of New York (1988–1991)
- John C. Miles, Western Washington University (1991–1999)
- Alan Ewert, United States Forest Service, University of Northern British Columbia (1991–1999)
- John R. Paulk, Tennessee Valley Authority, Global Network Environmental Education Centers (1991–1996)
- Harold R. Hungerford, Southern Illinois University (1997–2006)
- Deborah Simmons, Northern Illinois University/University of Oregon (2000–2009)
- E. Paul Hart, University of Regina (2000–2020)
- Jerry Culen, University of Florida (2006–2010)
- Robert B. Stevenson, State University of New York at Buffalo/James Cook University (2008–2020)
- John Shultis, University of Northern British Columbia (2009–2019)
- Alberto "Tico" Arenas, University of Arizona (2019–present)

== Abstracting and indexing ==
The journal is abstracted and indexed in:

- Aquatic Sciences and Fisheries Abstracts
- Current Contents/Social and Behavioral Sciences
- EBSCO databases
- Education Resources Information Center
- International Bibliography of Periodical Literature
- ProQuest databases
- PsycINFO
- Scopus
- Social Sciences Citation Index

According to the Journal Citation Reports, the journal has a 2022 impact factor of 3.1.
