= Johannesburg Declaration =

Sustainability agreement

The Johannesburg Declaration on Sustainable Development was adopted at the World Summit on Sustainable Development (WSSD), at which the Plan of Implementation of the World Summit on Sustainable Development was also agreed upon.

The Johannesburg Declaration builds on earlier declarations made at the United Nations Conference on the Human Environment at Stockholm in 1972, and the Earth Summit in Rio de Janeiro in 1992. While committing the nations of the world to sustainable development, it also includes substantial mention of multilateralism as the path forward.

In terms of the political commitment of parties, the Declaration is a more general statement than the Rio Declaration. It is an agreement to focus particularly on "the worldwide conditions that pose severe threats to the sustainable development of our people, which include: chronic hunger; malnutrition; foreign occupation; armed conflict; illicit drug problems; organized crime; corruption; natural disasters; illicit arms trafficking; trafficking in persons; terrorism; intolerance and incitement to racial, ethnic, religious and other hatreds; xenophobia; and endemic, communicable and chronic diseases, in particular HIV/AIDS, malaria and tuberculosis."
