= No Child Left Inside (movement) =

American environmental education movement

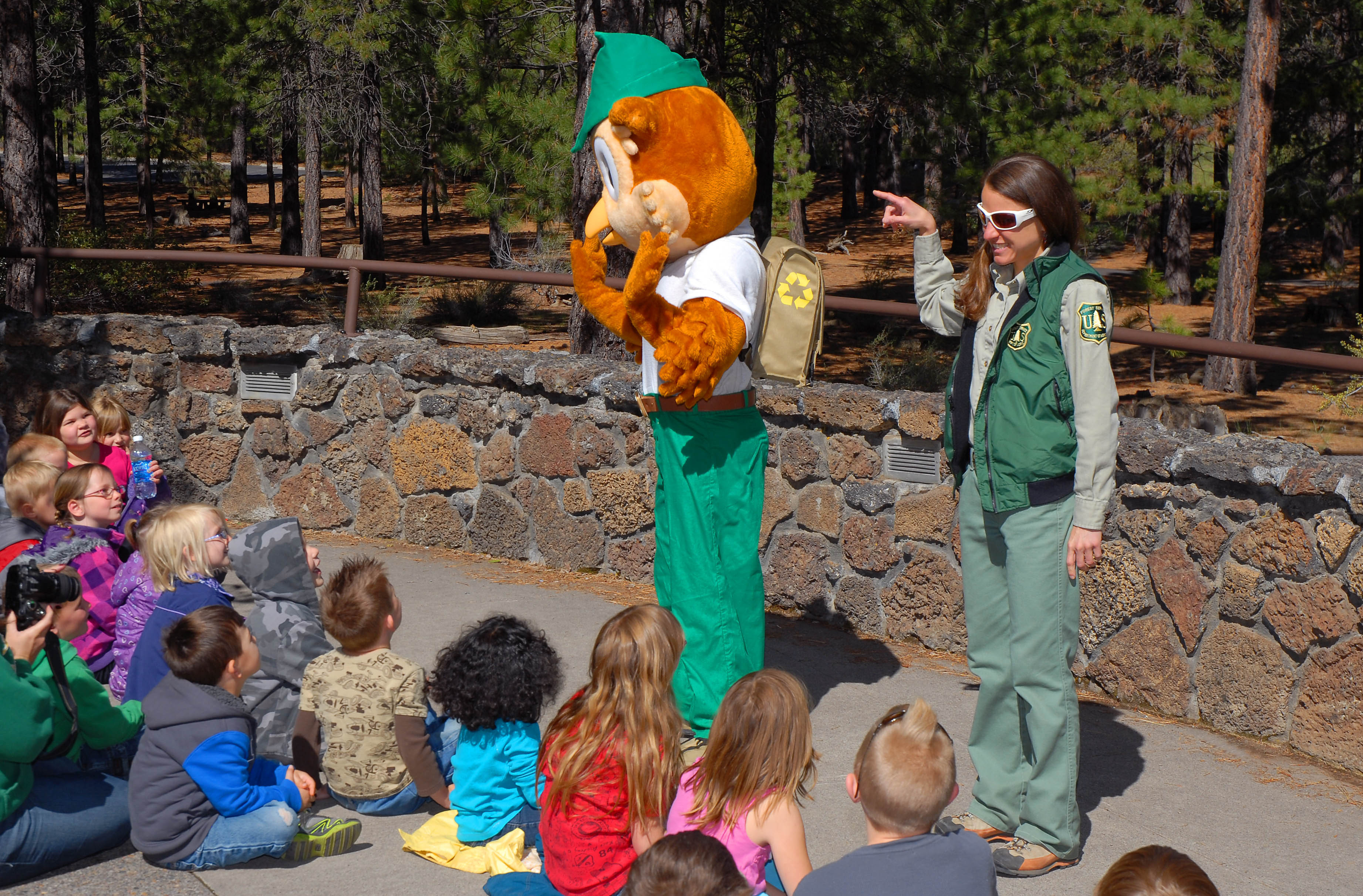
Youth outdoor education at Deschutes National Forest

The No Child Left Inside movement in the United States seeks to encourage and provide funding for environmental education. Its stated goals include the enhancement of environmental literacy between kindergarten and 12th grade and fostering of understanding, analysis, and solutions to environmental challenges.

Two US legislative bills were introduced during the 2000s using the phrase "No Child Left Inside."

== Background ==
The 2005 Richard Louv book Last Child in the Woods: Saving Our Children From Nature-Deficit Disorder created an increased interest in children's environmental awareness. As of 2007, the aims of the No Child Left Inside Coalition had been endorsed by 58 organizations including the Sierra Club, the National Audubon Society, and the National Wildlife Federation.

The No Child Left Inside Coalition, sponsored by the Chesapeake Bay Foundation, counted 2,097 members in 2011, which included a variety of US schools, botanical gardens, arboretums, zoos, museums, and other organizations.

== Legislation ==
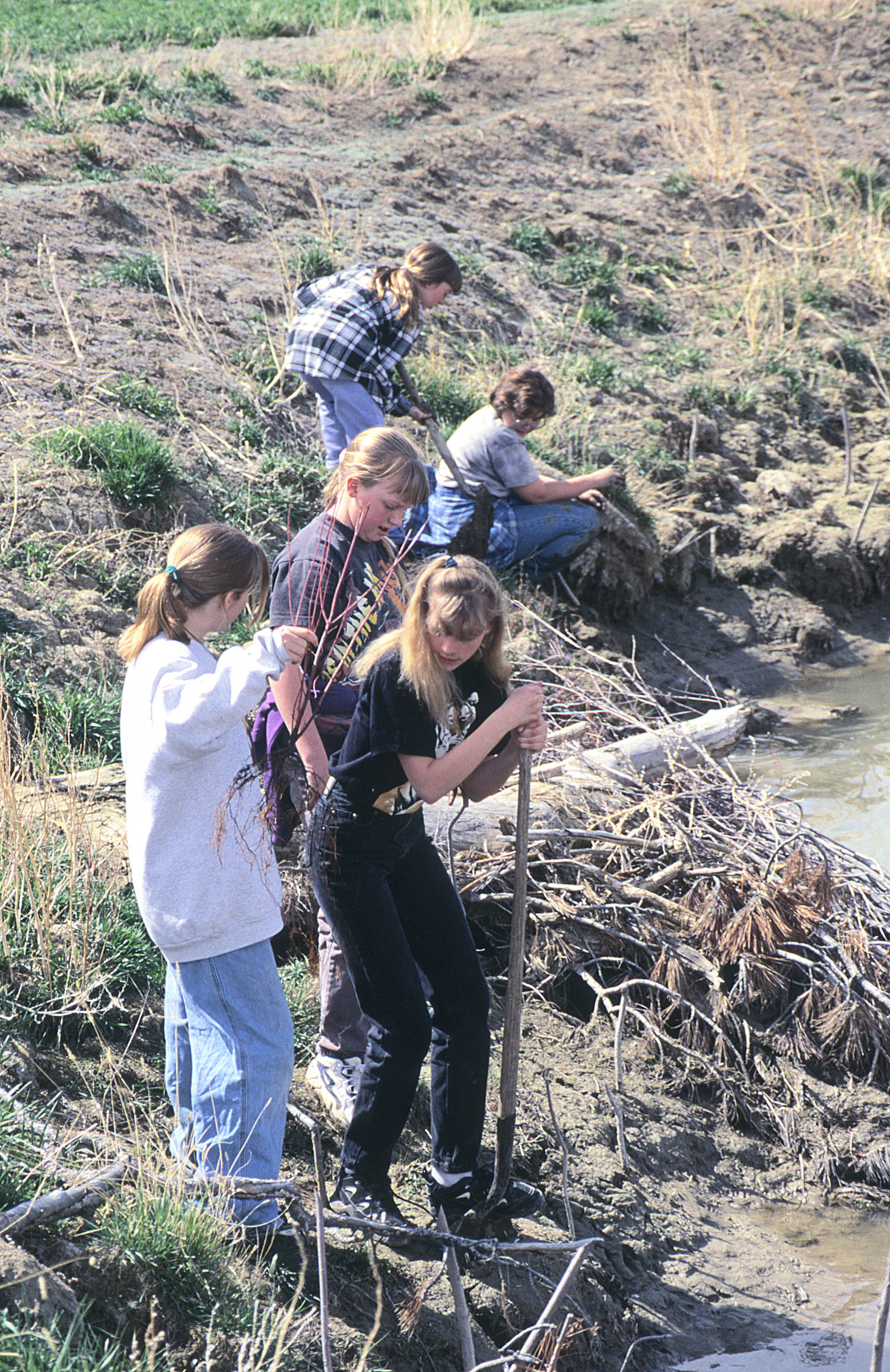
Conservation Education

In the United States, the movement seeks to encourage and provide funding for environmental education. Several states, including Connecticut, Colorado, Illinois, Massachusetts, and Wisconsin, endorsed the movement by creating programs in local parks and schools that addressed the concern of children's disconnect with nature during the 2000s. A federal bill, the No Child Left Inside Act of 2009, was introduced in the House of Representatives on April 22, 2009 (Earth Day) by representative John P. Sarbanes (Democrat, MD-3), with 82 co-sponsors, as H.R.2054 and referred to the House Committee on Education and Labor. A similar measure, the No Child Left Inside Act of 2008 (H.R. 3036 , 110th Congress) was passed by the House of Representatives on September 18, 2008, but was never voted on in the Senate. The bill was introduced in the Senate as S.866 by senator Jack Reed (Democrat, Rhode Island) with 17 co-sponsors and was referred to the Senate Committee on Health, Education, Labor, and Pensions. On June 4, 2009, the bill was referred to the Subcommittee on Early Childhood, Elementary, and Secondary Education. The main goal of the proposed legislation is to amend the Elementary and Secondary Education Act (No Child Left Behind Act) of 2001 under the Bush Administration with environmental education.

The federal bill proposed that appropriations be provided to train teachers for such instruction, provide innovative technology, and to develop studies assessing the worth of these programs in elementary and secondary school curricula. While mainly addressing environmental literacy, this legislation also seeks to touch on healthy living programs encouraging outdoor recreation and sound nutrition. Developed programs will include funding for curriculum changes as well as field trips to local environmental areas of interest.

A second bill (H.R. 2702), also sponsored by Sarbanes, was proposed during 2013. It received bipartisan support from US Senators Mark Kirk and Jack Reed and from United States House of Representatives member Mike Fitzpatrick.

== See also ==
- Environmental Literacy Plan
