= New Jersey School of Conservation =

The New Jersey School of Conservation (NJSOC) is an Environmental Education center located in Stokes State Forest in Sussex County, New Jersey. It is currently under the management of the Friends of the New Jersey School of Conservation, through an agreement with the New Jersey Department of Environmental Protection. The NJSOC was founded in 1949, and occupies facilities in Stokes State Forest built by the Civilian Conservation Corps in the 1930s.

The mission of the New Jersey School of Conservation is to develop in its program participants knowledge of how Earth systems operate and how human actions affect these systems. It is intended that this knowledge will cultivate the prolonged performance of environmentally responsible behaviors and the development of self-confidence to support the development of attitudes, beliefs, and values that will aid individuals and groups alike in the resolution of current environmental problems, the avoidance of future environmental problems, and the quest for sustainable development

The environmental SOC education programs have provide field experiences in the environmental sciences, humanities, outdoor pursuits, and the social sciences. In its early history NJSOC provided environmental education programs for nearly 9,000 elementary/secondary school students per year, and nearly 1,000 teachers from about 100 schools, and more recently to 4000 students per year.

On May 14, 2020, Montclair State University announced it would close the NJSOC as a result of the financial impact of the COVID-19 pandemic, and lack of State appropriations for NJSOC's operating or capital expenses, which ceased after 2010. The School temporarily closed on June 30, 2020. As of September 1, 2020, management of the land and buildings returned to the New Jersey Department of Environmental Protection. In May, 2021 the Friends of the New Jersey School of Conservation reopened the NJSOC for events.
