= Fourth International Conference on Environmental Education =

The Tbilisiplus30 or the Fourth International Conference on Environmental Education was held at the Centre for Environment Education, Ahmedabad, India between November 24, 2007, and November 28, 2007.

The conference was the fourth in the series of Conferences on environmental education held since the first international conference in Tbilisi (former USSR). The second conference was organised in 1977 in Moscow; and the third conference was held in Thessaloniki in 1997. The United Nations has declared the decade 2005 to 2014 as the "Decade of Education for Sustainable Development" (DESD). This conference underlined the key role of education in achieving sustainable development. The participants and delegates from countries across the globe came together to bridge the gap between environmental education and Education for Sustainable Development. They examined the development of environmental education since the first conference, thirty years ago, and set a global agenda for the DESD. This will be a platform for sharing practices and ideas on initiatives in environmental education throughout the world.

There was a significant amount of participation in workshops on topics including "Education for Sustainable Development" and "Teacher Education," research for DESD, "DESD Monitoring and Evaluation," "ESD and Media," "Man and Biosphere Reserves" and "World Heritage Sites" as learning sites for environmental development, "Floods and Disaster Reduction" and "Education for Sustainable Consumption".
