= Declaration of the United Nations Conference on the Human Environment =

1972 UN declaration on the global environment

The Stockholm Declaration
Declaration of the United Nations Conference on the Human Environment
- Type: Environmental Law
- Drafted: 5–16 June 1972
- Location: Stockholm, Sweden
- Signatories: 114 countries

The Stockholm Declaration of 1972, or the Declaration of the United Nations Conference on the Human Environment, was the first United Nations declaration on the global environment. It consists of 26 principles and led to the creation of the United Nations Environment Programme (UNEP), which laid the foundation for future global environmental governance. The United Nations Conference on the Human Environment was held in Stockholm, Sweden, from 5 to 16 June 1972. The 1972 United Nations Conference on the Human Environment signifies the first international effort to place environmental issues at the forefront of global concerns. The conference sought to recognize the finite nature of Earth's resources and human impacts on the environment. It represented the beginning of a global dialogue on the link between economic growth, environmental pollution, and the well-being of humanity. The Stockholm Declaration urged the signatory nations to reduce air, land, and water degradation by integrating science and technology in their development plans. It also called on nations to create regulations on wildlife protection, environmental conservation, and population control. While the reception of the ideas in the Declaration were generally positive, it received criticisms on its practical implementation, especially from developing nations.

== History ==
=== Background ===
During the Cold War of the 1960s, Sweden was not a NATO member, but due to its geography, it was particularly vulnerable to environmental problems. These accumulating factors motivated Sweden to propose the Stockholm Conference in 1967. The Soviet Union, the other members of the Eastern bloc, most Western European countries, and the United States all supported Sweden's proposal. However, the United Kingdom and France were concerned that developing countries might use the conference to garner more financial support from formal colonial powers. Developing countries were also wary that Northern countries' interests would control the discussions, and use environmental issues to hinder their economic development.

In December 1968, the United Nations General Assembly agreed to convene in 1972 with the adoption of Resolution 2398(XXIII). One of the primary aims was to establish a declaration on the human environment. The declaration was based on the proposal by the United Nations Educational, Scientific and Cultural Organization (UNESCO) to create a "Universal Declaration on the Protection and Preservation of the Human Environment". This declaration can be traced to the Intergovernmental Conference of Experts on the Scientific Basis for Rational Use and Conservation of the Resources of the Biosphere, which was convened in Paris by UNESCO in September 1968. The Application of Science and Technology to Development, the U.N. Advisory Committee, and the Secretary General seconded this notion, and the General Assembly and the Economic and Social Council endorsed the Secretary-General's recommendation.

=== Creation and drafting ===
In 1971, General Assembly Resolution 2581 created a 27-nation preparatory committee, whose goal was to produce a declaration concerning the "rights and obligations of citizens and Governments with regard to the preservation and improvement of the human environment" as outlined in a recommendation by the Secretary-General. The conference secretariat, Maurice Strong, was responsible for the preparation and organization of the conference.

An Intergovernmental Working Group was established in the committee's second session. The consensus was for the Declaration to be "inspirational and concise", and to be easily comprehensible by the public as a means for education, public awareness, and community participation to protect the environment. The members of the Committee agreed that the Declaration should only list "broad goals and objectives", and the conference should adopt an in-depth action program outlined by supporting documents.

Initially, the Working Group drafted a preamble and 17 fundamental principles. This initial draft faced heavy criticism from the Preparatory Committee due to the view that the draft was an instrument to promote "restrictive, anti-developmental and 'conservationist' policies." In response to the feedback, the Group created a new document with a preamble and 23 principles. This draft was presented at the Conference without further discussion in the committee.

=== Presentation at the Conference ===
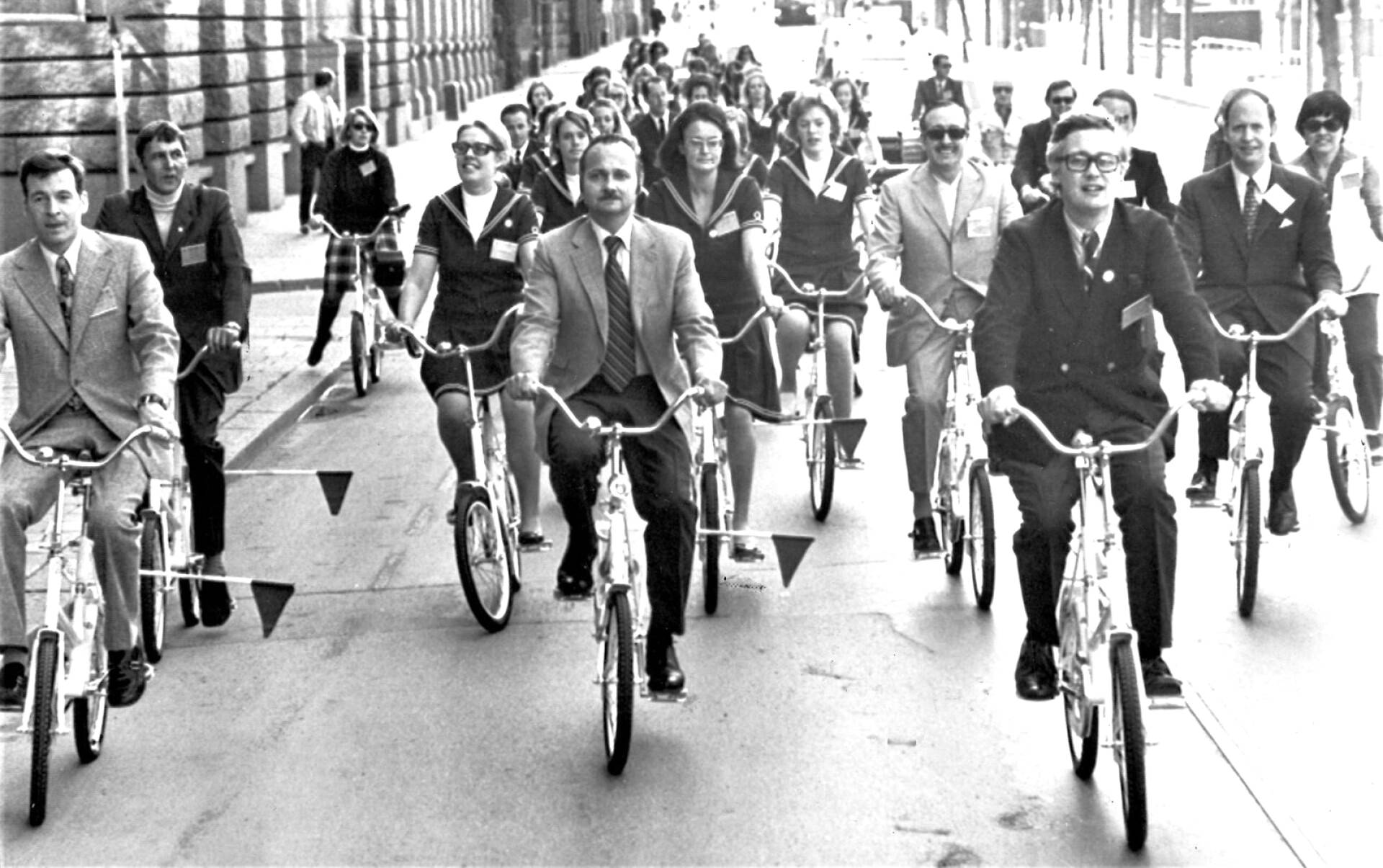
Delegates rode bicycles in Stockholm, here led by Maurice Strong.

The debate at the Stockholm Conference was headed by Maurice F. Strong, the former President of the Canadian International Development Agency. In the general debate, many speakers highlighted the significance of the Declaration and several, including Strong, rallied for the adoption of the Declaration without further changes to preserve the agreements reached in pre-Conference consultation sessions. However, while some speakers were willing to accept the draft, they also highlighted the text's lack of attention to developing nations' needs. Developing countries stressed that developed nations should not use environmental concerns as an excuse for imposing development restrictions. They argued that developed nations exploited the greatest amount of resources and contributed most of the pollution to the global environment. In contrast, developing countries suffered the burden of a degrading environment, debt, and economic underdevelopment. The Global South countries argued that the Global North should bear most of the responsibility in environmental protection. Furthermore, some countries asserted that they reserved the right to alter the text, as they were not included in the preparatory process.

Following the debate, China requested a Working Group. They proposed that in order to solve environmental issues, developing countries needed to develop their economies, and to industrialize to improve productivity. This notion was amended by Iran. The Conference created a working group, which resulted in a series of amendment requests. After an all-night session and under the leadership of Taieb Slim, T. C. Bacon, Hans Blix, along with Strong and his associates, a final draft was formed on the last day of the Conference.

=== Result ===
The draft resolution was adopted by 103 votes to none, with 12 abstentions from South Africa and the Soviet bloc. On 15 December 15 1972 the General Assembly adopted the text under Resolution 2994 with 112 votes to none, and 10 abstentions. The Declaration was not altered in the Assembly to preserve the agreement achieved at Stockholm.

A major topic at the Conference was institutional expansion, which came to reality with the creation of the United Nations Environmental Program by General Assembly Resolution 2997. Under the Action Plan, Earthwatch was established as an environmental assessment body to measure and identify global environmental issues as well as to forecast potential crises.

== Implementation ==
While the reception of the Declaration was generally positive, there was some criticism about the practicality of its implementation. All countries agreed on the proposal during the Conference but many failed to continue implementing their formulated promises. A year after the Stockholm Conference, it was recognised that better implementation of the declaration required technological, industrial and economic changes globally.

The logo of United Nations Environmental Programme

Tony Brenton and Maurice Strong highlighted the implications for nation-states within the international system, noting that states would not easily forgo their sovereignty and enter collective agreements with other nations, making international environmental action difficult. Tony Brenton argued that nations are preoccupied with promoting their own interests rather than preserving the commons. This idea of the nation-state has affected the outcomes of environmental agreements throughout history.

The implementation varied from country to country, for many reasons, with developing countries requiring facilitation and access to innovative technology, which was only possible through cooperation with more developed countries. To achieve the solutions outlined in the conference, a more international cooperative attitude was required. Additionally, the implementation of the Stockholm Declaration encouraged both developed and developing nations to increase their pursuit of new directions for economic growth, and especially approaches that were less energy-intensive, less dependent on non-renewable resources and more focused on reusing and recycling.

The implementation was also challenged by a lack of funding. The UNEP is a UN Programme established after the Stockholm Declaration to coordinate and promote environmental cooperation. However, UNEP was forced to rely on voluntary financial contributions from a few countries. Funding is limited and inconsistent. UNEP's 2010 annual budget was only $217 million, compared with $4 billion for the World Food Programme and nearly $4.8 billion for the United Nations Development Programme (UNDP).

On the positive side, the implementation of the Stockholm Conference led to the creation of an action plan that consisted of three pillars. Firstly, an Earthwatch Programme to identify problems of international significance to warn against impending environmental crises; second, recommendations concerning environmental management; lastly, supporting measures such as education, training and public information. The implementation also resulted in the enactment of three international conventions, in London and Washington D.C. which dealt with environmental issues such as waste dumping in oceans, preservation of heritage sites and limiting international trade in certain wildlife species.

=== Implementation in specific regions ===
==== The European Union ====
The principles and goals set at the Stockholm Conference provided a higher standard for the European Council to combat environmental issues. At the Paris Summit 1972, the Heads of State and of Governments acknowledged the theme of the Stockholm Conference. This became the origin of the community environmental policy in Europe and led to the establishment of the Environmental Unit (predecessor of the Directorate-General for Environment).

On 22 November 1973, the Council of Ministers approved the first four-year Environment Action Programme (1973-1976) in Europe to "reduce pollution and nuisances; improve the environment and quality of life; and promote common community action by member states, in international organizations dealing with the environment".

==== China ====
China, which joined the United Nations in October 1971, became an "indispensable stakeholder in global environmental governance" after the Stockholm Conference 1972. China held its first national environmental conference in 1973, and its second national environmental protection conference to strengthen environmental management and pollution treatment in 1983. China also established the Council for the International Cooperation on Environment and Development (CCICED) to promote international environmental cooperation.

== Further discussions ==
=== International environmental law ===
The Stockholm Declaration had a clear impact on subsequent international environmental treaties, as it was the first major international treaty that framed environmental issues as global issues. Principle 21, which outlines states' sovereign rights to exercise in their territories and their responsibilities to prevent transboundary harm, serves as the legal core to the document.

As the first attempt to achieve global consensus, experts like Brenton consider the majority of the Declaration to be "useless for legal purposes" because of its vagueness. Most of the Declaration, apart from Principle 21, was written as policy statements rather than in legal language. The Declaration is also not legally binding, and it was considered as a soft law at the international level. In addition, while many legal treaties formed secretariats and organizations to oversee compliance and implementation, the UNEP failed to do so due to a lack of funding and enforcement mechanisms. Consequently, states are not obligated to follow up on the agreement made at the Conference.

=== Cold War US-Soviet rivalry: The USSR and Eastern Bloc boycott ===
The ongoing political and ideological rivalry between the US and USSR and their respective allies continued to overshadow the tension in the international environment during the Stockholm Conference in 1972. The Cold War started in 1947. Sweden and other supporters of the conference hoped to use preparations for it to build bridges within a deeply fractured UN and viewed the Cold War from a position of political neutrality. It saw transboundary issues around environmental pollution as a potential catalyst for cooperation that could help boost the global importance of the UN. Even though the Soviet Union and the United States had supported the proposal during discussions in the UN General Assembly, the Geneva-based secretariat preparing the meeting had to strike a delicate balance between east and west. On 7 March 1972, the Soviet Union and Czechoslovakia boycotted the opening of the final United Nations preparatory session for the conference. The disagreement around the participation of East Germany and West Germany – neither country was a UN member state at the time – also resulted in a boycott by the Soviet Union and most Warsaw Pact nations in the Eastern Bloc. As a member of several United Nations agencies, West Germany was invited. East Germany was not invited because it was not a United Nations body member.

=== Developing countries at the Conference ===
Developing countries including India, Nigeria, and Brazil embraced the environmental actions, but noted concerns for potential hindrances on economic development. Indian prime minister Indira Gandhi asserted that "poverty is the worst form of pollution", encompassing a discursive framework that pitted Northern environmentalism against Southern development commitment that remain a prominent theme for the next forty years. Brazil believed that some environmental degradation should be allowed in developing nations, to allow for economic growth. Brazil emphasized that the Western industrialized countries should have taken the responsibility to address environmental issues, and no measures that restricted trade in the name of the environment, such as environmental requirements that would make goods more expensive, should be imposed. While discussing the need to inform other countries about ecological disasters, Brazil criticized any principles that could potentially violate national sovereignty. Brazilian delegates also believed that the United Nations had placed too much emphasis on emerging issues such as the environment, oceans, and space, which distracted the UN from its central role in peacemaking and economic development, especially in the Global South.

=== Non-State actors at the Conference ===
The Stockholm Conference was met with protests from a variety of groups such as scientists concerned with population growth, and also more radical alternative groups that had their own environmental campaigns and agendas. These protests were not disruptive or violent, but their presence suggested that some non-state participants were not aligned with the mainstream values and processes of the conference itself. These protests also set the norm for alternative environmental ideologies and countercultural beliefs that could co-exist with conventional models of development such as the Stockholm Conference.

== Follow up ==
=== The Rio Declaration ===
Between 3 and 14 June 1992, the United Nations Conference on Environment and Development (UNCED) met in Rio De Janeiro to reaffirm and build on the UN Conference on the Human Environment. Given that the Stockholm Conference had previously set the standard for future international environmental conferences, the Rio Declaration adopted three of the documents drafted in the Stockholm Declaration. For example, Principle 21 from the Declaration was modified and adopted into a customary international environmental law in the Rio Declaration (initially known as the Earth Charter). The aim of the Rio Declaration, which was a step forward from the Stockholm Declaration, was to create, clarify, and rearticulate principles that states can incorporate into their domestic legislation. The goal was that if enough states included the Declaration domestically, it might lead to the Declaration transforming into international law norms.

=== Stockholm+50 ===
From 2 to 3 June 2022, an international environmental meeting was planned for Stockholm, Sweden. Under the theme, "Stockholm+50: a healthy planet for the prosperity of all – our responsibility, our opportunity," this conference commemorated the first United Nations Conference on the Human Environment, and "celebrate 50 years of global environmental action."

== Principles of the Stockholm Declaration ==
The 26 principles are:

Principle 1

Man has the fundamental right to freedom, equality and adequate conditions of life, in an environment of a quality that permits a life of dignity and well-being, and he bears a solemn responsibility to protect and improve the environment for present and future generations. In this respect, policies promoting or perpetuating apartheid, racial segregation, discrimination, colonial and other forms of oppression and foreign domination stand condemned and must be eliminated.

Principle 2

The natural resources of the earth, including the air, water, land, flora and fauna and especially representative samples of natural ecosystems, must be safeguarded for the benefit of present and future generations through careful planning or management, as appropriate.

Principle 3

The capacity of the earth to produce vital renewable resources must be maintained and, wherever practicable, restored or improved.

Principle 4

Man has a special responsibility to safeguard and wisely manage the heritage of wildlife and its habitat, which are now gravely imperilled by a combination of adverse factors. Nature conservation, including wildlife, must therefore receive importance in planning for economic development.

Principle 5

The non-renewable resources of the earth must be employed in such a way as to guard against the danger of their future exhaustion and to ensure that benefits from such employment are shared by all mankind.

Principle 6

The discharge of toxic substances or of other substances and the release of heat, in such quantities or concentrations as to exceed the capacity of the environment to render them harmless, must be halted in order to ensure that serious or irreversible damage is not inflicted upon ecosystems. The just struggle of the peoples of ill countries against pollution should be supported.

Principle 7

States shall take all possible steps to prevent pollution of the seas by substances that are liable to create hazards to human health, to harm living resources and marine life, to damage amenities or to interfere with other legitimate uses of the sea.

Principle 8

Economic and social development is essential for ensuring a favorable living and working environment for man and for creating conditions on earth that are necessary for the improvement of the quality of life.

Principle 9

Environmental deficiencies generated by the conditions of under-development and natural disasters pose grave problems and can best be remedied by accelerated development through the transfer of substantial quantities of financial and technological assistance as a supplement to the domestic effort of the developing countries and such timely assistance as may be required.

Principle 10

For the developing countries, stability of prices and adequate earnings for primary commodities and raw materials are essential to environmental management, since economic factors as well as ecological processes must be taken into account.

Principle 11

The environmental policies of all States should enhance and not adversely affect the present or future development potential of developing countries, nor should they hamper the attainment of better living conditions for all, and appropriate steps should be taken by States and international organizations with a view to reaching agreement on meeting the possible national and international economic consequences resulting from the application of environmental measures.

Principle 12

Resources should be made available to preserve and improve the environment, taking into account the circumstances and particular requirements of developing countries and any costs which may emanate- from their incorporating environmental safeguards into their development planning and the need for making available to them, upon their request, additional international technical and financial assistance for this purpose.

Principle 13

In order to achieve a more rational management of resources and thus to improve the environment, States should adopt an integrated and coordinated approach to their development planning so as to ensure that development is compatible with the need to protect and improve environment for the benefit of their population.

Principle 14

Rational planning constitutes an essential tool for reconciling any conflict between the needs of development and the need to protect and improve the environment.

Principle 15

Planning must be applied to human settlements and urbanization with a view to avoiding adverse effects on the environment and obtaining maximum social, economic and environmental benefits for all. In this respect projects which arc designed for colonialist and racist domination must be abandoned.

Principle 16

Demographic policies which are without prejudice to basic human rights and which are deemed appropriate by Governments concerned should be applied in those regions where the rate of population growth or excessive population concentrations are likely to have adverse effects on the environment of the human environment and impede development.

Principle 17

Appropriate national institutions must be entrusted with the task of planning, managing or controlling the 9 environmental resources of States with a view to enhancing environmental quality.

Principle 18

Science and technology, as part of their contribution to economic and social development, must be applied to the identification, avoidance and control of environmental risks and the solution of environmental problems and for the common good of mankind.

Principle 19

Education in environmental matters, for the younger generation as well as adults, giving due consideration to the underprivileged, is essential in order to broaden the basis for an enlightened opinion and responsible conduct by individuals, enterprises and communities in protecting and improving the environment in its full human dimension. It is also essential that mass media of communications avoid contributing to the deterioration of the environment, but, on the contrary, disseminate information of an educational nature on the need to protect and improve the environment in order to enable man to develop in every respect.

Principle 20

Scientific research and development in the context of environmental problems, both national and multinational, must be promoted in all countries, especially the developing countries. In this connection, the free flow of up-to-date scientific information and transfer of experience must be supported and assisted, to facilitate the solution of environmental problems; environmental technologies should be made available to developing countries on terms which would encourage their wide dissemination without constituting an economic burden on the developing countries.

Principle 21

States have, in accordance with the Charter of the United Nations and the principles of international law, the sovereign right to exploit their own resources pursuant to their own environmental policies, and the responsibility to ensure that activities within their jurisdiction or control do not cause damage to the environment of other States or of areas beyond the limits of national jurisdiction.

Principle 22

States shall cooperate to develop further the international law regarding liability and compensation for the victims of pollution and other environmental damage caused by activities within the jurisdiction or control of such States to areas beyond their jurisdiction.

Principle 23

Without prejudice to such criteria as may be agreed upon by the international community, or to standards which will have to be determined nationally, it will be essential in all cases to consider the systems of values prevailing in each country, and the extent of the applicability of standards which are valid for the most advanced countries but which may be inappropriate and of unwarranted social cost for the developing countries.

Principle 24

International matters concerning the protection and improvement of the environment should be handled in a cooperative spirit by all countries, big and small, on an equal footing. Cooperation through multilateral or bilateral arrangements or other appropriate means is essential to effectively control, prevent, reduce and eliminate adverse environmental effects resulting from activities conducted in all spheres, in such a way that due account is taken of the sovereignty and interests of all States.

Principle 25

States shall ensure that international organizations play a coordinated, efficient and dynamic role for the protection and improvement of the environment.

Principle 26

Man and his environment must be spared the effects of nuclear weapons and all other means of mass destruction. States must strive to reach prompt agreement, in the relevant international organs, on the elimination and complete destruction of such weapons.
