= Leoncie =

Indian–Icelandic musician (born 1953)

Leoncia Maria Martin, known professionally as Leoncie, is an Indian–Icelandic musician. Her other stage names are Icy Spicy Leoncie and Indian Princess Leoncie.

== Life ==
Leoncie was born in Goa in India. She is of Indian and Portuguese descent (Goa was a Portuguese Colony until 1961). She studied music at Trinity College Of Music London. In 1982 she moved to Kópavogur, Iceland after marrying an Icelander, where she worked as an entertainer.

A singer-songwriter, she has been compared to Madonna and the Peruvian entertainer Tigresa del Oriente. In 2003, Morgunblaðið called her "one of the most unusual and controversial artists in the country." Icelandic musician Dr. Gunni said in 2015 "It is difficult to explain or describe Leoncie, or her cultural significance to foreigners. Perhaps she could be described as an un-ironic Icelandic/Indian version of Ru Paul?" In 2016, journalist Arnar Eggert Thoroddsen called her "the enfant terrible of Icelandic outsider music." She has appeared on the British shows The X Factor and Eurotrash.

== Discography ==
- My Icelandic Man (1985)
- Story from Brooklyn (1992)
- Love Message from Overseas (2001 or 2003)
- Sexy Loverboy (2002)
- Invisible Girl (2005)
- Radio Rapist-Wrestler (2005)
- Pukki Bollywood Baby (2008)
- Wild American Sheriff (2009)
- Dansaðu við Leoncie (2011)
- Gay World (2012)
- Mr. Lusty (2017)
