= Learnscapes =

Learnscapes are defined as “places where a learning program has been designed to permit users to interact with the environment”. Their purpose is to promote and extend environmental awareness, by presenting biodiversity as the basis for environmental conservation and ecologically sustainable development. This is achieved through developing school based curricula that "engage students interactively with their surrounding environment". Ideally, learnscapes incorporate educational, environmental and social outcomes that reflect the character of the community as well as the school site.

"A Learnscape feature, whether it be an outdoor classroom, worm farm, bush regeneration, recycling area, frog pond or herb garden, is not a Learnscape itself. It is the collaborative process within which the feature is created and plans for how it will be maintained and used for learning once it is created that make the feature a Learnscape".

Learncape programs also have a “calming effect” on classes, by invoking deeper relationships between students and their teachers.
