= North American Association for Environmental Education =

US-based nonprofit organization

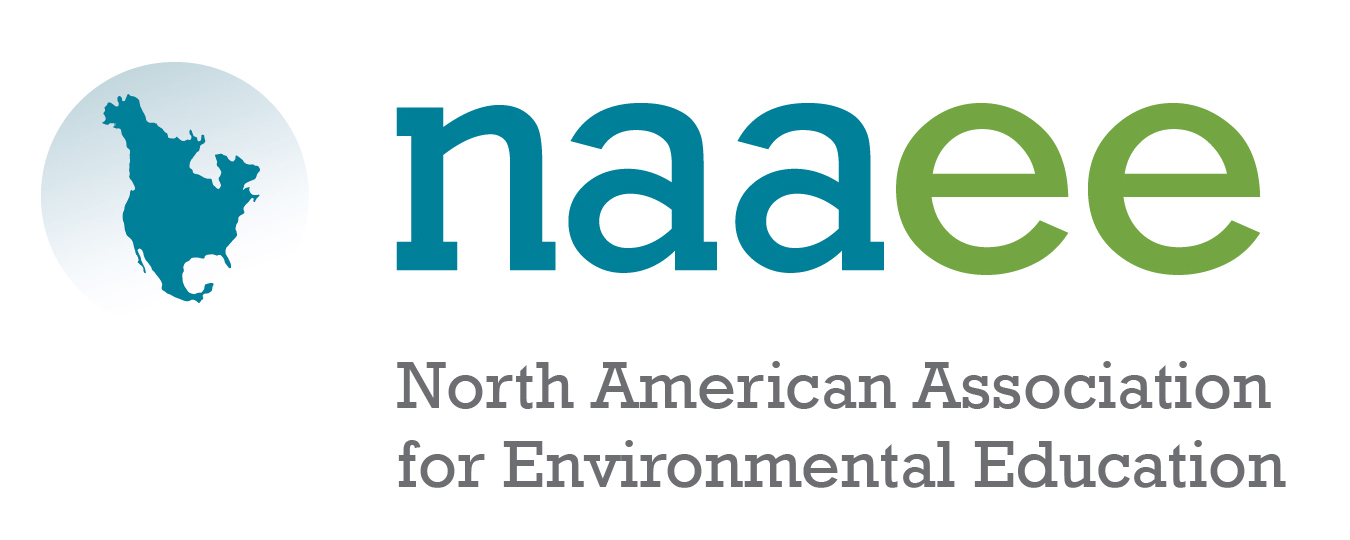
- Abbreviation: NAAEE
- Formation: 1971; 48 years ago
- Founder: Dr. Robert McCabe
- Founded at: Miami Dade College
- Type: Nonprofit
- Purpose: Environmental Education; Environmental Advocacy; Environmental Literacy
- Headquarters: Washington, D.C.
- Methods: Driving Excellence; Cultivating Collective Impact; Mobilizing Support
- Members: 20,000
- Executive Director: Judy Braus
- Affiliations: Global Environmental Education Partnership; Natural Start Alliance
- Website: naaee.org
- Formerly called: National Association for Environmental Education

The North American Association for Environmental Education (NAAEE) is a US-based nonprofit organization that uses education to advance environmental education and civic engagement.

The organization was founded in 1971 in the U.S. as the National Association for Environmental Education but now includes members from over 30 countries.

NAAEE and its 56 affiliate organizations in the US, Canada and Mexico have over 20,000 members; additional affiliates exist outside North America in Asia and Oceania. These partners, many of whom operate at a state or provincial level, have their own conferences, publications, or other activities.

NAAEE holds its own annual conference, supports teacher training in environmental education, supports research demonstrating the impact of environmental education, and produces a wide variety of publications, including Guidelines for Excellence in environmental education.

The Natural Start Alliance, a project of NAAEE, works to connect young children with nature.
