= Project Learning Tree =

Project Learning Tree (PLT) is an environmental education program for teaching children about trees and forests using hands-on activities. It was created in 1976, after the passage of the first National Environmental Education Act in 1970 and celebration of the first Earth Day in 1970, raised the profile of environmental education in the United States.

It was the first of several "Project" environmental education programs developed around that time, and still in use in the 21st century, that use aspects of the environment to teach broader subjects and skills. Project Wild, which uses wildlife as its focus, was conceived in 1979 and launched in 1983. Project Wet began in 1984 with a focus on water. PLT's curricula and programs "use the forest as a window on the world to increase students understanding of our environment; stimulate students' critical and creative thinking [skills]; develop students ability to make informed decisions on environmental issues; and instill in students the commitment to take responsible action on behalf of the environment." PLT provides professional development to educators. More than half a million educators have attended workshops to learn how to use PLT materials since 1976 in the U.S. and U.S. Territories, Japan, Mexico, El Salvador, Sweden, Slovakia, Ukraine, China, Finland, Brazil, Jordan, and the Philippines. State agencies, like Ohio's Department of Natural Resources and Peace Corps volunteers also use PLT activities with youth around the world.

== History ==
In 1970, Rudy Schafer, an environmental education specialist in the California Department of Education in Sacramento, received funding from the Office of Environmental Education in the then-U.S. Office of Education to hold a meeting to enable state-level education and resource management professionals to share information about how to teach about the environment. Shafer invited two representatives each from 13 western states to a meeting in Seattle in 1970—one who worked in a state-level education agency and one who worked in a state-level natural resource agency. The group called itself the Western Regional Environmental Education Council. At WREEC's third meeting in Santa Fe, New Mexico, in 1973, two staff members from the American Forest Institute, a national association funded by forest products companies and since organized as the American Forest Foundation, attended and proposed that WREEC develop a forest-based, environmental education curriculum that AFI would fund. After some discussion, WREEC members agreed "but only if we could build a credible, bias-free program based on strong pedagogical principles." A small PLT staff coordinated writing workshops where teachers and resource professionals drafted and pre-tested what became an activity guide with 75 activities, entitled Project Learning Tree: Supplementary Curriculum Guide for Kindergarten through Grade 6. The guide has been continually revised and updated since the mid-1970s, most recently in 2006, but it still has many of the same elements from the original publication.

== Content and evaluations ==
Each activity includes suggested grade levels, subjects addressed, materials and time considerations, learning objectives, and assessment opportunities. The guides now include Early Childhood, PreK-8, an Energy & Society kit (grades 4–8), and Secondary (grades 9–12) versions and have been correlated to most states' standards, and to national standards in science and social studies. The North American Association for Environmental Education found that PLT complies with its six guidelines for excellence in environmental education, developed in 1996 and revised in 2004 and 2009. PLT's curriculum materials are arranged under five major science themes (diversity, interrelationships, systems, structure and scale, and patterns of change) and employ storylines to connect concepts and transcend traditional subject areas. PLT activities use experiential learning methods and inquiry-based investigations of environmental issues for teaching science and other core subjects. PLT has been cited as a best practices resource for pre-service teachers learning to plan and teach effective science lessons. The State Education and Environment Roundtable studied the impact on student achievement from using the "environment as an integrating concept (EIC)." In studies in 2000 and 2005 that compared schools in California where EIC was and was not used, treatment students performed better on a number of standardized tests than control students. These studies did not specifically look at the PLT curriculum, but they do confirm the validity of using the environment as a focus for the teaching of traditional school subjects.

A formal evaluation of PLT on the national level took place in 1994. It found that "PLT can be an effective program for increasing environmental knowledge and effecting positive attitudinal growth in student in grades PreK-8, and particularly in Grades 2-8. In addition, teachers who have completed at least one PLT Teacher Workshop, and who implement the new PLT activities as intended, are more likely to observe knowledge gains and attitudinal change in their students. This appears to be particularly true when students are exposed to a series of new PLT activities over a relatively short period of time." More anecdotally, some teachers and administrators have written about their use of PLT in education journals. They include an article by the principal of Oil City Elementary School in Louisiana and the school's environmental science facilitator who integrated PLT throughout the curriculum and saw test scores rise. An account by a high school teacher in rural Maine, detailed how she used PLT and other programs to get her biology students outdoors for most of a semester and the benefits of doing so.

== Current structure ==
Project Learning Tree operates from a national office from the headquarters of the Sustainable Forestry Initiative in Washington, DC. Program delivery to school districts, nonformal learning programs, preservice teacher-training, and other outlets take place on the state level. Each state has one or more state PLT coordinators. One of the primary tasks of the coordinators is to set up professional development workshops for educators. The states also offer train-the-trainer workshops to develop what are called "PLT facilitators", who conduct workshops for teachers. In 2010, 31,660 educators attended 1,604 workshops across the country.

== Other programs ==
PLT has programs that respond to two current trends in education: service learning service learning and making schools "greener" through environmental education and environmental action.

The GreenWorks! program began in 1993 and provides grants of up to $1,000 for service learning projects conducted by students in schools or youth groups. To date, PLT has helped fund close to 1,000 environmental service-learning projects across the United States. In 2010, PLT awarded 28 grants. The GreenSchools! program combines PLT lessons, service-learning, and leadership opportunities for students to help turn their school into a model green school. They investigate their school's operations in five areas (energy use, waste and recycling, water consumption, school site, and environmental quality) and then make recommendations or take action to reduce their school's ecological footprint. PLT has received funding from the U.S. Forest Service, Learn and Serve America through the Corporation of National and Community Service, or the Staples Foundation for Learning to help pilot the program with seventy schools in 19 states. Over 1,000 schools have registered to participate in the program.
