= National Environmental Education Act =

1990 act of the United States Congress

- Long title: An Act to promote environmental education, and for other purposes.
- Enacted by: the 101st United States Congress

Citations
- Public law: Pub. L. 101–619
- Statutes at Large: 104 Stat. 3325

Legislative history
- Introduced in the Senate as S. 3176 by Quentin Burdick on October 10, 1990; Committee consideration by Environment and Public Works; Passed the Senate on October 26, 1990; Passed the House on October 26, 1990; Signed into law by President George H. W. Bush on November 16, 1990

The National Environmental Education Act of 1990 is an act of the United States Congress to promote environmental education.

In this act, Congress found that "threats to human health and environmental quality are increasingly complex, involving a wide range of conventional and toxic pollutants in the air and water and on the land" and that "there is growing evidence of international environmental problems, such as global warming, ocean pollution, and declines in species diversity, and that these problems pose serious threats to human health and the environment on a global scale" and declared several other problems that need to be fixed or addressed by improving environmental education.

The U.S. Environmental Protection Agency (EPA) is the lead agency for implementation of the act. EPA established its Office of Environmental Education to implement this program. The office awards grants to elementary and secondary schools, fellowships to post-secondary students, and provides funding for related activities.

Pursuant to the law, EPA also established the National Environmental Education Advisory Council to receive advice from non-federal organizations on developing educational programs. The council conducts public meetings and publishes reports on its recommendations. It also established the National Environmental Education Foundation to advance environmental education, support environmental protection efforts, coordinate public and private resources, and foster partnerships among government, industry, academia, and community organizations.
