= Environmental education =

Branch of pedagogy

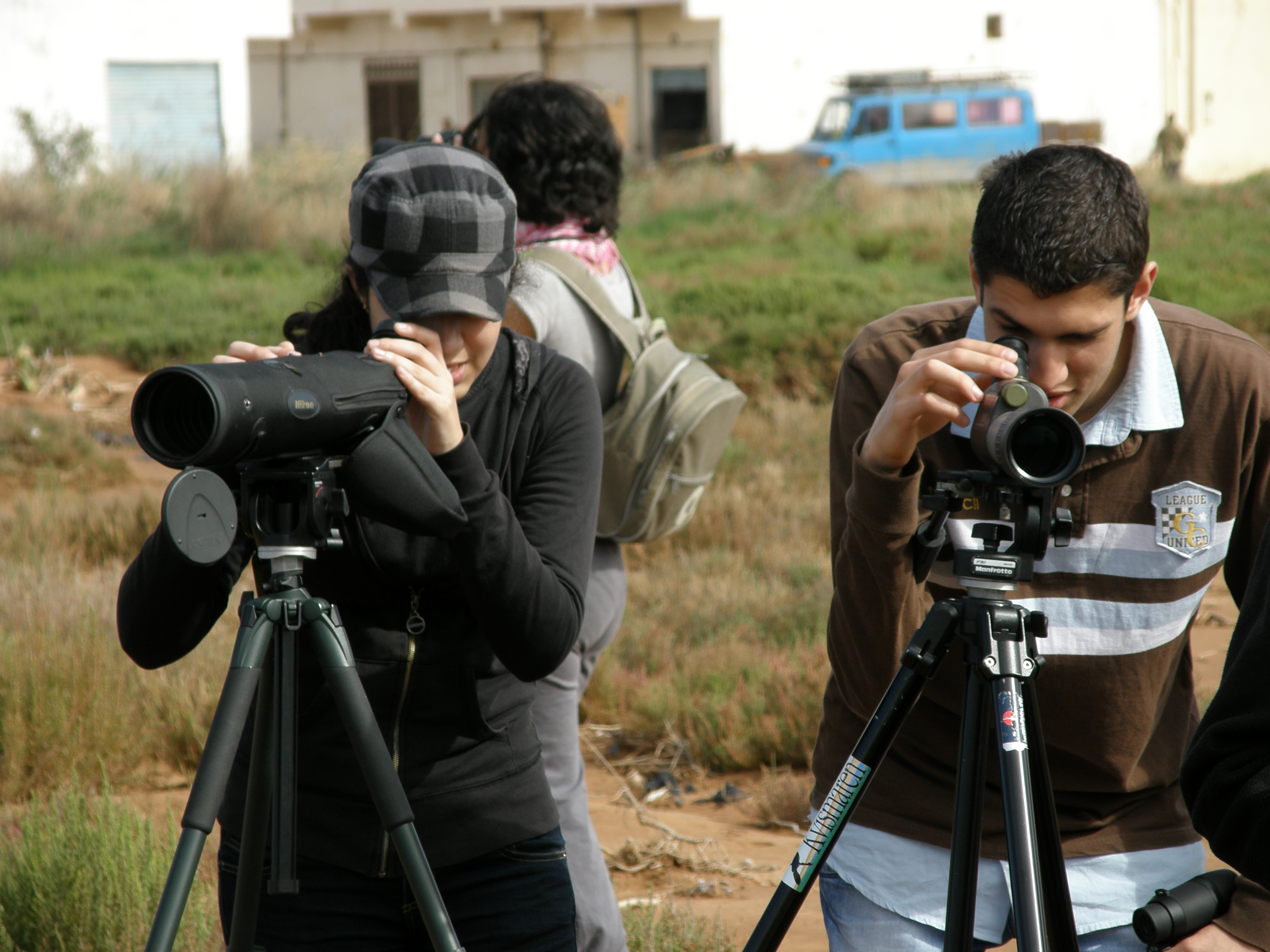
Moroccan students watching birds at Nador lagoon during the activities organized by SEO/BirdLife during the World Wetlands Day in Morocco

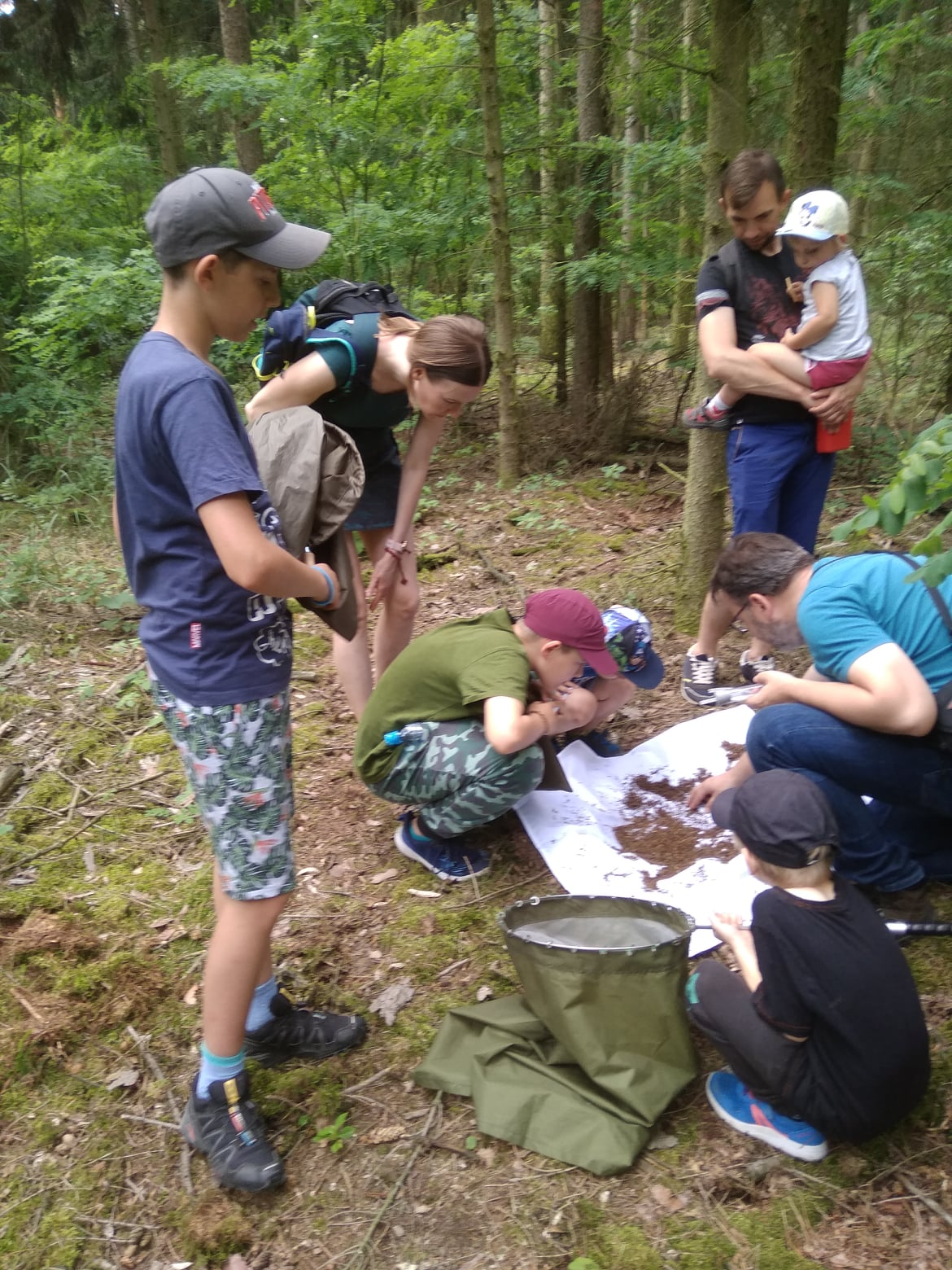
Nature walk with an entomologist, Prof. Paweł Sienkiewicz, who on its basis wrote an educational brochure (about the importance of dead wood, insects, and biodiversity) for the Way of Peace ― one of Rogalin Ways, inspired by Laudato Si'

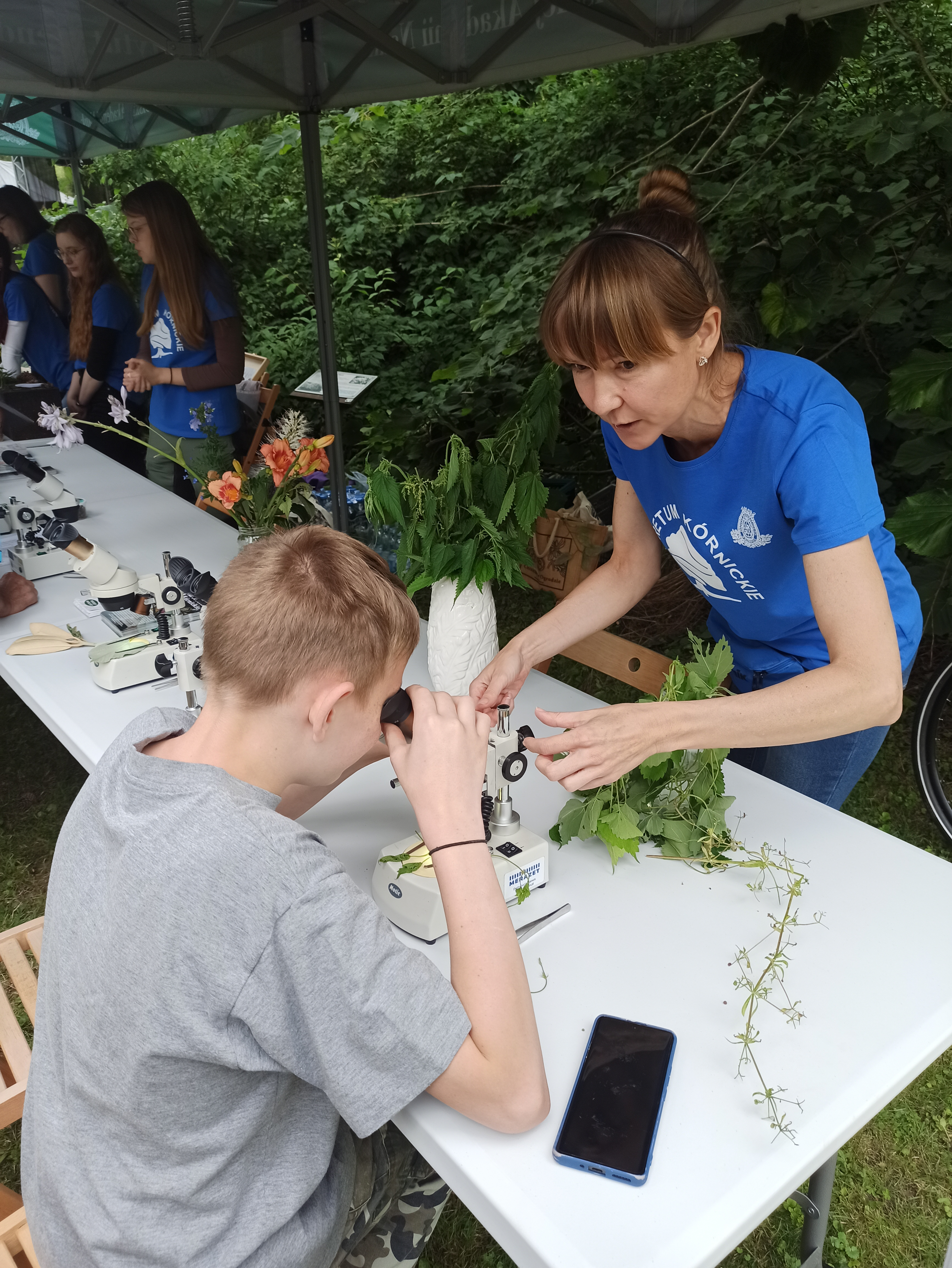
Environmental education during celebrations of 200 years of Kórnik Arboretum on 19 July 2026

Environmental education (EE) refers to organized efforts to teach how natural environments function, and particularly, how human beings can manage behavior and ecosystems to live sustainably. It is a multi-disciplinary field integrating disciplines such as biology, chemistry, physics, ecology, earth science, atmospheric science, mathematics, and geography.

The United Nations Educational, Scientific and Cultural Organization (UNESCO) states that EE is vital in imparting an inherent respect for nature among society and in enhancing public environmental awareness. UNESCO emphasises the role of EE in safeguarding future global developments of societal quality of life (QOL), through the protection of the environment, eradication of poverty, minimization of inequalities and insurance of sustainable development.

The term often implies education within the school system, from primary to post-secondary. However, it sometimes includes all efforts to educate the public and other audiences, including print materials, websites, media campaigns, etc. There are also ways that environmental education is taught outside the traditional classroom: aquariums, zoos, parks, and nature centers all have ways of teaching the public about the environment.

== UNESCO and environmental awareness and education ==
UNESCO's involvement in environmental awareness and education goes back to the very beginnings of the Organization, with the creation in 1948 of the IUCN (International Union for the Conservation of Nature, now the World Conservation Union), the first major non-governmental organization (NGO) mandated to help preserve the natural environment. UNESCO was also closely involved in convening the United Nations Conference on the Human Environment in Stockholm, Sweden in 1972, which led to the setting up of the United Nations Environment Programme (UNEP). Subsequently, for two decades, UNESCO and UNEP led the International Environmental Education Programme (1975-1995), which set out a vision for, and gave practical guidance on how to mobilize education for environmental awareness.

In 1976, UNESCO launched an environmental education newsletter 'Connect' as the official organ of the UNESCO-UNEP International Environmental Education Programme (IEEP). It served as a clearinghouse to exchange information on Environmental Education (EE) in general and to promote the aims and activities of the IEEP in particular, as well as being a network for institutions and individuals interested and active in environment education until 2007.

The long-standing cooperation between UNESCO and UNEP on environmental education (and later ESD (Note: Education for Sustainable Development)) also led to the co-organization of four major international conferences on environmental education since 1977: the First Intergovernmental Conference on Environmental Education in Tbilisi, Georgia (October 1977); the Conference "International Strategy for Action in the Field of Environmental Education and Training for the 1990s" in Moscow, Russian Federation (August 1987); the third International Conference "Environment and Society: Education and Public Awareness for Sustainability" at Thessaloniki, Greece (December 1997); and the Fourth International Conference on Environmental Education towards a Sustainable Future in Ahmedabad, India (November 2007). These meetings highlighted the pivotal role education plays in sustainable development.

It was at the Tbilisi conference in 1977 that the essential role of 'education in environmental matters' (as stated in the recommendations of the 1972 Stockholm Conference) was fully explored. Organized by UNESCO in cooperation with UNEP, this was the world's first intergovernmental conference on environmental education. In the subsequent Tbilisi Declaration, environment was interpreted in its 'totality—natural and built, technological and social (economic, political, cultural-historical, ethical, aesthetic)' (point 3). The goals formulated for environmental education went far beyond ecology in the curriculum and included development of a 'clear awareness of, and concern about, economic, social, political, and ecological interdependence in urban and rural areas' (point 2) which became one of the major bases of ESD.

== Focus ==
Environmental education has multiple approaches that are based primarily on the benefits it brings to our society. One of the most important things to keep in mind when thinking about environmental education is communication. For there to be effective education, environmental information must be transmitted equally to citizens of all demographic groups. Critical, ethical and creative thinking must be developed in individuals when evaluating environmental issues. The development of skills and commitment to act independently and collaboratively in conjunction with society to address an environmental problem. Environmental education also has a broader approach which is that individuals are able to appreciate our surroundings and all the natural resources we have in order to develop positive environmental behavior that leads to change.

== Attributes ==
There are a few central qualities involved in environmental education that are useful contributions for each individual. Through environmental education, real-world problem solving is enhanced, physical activity and dietary quality are strengthened, and communication and leadership are improved when working in groups.

== Careers ==
There are various different career paths one could delve into within environmental education. Many of these careers require discovering and planning how to resolve environmental issues occurring in today's world. The specific responsibilities associated with each career will depend in part on their physical location, taking into account what environmental issue is most prevalent in the area. A general outlook of some careers in this field are:

- Federal Government Park Ranger – Responsible for protecting the national parks, historical sites, and national seashores across the United States including the wildlife and ecosystems within them. There are many qualifications in order for one to become a park ranger and some include: obtaining a bachelor's degree and a passing grade in the PEB. Some focuses within this field include: enforcing park rules, giving tours to groups for educational purposes, and protecting parks from forest fires.
- Outdoor Education Teacher – Teach students by using outdoor field and classroom work. Some invite guest speakers who are experts in their field to help teach how the basic principles of science are implemented in the real world. Some requirements for this career include becoming CPR certified and having a bachelor's degree in either environmental science or a field related to it. It can be a problematic field as there is no concurrence on the central concepts that are taught as well as teachers do not agree on what constitutes an important environmental issue.
- Environmental Scientist – Use of field work to research contamination in nature when writing plans in creating projects for environmental research. Environmental Scientists research topics such as air pollution, water quality, and wildlife. They also study how human health is affected by changes in the environment. Some requirements for this career are a bachelor's degree with a double major in environmental science and either biology, physics or chemistry.
- Environmental Engineer – Involves the combination of biology/chemistry with engineering to generate ways to ensure the health of the planet. Scientific research is analyzed and projects are designed as a result of that research in order to come up with solutions to issues of the environment like air pollution. A bachelor's degree in civil engineering or general engineering is required as well as some experience in this field.

== Related fields ==
Environmental education has crossover with multiple other disciplines. These fields of education complement environmental education yet have unique philosophies.

- Citizen Science (CS) aims to address both scientific and environmental outcomes through enlisting the public in the collection of data, through relatively simple protocols, generally from local habitats over long periods of time.
- Education for Sustainable Development (ESD) aims to reorient education to empower individuals to make informed decisions for environmental integrity, social justice, and economic viability for both present and future generations, whilst respecting cultural diversities.
- Climate Change Education (CCE) aims in enhancing the public's understanding of climate change, its consequences, and its problems, and to prepare current and future generations to limit the magnitude of climate change and to respond to its challenges. Specifically, CCE needs to help learners develop knowledge, skills and values and action to engage and learn about the causes, impact and management of climate change.
- Science Education (SE) focuses primarily on teaching knowledge and skills, to develop innovative thought in society.
- Outdoor Education (OE) relies on the assumption that learning experiences outdoors in 'nature' foster an appreciation of nature, resulting in pro-environmental awareness and action. Outdoor education means learning "in" and "for" the outdoors.
- Experiential education (ExE) is a process through which a learner constructs knowledge, skill, and value from direct experiences" Experiential education can be viewed as both a process and method to deliver the ideas and skills associated with environmental education.
- Garden-based learning (GBL) is an instructional strategy that utilizes the garden as a teaching tool. It encompasses programs, activities and projects in which the garden is the foundation for integrated learning, in and across disciplines, through active, engaging, real-world experiences that have personal meaning for children, youth, adults and communities in an informal outside learning setting.
- Inquiry-based Science (IBS) is an active open style of teaching in which students follow scientific steps in a similar manner as scientists to study some problem. Often used in biological and environmental settings.

While each of these educational fields has their own objectives, there are points where they overlap with the intentions and philosophy of environmental education.

== History ==
The roots of environmental education can be traced back as early as the 18th century when Jean-Jacques Rousseau stressed the importance of an education that focuses on the environment in Emile: or, On Education. Several decades later, Louis Agassiz, a Swiss-born naturalist, echoed Rousseau's philosophy as he encouraged students to "Study nature, not books." These two influential scholars helped lay the foundation for a concrete environmental education program, known as nature study, which took place in the late 19th and early 20th century.

The nature study movement used fables and moral lessons to help students develop an appreciation of nature and embrace the natural world. Anna Botsford Comstock, the head of the Department of Nature Study at Cornell University, was a prominent figure in the nature study movement. She wrote the Handbook for Nature Study in 1911 which used nature to educate children on cultural values. Comstock and the other leaders of the movement, such as Liberty Hyde Bailey, helped Nature Study garner tremendous amounts of support from community leaders, teachers, and scientists to change the science curriculum for children across the United States.

A new type of environmental education, Conservation Education, emerged in the US as a result of the Great Depression and Dust Bowl during the 1920s and 1930s. Conservation Education dealt with the natural world in a drastically different way from Nature Study because it focused on rigorous scientific training rather than natural history. Conservation Education was a major scientific management and planning tool that helped solve social, economic, and environmental problems during this time period.

The modern environmental education movement, which gained significant momentum in the late 1960s and early 1970s, stems from Nature Study and Conservation Education. During this time period, many events—such as the Cold War, the Civil rights movement and the Vietnam War—placed many Americans at odds with one another and the U.S. government. However, as more people began to fear the fallout from radiation, the chemical pesticides mentioned in Rachel Carson's Silent Spring, and the significant amounts of air pollution and waste, the public's concern for their health and the health of their natural environment led to a unifying phenomenon known as environmentalism. Environmental education was born of the realization that solving complex local and global problems cannot be accomplished by politicians and experts alone, but requires "the support and active participation of an informed public in their various roles as consumers, voters, employers, and business and community leaders." In 1960 the National Rural Studies Association (now known as the National Association for Environmental Education) was established in the UK to promote environmental education and support teachers in incorporating sustainability into their curricula.

One of the first articles about environmental education as a new movement appeared in the Phi Delta Kappan in 1969, authored by James A. Swan. A definition of "Environmental Education" first appeared in The Journal of Environmental Education in 1969, written by William B. Stapp. Stapp later went on to become the first Director of Environmental Education for UNESCO, and then the Global Rivers International Network.

Ultimately, the first Earth Day on April 22, 1970 – a national teach-in about environmental problems – paved the way for the modern environmental education movement. Later that same year, President Nixon passed the National Environmental Education Act, which was intended to incorporate environmental education into K-12 schools. Then, in 1971, the National Association for Environmental Education (now known as the North American Association for Environmental Education) was created to improve environmental literacy by providing resources to teachers and promoting environmental education programs.

Internationally, environmental education gained recognition when the UN Conference on the Human Environment held in Stockholm, Sweden, in 1972, declared environmental education must be used as a tool to address global environmental problems. The United Nations Education Scientific and Cultural Organization (UNESCO) and United Nations Environment Program (UNEP) created three major declarations that have guided the course of environmental education.

In 2002, the United Nations Decade of Education for Sustainable Development 2005-2014 (UNDESD) was formed as a way to reconsider, excite, and change approaches to acting positively on global challenges. The Commission on Education and Communication (CEC) helped support the work of the UNDESD by composing a backbone structure for education for sustainability, which contained five major components. The components are "Imagining a better future", "Critical thinking and reflection", "Participation in decision making" and "Partnerships, and Systemic thinking".

On June 9–14, 2013, the seventh World Environmental Education Congress was held in Marrakesh, Morocco. The overall theme of the conference was "Environmental education and issues in cities and rural areas: seeking greater harmony", and incorporated 11 different areas of concern. The World Environmental Education Congress had 2,400 members, representing over 150 countries. This meeting was the first time ever that it had been held in an Arab country, and was put together by two different organizations, the Mohamed VI Foundation for Environmental Protection and the World Environmental Education Congress Permanent Secretariat in Italy. Topics addressed at the congress include stressing the importance of environmental education and its role to empower, establishing partnerships to promote environmental education, how to mainstream environmental and sustainability, and even how to make universities "greener".

=== Stockholm Declaration ===
June 5–16, 1972 – The Declaration of the United Nations Conference on the Human Environment. The document was made up of 7 proclamations and 26 principles "to inspire and guide the peoples of the world in the preservation and enhancement of the human environment."

=== Belgrade Charter ===
October 13–22, 1975 – The Belgrade Charter was the outcome of the International Workshop on Environmental Education held in Belgrade, then in Yugoslavia, now in Serbia. The Belgrade Charter was built upon the Stockholm Declaration and added goals, objectives, and guiding principles of environmental education programs. It defined an audience for environmental education, which included the general public.

=== Tbilisi Declaration ===
October 14–26, 1977 – The Tbilisi Declaration "noted the unanimous accord in the important role of environmental education in the preservation and improvement of the world's environment, as well as in the sound and balanced development of the world's communities." The Tbilisi Declaration updated and clarified The Stockholm Declaration and The Belgrade Charter by including new goals, objectives, characteristics, and guiding principles of environmental education.

Later that decade, in 1977, the Intergovernmental Conference on Environmental Education in Tbilisi, Georgian SSR, Soviet Union emphasized the role of Environmental Education in preserving and improving the global environment and sought to provide the framework and guidelines for environmental education. The Conference laid out the role, objectives, and characteristics of environmental education, and provided several goals and principles for environmental education.

Pope Francis in his 2015 encyclical letter Laudato si', referred to a broadening of the goals of environmental education:

Whereas in the beginning it was mainly centred on scientific information, consciousness-raising and the prevention of environmental risks, it tends now to include a critique of the "myths" of a modernity grounded in a utilitarian mindset (individualism, unlimited progress, competition, consumerism, the unregulated market). It seeks also to restore the various levels of ecological equilibrium, establishing harmony within ourselves, with others, with nature and other living creatures, and with God.

== Environmental education in the teaching curriculum ==
Environmental education has been considered an additional or elective subject in much of traditional K-12 curriculum. At the elementary school level, environmental education can take the form of science enrichment curriculum, natural history field trips, community service projects, and participation in outdoor science schools. EE policies assist schools and organizations in developing and improving environmental education programs that provide citizens with an in-depth understanding of the environment. School related EE policies focus on three main components: curricula, green facilities, and training.

Schools can integrate environmental education into their curricula with sufficient funding from EE policies. This approach – known as using the "environment as an integrating context" for learning – uses the local environment as a framework for teaching state and district education standards. In addition to funding environmental curricula in the classroom, environmental education policies allot the financial resources for hands-on, outdoor learning. These activities and lessons help address and mitigate "nature deficit disorder", as well as encourage healthier lifestyles.

Green schools, or green facility promotion, are another main component of environmental education policies. Greening school facilities cost, on average, a little less than 2 percent more than creating a traditional school, but payback from these energy efficient buildings occur within only a few years. Environmental education policies help reduce the relatively small burden of the initial start-up costs for green schools. Green school policies also provide grants for modernization, renovation, or repair of older school facilities. Additionally, healthy food options are also a central aspect of green schools. These policies specifically focus on bringing freshly prepared food, made from high-quality, locally grown ingredients into schools.

In secondary school, environmental education tends to be offered either as a dedicated subject within the sciences or as part of student-led interest groups and clubs. Research shows that secondary students are genuinely concerned about sustainability and climate change, and respond best when given opportunities for collaborative, hands-on inquiry rather than passive instruction. Strategies such as whole-school sustainability projects, student councils and place-based learning have proven particularly effective at this level, helping students develop environmental knowledge, civic engagement and critical thinking skills.

At the undergraduate and graduate level, it can be considered its own field within education, environmental studies, environmental science and policy, ecology, or human/cultural ecology programs. Higher education institutions (HEIs) increasingly move beyond traditional lectures by adopting problem and project-based learning, where students work directly with cities, businesses and campus communities to develop real sustainability solutions. This approach helps students bridge the gap between knowing environmental facts and acting on them, building the professional skills needed to address complex global challenges. Beyond academic programs, universities are also trying to change the way students feel about environmental issues, developing personal values and motivations that lead to genuine behavioral change.

Environmental education is not restricted to in-class lesson plans. Children can learn about the environment in many ways. Experiential lessons in the school yard, field trips to national parks, after-school green clubs, and school-wide sustainability projects help make the environment an easily accessible topic. Furthermore, celebration of Earth Day or participation in EE week (run through the National Environmental Education Foundation) can help further environmental education. Effective programs promote a holistic approach and lead by example, using sustainable practices in the school to encourage students and parents to bring environmental education into their home.

The final aspect of environmental education policies involves training individuals to thrive in a sustainable society. In addition to building a strong relationship with nature, citizens must have the skills and knowledge to succeed in a 21st-century workforce. Thus, environmental education policies fund both teacher training and worker training initiatives. Teachers train to effectively teach and incorporate environmental studies. Conversely, the current workforce must be trained or re-trained so they can adapt to the new green economy. Environmental education policies that fund training programs are critical to educating citizens to prosper in a sustainable society.

== Environmental activities for students ==
When students are able to work on environmental projects it is easier for them to connect what they are learning in the classroom to the real world. This transforms theoretical knowledge into a more ecological perspective of life. Here are a couple of experiential activities that can improve the students' attitudes and behaviors:

- School/home gardening: Students plant different types of seeds they like or are interested in. In this process, they learn plant life cycles, soil health, nutrition and ecosystem basics. Previous programs like this have shown to promote positive attitudes towards nature.
- Composting and waste audits: Students set up a basic composting bin (usually made of wood) for organic scraps or conduct a research of the waste of the trash they see on their campus or home. In comparison to recycling, this activity includes sorting and measuring waste, directing the students to know about decomposition, nutrient cycling and waste reduction.
- Citizen science projects: Students monitor or collect real data from their localities, for instance, testing local stream water quality, counting birds or insects or submitting observations to platforms like iNaturalist. The involvement in these types of experiences forces students to be in contact with their environment and the problems it has, leading to them taking action.
- Nature journaling: Students regularly visit a nearby natural spot, whether in their school, home or city, and write a list of observations of plants, wildlife, weather and seasonal changes. This attention to detail their surroundings has shown to increase their environmental awareness and understanding of ecosystems.
- Habitat-creation: Students build a simple space for animals, like a "bug hotel", bird house or even plant native flowers around the area to provide an habitat that benefits the environment. These projects that are about design-and-build teach biodiversity, food-web thinking and how important the human made habitats are for supporting urban wildlife.
- Nature art projects: Students first collect different types of natural and recycled materials to then create art (a painting, sculpture, collage or drawing) that expresses an environmental idea. By working directly with this materials, students strengthen their emotional connection to nature and develop their creativity and critical thinking about environmental issues.

== In the United States ==
Following the 1970s, non-governmental organizations that focused on environmental education continued to form and grow, the number of teachers implementing environmental education in their classrooms increased, and the movement gained stronger political backing. A critical move forward came when the United States Congress passed the National Environmental Education Act of 1990, which placed the Office of Environmental Education in the U.S. Environmental Protection Agency (EPA) and allowed the agency to create environmental education initiatives at the federal level.

EPA defines environmental education as "a process that allows individuals to explore environmental issues, engage in problem solving, and take action to improve the environment. As a result, individuals develop a deeper understanding of environmental issues and have the skills to make informed and responsible decisions." EPA has listed the components of what should be gained from EE:

- Awareness and sensitivity to the environment and environmental challenges
- Knowledge and understanding of the environment and environmental challenges
- Attitudes of concern for the environment and motivation to improve or maintain environmental quality
- Skills to identify and help resolve environmental challenges
- Participation in activities that lead to the resolution of environmental challenges.

Through the EPA Environmental Education (EE) Grant Program, public schools, communities agencies, and NGO's are eligible to receive federal funding for local educational projects that reflect the EPA's priorities: air quality, water quality, chemical safety, and public participation among the communities.

In the United States some of the antecedents of environmental education were the Nature Study movement, conservation education and school camping. Nature studies integrated academic approach with outdoor exploration. Conservation education raised awareness about the misuse of natural resources and the need for their preservation. George Perkins Marsh discoursed on humanity's integral part of the natural world. Governmental agencies such as the U.S. Forest Service and the EPA supported conservation efforts. Conservation ideals still guide environmental education today. School camping was exposure to the environment and use of resources outside of the classroom for educational purposes. The legacies of these antecedents are still present in the evolving arena of environmental education.

== Obstacles ==
A study of Ontario teachers explored obstacles to environmental education. Through an internet-based survey questionnaire, 300 K-12 teachers from Ontario, Canada responded. Based on the results of the survey, the most significant challenges identified by the sample of Ontario teachers include over-crowded curriculum, lack of resources, low priority of environmental education in schools, limited access to the outdoors, student apathy to environmental issues, and the controversial nature of sociopolitical action.

An influential article by Stevenson outlines conflicting goals of environmental education and traditional schooling. According to Stevenson, the recent critical and action orientation of environmental education creates a challenging task for schools. Contemporary environmental education strives to transform values that underlie decision making from ones that aid environmental (and human) degradation to those that support a sustainable planet. This contrasts with the traditional purpose of schools of conserving the existing social order by reproducing the norms and values that currently dominate environmental decision making. Confronting this contradiction is a major challenge to environmental education teachers.

Additionally, the dominant narrative that all environmental educators have an agenda can present difficulties in expanding reach. It is said that an environmental educator is one "who uses information and educational processes to help people analyze the merits of the many and varied points of view usually present on a given environmental issues." Greater efforts must be taken to train educators on the importance of staying within the profession's substantive structure, and in informing the general public on the profession's intention to empower fully informed decision making.

Another obstacle facing the implementation of environmental education lies the quality of education itself. Charles Sayan, the executive director of the Ocean Conservation Society, represents alternate views and critiques on environmental education in his new book The Failure of Environmental Education (And How We Can Fix It). In a Yale Environment 360 interview, Sayan discusses his book and outlines several flaws within environmental education, particularly its failed efforts to "reach its potential in fighting climate change, biodiversity loss, and environmental degradation". He believes that environmental education is not "keeping pace with environmental degradation" and encourages structural reform by increasing student engagement as well as improving relevance of information. These same critiques are discussed in Stewart Hudson's BioScience paper, "Challenges for Environmental Education: Issues and Ideas for the 21st Century". Another study describes obstacles in environmental education also rooted in the capability of the school leaders. They are the epicentre of education. However, implementing ESD in schools is difficult as school leaders faced too many challenges for a single plan to work.

In 2017, a study found that high school science textbooks and government resources on climate change from United States, EU, Canada and Australia did focus their recommendations for CO_{2} emission reductions on lower-impact actions instead of promoting the most effective emission-reduction strategies.

== Movement ==
Since environmental education became a recognized field in industrial societies, the emphasis has moved from teaching nature appreciation to preparing participants to actively engage with sustainability. Many programs follow this progression, starting with building a connection to nature and then directing that connection toward conservation and sustainable behavior.

Programs across the United States, including Life Lab at UC Santa Cruz and various initiatives at Cornell University, use outdoor and hands-on learning as their primary approach. Time spent in nature tends to strengthen the sense of connection people feel toward it and promote environmentally responsible behavior. Some researchers refer to this as "connectedness to nature," a factor that appears consistently in studies examining long term engagement with environmental issues.

Studies in this area suggest that the emotional side of environmental education matters alongside the factual side. Learning about environmental problems alone does not reliably produce behavioral change; however, a sense of connection to the natural world tends to go hand in hand with a greater willingness to act. People who feel connected to the world they live in are more likely to take care of it. Environmental education research has increasingly treated this kind of emotional and cognitive engagement as foundational, not secondary.

== Environmental education in the global South ==
Environmentalism has also begun to make waves in the development of the global South, as the "First World" takes on the responsibility of helping developing countries to combat environmental issues produced and prolonged by conditions of poverty. Unique to environmental education in the Global South is its particular focus on sustainable development. This goal has been a part of international agenda since the 1900s, with the United Nations Educational Scientific and Cultural Organizations (UNESCO) and the Earth Council Alliance (ECA) at the forefront of pursuing sustainable development in the south.

The 1977 Tbilisi intergovernmental conference played a key role in the development of outcome of the conference was the Tbilisi Declaration, a unanimous accord which "constitutes the framework, principles, and guidelines for environmental education at all levels—local, national, regional, and international—and for all age groups both inside and outside the formal school system" recommended as a criterion for implementing environmental education. The Declaration was established with the intention of increasing environmental stewardship, awareness and behavior, which paved the way for the rise of modern environmental education.

After the 1992 Rio Earth Summit, over 80 National Councils for Sustainable Development in developing countries were created between 1992–1998 to aid in compliance of international sustainability goals and encourage "creative solutions".

In 1993, the Earth Council Alliance released the Treaty on environmental education for sustainable societies and global responsibility, sparking discourse on environmental education. The Treaty, in 65 statements, outlines the role of environmental education in facilitating sustainable development through all aspects of democratized participation and provides a methodology for the Treaty's signatories. It has been instrumentally utilized in expanding the field towards the global South, wherein the discourse of "environmental education for sustainable development" recognizes a need to include human population dynamics in EE and emphasizes "aspects related to contemporary economic realities and by placing greater emphasis on concerns for planetary solidarity". Even as a necessary tool for the proliferation of environmental stewardship, environmental education implemented in the South varies and addresses environmental issues in relation to their impact different communities and specific community needs. Whereas in the developed global North where the environmentalist sentiments are centered around conservation without taking into consideration "the needs of people living within communities", the global South must push forth a conservation agenda that parallels with social, economic, and political development. The role of environmental education in the South is centered around potential economic growth in development projects, as explicitly stated by the UNESCO, to apply environmental education for sustainable development through a "creative and effective use of human potential and all forms of capital to ensure rapid and more equitable economic growth, with minimal impact on the environment".

Moving into the 21st century, EE was furthered by United Nations as a part of the 2000 Millennium Development Goals to improve the planet by 2015. The MDGs included global efforts to end extreme poverty, work towards gender equality, access to education, and sustainable development to name a few. Although the MDGs produced great outcomes, its objectives were not met, and MDGs were soon replaced by Sustainable Development Goals. A "universal call to action to end poverty, protect the planet and ensure that all people enjoy peace and prosperity", SDGs became the new face of global priorities. These new goals incorporated objectives from MDGs yet incorporated a necessary environmental framework to "address key systemic barriers to sustainable development such as inequality, unsustainable consumption patterns, weak institutional capacity and environmental degradation that the MDGs neglected".

== Trends ==
One of the current trends within environmental education seeks to move from an approach of ideology and activism to one that allows students to make informed decisions and take action based on experience as well as data. Within this process, environmental curricula have progressively been integrated into governmental education standards. A study found that standardized curriculum can be a significant impediment to environmental education implementation. Some environmental educators find this movement distressing and move away from the original political and activist approach to environmental education while others find this approach more valid and accessible. Regardless, many educational institutions are encouraging students to take an active role in environmental education and stewardship at their institutions. They know that "to be successful, greening initiatives require both grassroots support from the student body and top down support from high-level campus administrators."

Italy announced in 2019 that environmental education (including topics of sustainability and climate change) will be integrated into other subject matter and will be a mandatory part of the curriculum in public schools.

In the United States, Title IV, Part A of the Every Student Succeeds Act states that environmental education is eligible for grant funding. The program gives a "well-rounded" education as well as access to student health and safety programs. Title IV, Part B states that environmental literacy programs are also eligible for funding through the 21st Century Community Learning Centers Program. The funds that are available for both parts are block granted to the states using the Title I formula. In the FY2018 budget, Titles IVA and IVB were both given $1.1 billion and $1.2 billion. For title IVA, this is a $700 million raise from the 2017 budget which makes the 2018–2019 school year the most availability to environmental education ever.

== Renewable energy education ==
Renewable energy education (REE) is a relatively new field of education, that covers the concepts, facts, principles and technologies fused to harness the renewable energy sources. Educators argue that such programs are increasingly needed because non-renewable resources are finite and their continues use is unsustainable. Renewable energy education is also directed at policymakers as a way to promote sustainable development worldwide. Proponents suggest that wider use of renewable energy has potential to uproot millions of people out of poverty and improve quality of life in many countries. Another aim of the field is to bring awareness of climate change, and current renewable energy technologies, since public understanding is considered important for the adoption of the new technologies.

== See also ==
- The Amazonia Conference
- Arts-based environmental education
- Citizen Science
- Climate Change
- Ecological empathy
- Education for Sustainable Development
- Environmental adult education
- Environmental protection
- Environmental psychology
- Environmental science
- Environmental studies
- Expeditionary education
- Fourth International Conference on Environmental Education
- Global education
- Go Green Initiative (GGI)
- Human rights education
- Learnscapes
- List of environmental degrees
- List of environmental education institutions
- Nature centers
- Network of Conservation Educators and Practitioners
- Outdoor education
- Quality of life
- Science Education
- Science, Technology, Society and Environment Education
- UNESCO

== Sources ==
This article incorporates text from a free content work. Licensed under CC BY-SA (license statement/permission). Text taken from Issues and trends in Education for Sustainable Development, 26, 27, UNESCO. UNESCO.

== Notes ==
=== Bibliography ===
- Gruenewald, D.A. (2004). "A Foucauldian analysis of environmental education: toward the socioecological challenge of the Earth Charter". Curriculum Inquiry. 34 (1): 71–107. doi:10.1111/j.1467-873x.2004.00281.x. S2CID 49546112.
- Hoelscher, David W. 2009. "Cultivating the Ecological Conscience: Smith, Orr, and Bowers on Ecological Education." M.A. thesis, University of North Texas. https://digital.library.unt.edu/ark:/67531/metadc12133/m1/
- Kyburz-Graber, R.; Hofer, K.; Wolfensberger, B. (2006). "Studies on a socio-ecological approach to environmental education – a contribution to a critical position in the education for sustainable development discourse" (PDF). Environmental Education Research. 12 (1): 101–114. Bibcode:2006EnvER..12..101K. doi:10.1080/13504620500527840. S2CID 11237897.
- Lieberman, G.A. & L.L. Hoody. 1998. "Closing the Achievement Gap: Using the Environment as an Integrating Context for Learning." State Education and Environment Roundtable, Poway, CA.
- Lieberman, Gerald A. 2013. Education and the Environment: Creating Standards-Based Programs in Schools and Districts. Cambridge, MA: Harvard Education Press.
- Malone, K (1999). "Environmental education researchers as environmental activists". Environmental Education Research. 5 (2): 163–177. Bibcode:1999EnvER...5..163M. doi:10.1080/1350462990050203.
- Palmer, J.A, 1998. Environmental Education in the 21st Century: Theory, Practice, Progress, and Promise. Routledge.
- Roth, Charles E. 1978. "Off the Merry-Go-Round and on to the Escalator". pp. 12–23 in From Ought to Action in Environmental Education, ed. William B. Stapp. Columbus, OH: SMEAC Information Reference Center. Ed 159 046.
- "Overhauling environmental education". Science. 276 (5311): 361. 1997. doi:10.1126/science.276.5311.361d. S2CID 220103870.
- Smyth, J.C. (2006). "Environment and education: a view of a changing scene". Environmental Education Research. 12 (3–4): 247–264. doi:10.1080/13504620600942642. S2CID 143606203.
- Stohr, W (2013). "Coloring a Green Generation: The Law and Policy of Nationally-Mandated Environmental Education and Social Value Formation at the Primary and Secondary Academic Levels". The Journal of Law and Education. 42 (1): 1–110.
- Bamberg, S.; Moeser, G. (2007). "Twenty years after Hines, Hungerford, and Tomera: A new meta-analysis of psycho-social determinants of pro-environmental behaviour". Journal of Environmental Psychology. 27 (1): 14–25. doi:10.1016/j.jenvp.2006.12.002.
- Beatty. A., 2012. Climate Change Education. Washington, DC: The National Academies Press
- Bonney, R.; et al. (2009). "2009. Citizen Science: A Developing Tool for Expanding Science Knowledge and Scientific Literacy". BioScience. 59 (11): 977–984. Bibcode:2009BiSci..59..977B. doi:10.1525/bio.2009.59.11.9. JSTOR 10.1525/bio.2009.59.11.9. S2CID 86258546.

Clarke, D.A.G.; Mcphie (2014). "Becoming animate in education: immanent materiality and outdoor learning for sustainability" (PDF). Journal of Adventure Education and Outdoor Learning. 14 (3): 198–216. doi:10.1080/14729679.2014.919866. S2CID 145339853.

- Education Resources Information Centre (ERIC), 2002. Outdoor, Experiential, and Environmental Education: Converging or Diverging Approaches? [pdf]. ERIC Development Team. Available at: <http://files.eric.ed.gov/fulltext/ED467713.pdf>
- Pooley, J.A.; O'Connor, M. (2000). "Environmental education and attitudes - Emotions and beliefs are what is needed". Environment and Behavior. 32 (5): 711–723. Bibcode:2000EnvBe..32..711P. doi:10.1177/0013916500325007. S2CID 145070949.
- United Nations Educational, Scientific and Cultural Organization., 2014a. Ecological Sciences for Sustainable Development. [online] Available at: <http://www.unesco.org/new/en/natural-sciences/environment/ecological-sciences/capacity-building-and-partnerships/educational-materials/>
- United Nations Educational, Scientific and Cultural Organization., 2014b. Shaping the Future We Want: UN Decade of Education for Sustainable Development. [pdf] Paris: UNESCO. Available at: < http://unesdoc.unesco.org/images/0023/002301/230171e.pdf>
- Wals, A. E.; et al. (2014). "2014. Convergence Between Science and Environmental Education". Science. 344 (6184): 583–4. Bibcode:2014Sci...344..583W. doi:10.1126/science.1250515. PMID 24812386. S2CID 206554904.
