= Green consumption =

Sustainable development or sustainable consumer behaviour

Green consumption is related to sustainable development or sustainable consumer behaviour. It is a form of consumption that safeguards the environment for the present and for future generations. It ascribes to consumers responsibility or co-responsibility for addressing environmental problems through the adoption of environmentally friendly behaviors, such as the use of organic products, clean and renewable energy, and the choice of goods produced by companies with zero, or almost zero, impact (zero waste, zero-emissions vehicle, zero-energy building, etc.).

In Western societies, green consumption emerged during the 1960s and the early 1970s, with the increased awareness of the necessity to protect the environment and people's health from the effects caused by industrial pollutants and by economic and population growth. In the 1980s, the first American green brands began to appear and exploded on the American market. During the 1990s, green products grew slowly, remaining a niche phenomenon. American interest in green products started to increase again in the early 2000s and have continued to grow.

== Origin and development ==
After the oil crisis of 1973, people in western countries began to consider the use of green energy as an alternative to fossil fuels. Now green consumption is considered a basic point of environmental reform and it is also guaranteed by supra-national organizations like the European Union. Some sociologists argue that increasing globalization led people to feel more interconnected with others and the environment, which led to an increasing awareness of global environmental problems, especially in western countries.

The main forums in which the issue has been discussed, and which have provided guidelines to orient national governments are: Stockholm 1972 UN Conference on the Human Environment; IUCN 1980 World Conservation Strategy; World Commission on Environment and Development in 1983 and 1987 Brundtland Report; Italy 1993 National Plan for Sustainable Development; Aalborg 1994, 1st European Conference on Sustainable Cities; Lisbon 1996, 2nd European Conference on Sustainable Cities; Hannover 2000, 3rd Conference on Sustainable Cities; European Union in 2001, VI Environmental Action Plan 2002/2010; Aalborg +10; and the Aalborg Commitments in 2004.

== Pro-environmental behavior ==
Green consumer behavior is a form of pro-environmental behavior, a form of consumption that harms the environment as little as possible or even benefits the environment. Research provides empirical support to the claim that green or pro-environmental consumer behavior is composed of:

- "Private-sphere behavior" — the purchase, use, and disposal of personal and household products that have environmental impact, such as automobiles, public transportation, or recycling
- "Public-sphere behavior" — behavior that affects the environment directly through committed environmental activism or indirectly by influencing public policies, such as active involvement in environmental organizations and demonstrations (direct impact) or petitioning on environmental issues (indirect impact)

Contextual factors like monetary incentives, costs, regulations, and public policy norms, as well as subjectively perceived factors such as perceived resources available influence consumer pro-environmental behavior and thus green consumption through the mediating effect of attitudes. It is through attitude that subjectively perceived contextual factors such as the extent to which consumers perceive having more or less time, money, and power available, modulate pro-environmental behavior in general, and green consumption in particular.

== Green consumer behavior ==
Green consumer behavior has the following characteristics:

- "purchase choice, product use and post-use, household management, collective, and consumer activism behaviors, reflecting some degree of environmental-related motivation";
- "purchase and use of products with lower environmental impacts, such as biodegradable products, recycled or reduced packaging, and low energy usage";
- use of organic products, made with processes that provide energy savings, then by the action of recycling.

A green consumer is "one who purchases products and services perceived to have a positive (or less negative) influence on the environment…" Green consumers act ethically, motivated not only by their personal needs, but also by the respect and preservation of the welfare of entire society, because they take into account the environmental consequences (costs and benefits) of their private consumption. Green consumers are more conscientious in their use of assets, for example by using their goods without wasting resources. However the Eurobarometer's survey of consumers’ behavior (2013) showed that consumers seem not to place importance on adopting a set of new behaviors that are more environmentally-friendly. That report stated that even though a very high proportion of citizens buy green products (80%), more than half are classified as occasional maintenance (54%), and only a quarter are regular buyers of green products (26%). This suggests that most people do not behave like green consumers continuously, probably because of social and economic constraints, such as the fact that green products can be more expensive than non-green ones, or because it is not always easy to find green goods for each category, and green retailers are not so widespread. Some researchers find that personal values are influential determinants of consumption and that pro-environmental behavior might serve as a signal of personality dimension. There are two types of consumers:

1. prevention-type consumers, who feel a moral duty towards a greener lifestyle
2. promotion-type, who are more focused on their aspirations and their dreams and don't strongly feel the pressure to quickly adjust their behavior in the direction of becoming more environmentally-friendly

Another researcher finds an effect of gender and social identity on green consumption: "female declared higher levels of sustainable consumption compared with male participants; however when social identity is salient, male increased their sustainable consumption intentions to the same level as female. In this research are identified two kind of people, that have more:

1. self-transcendent values, like women, that are more willing to engage in sustainable consumption
2. self-enhanced values, like men, that are less interested in green behavior

Sustainable consumption is, for men, a way to reinforce their social image, showing to others that they care about environment, whereas for women sustainable consumption is intrinsically important. The evidence is that green consumers are mainly female, aged between 30 and 44 years old, well educated, in a household with a high annual income.

== Principal areas of developed green consumption ==
=== Green energy ===
Green energy includes natural energetic processes that can be harnessed with little pollution.

=== Green food ===
Demand for less environmentally-damaging food production leads people to buy more organic and local food. Organic food is produced through agriculture that does not use artificial chemical fertilizers and pesticides, and animals reared in more natural conditions, without the routine use of drugs, antibiotics, and dewormers common in intensive livestock farming. Consumers can also choose to buy local food in order to reduce the social and environmental impacts of "food miles" – the distance food travels between being produced and being consumed. This behavior can create a new sense of connection with the land, through a concern for the authenticity and provenience of the food eaten, operating as a social as much as a technological innovation. Taste, health, and safety concerns can be other reasons behind this consumption practices.

=== Green fashion ===
Ethical clothing refers to clothing that takes into consideration the impact of production and trade on the environment and on the people behind the clothes we wear. Eco clothing refers to all clothing that has been manufactured using environmentally friendly processes. It includes organic textiles and sustainable materials such as hemp and non-textiles such as bamboo or recycled plastic bottles. It also includes recycled products (clothes made from recycled clothing including vintage, textile and other materials and can also be termed re-used) and is not necessarily made from organic fibers. Organic clothing means clothes that have been made with a minimum use of chemicals and with minimum damage to the environment and fair-trade is intended to achieve better prices, decent working conditions, local sustainability and fair terms for farmers and workers in the developing world.

Three reasons that motivate the purchase of organic cloths are:

- Environmentally-friendly protection;
- Health impact;
- Ethical concerns.

The textile and clothing industry generates much pollution and consumes many resources. Improper use and disposal of clothing products make the problems much more severe. Consumers who are concerned about these (environmental) issues, are best motivated to change their behaviors via philanthropic or environmental-friendly actions that adapt with their financial and sustainability interests. An intuitive and sustainable strategy is clothing reuse. Textile recycling is a method of reprocessing used clothing, fibrous material, and clothing scraps from the manufacturing process. This can reduce manufacturing pollution and resource consumption. Consumers may pay attention to the origin and the materials of the clothes they buy and whether they are harmful to the environment. Consumers often have a lack of information of green fashion or are unaware of the existence of green fashion alternatives to traditional adult fashion.

== See also ==
- Bright green environmentalism
- Cause marketing
- Cultured meat
- Eco-capitalism
- Environmental vegetarianism
- Ethical consumerism
- Green brands
- Green infrastructure
- Greenwashing
- Informed consumer
- Sustainability brand

== Bibliography ==
- Banbury, Catherine; Stinerock, Robert; Subrahmanyan, Saroja (April 2012). "Sustainable consumption: Introspecting across multiple lived cultures". Journal of Business Research. 65 (4): 497–503. doi:10.1016/j.jbusres.2011.02.028.
- A. Bayley, T. Strange, 2008, Sustainable development. Linking economy, society, environment, OECD INSIGHT
- Miniero, Giulia; Codini, Anna; Bonera, Michelle; Corvi, Elisabetta; Bertoli, Giuseppe (September 2014). "Being green: from attitude to actual consumption: Being green". International Journal of Consumer Studies. 38 (5): 521–528. doi:10.1111/ijcs.12128. S2CID 143158022.
- G. Bologna, Natura in bancarotta: verso le nuove regole dell’economia nell’era dell’Antropocene, http://www.greenreport.it/rubriche/natura-in-bancarotta-verso-nuove-regole-delleconomia-nellera-dellantropocene/#prettyPhoto[videospot]/0/
- Costa Pinto, Diego; Herter, Márcia M.; Rossi, Patricia; Borges, Adilson (September 2014). "Going green for self or for others? Gender and identity salience effects on sustainable consumption: Gender, identities and sustainable consumption". International Journal of Consumer Studies. 38 (5): 540–549. doi:10.1111/ijcs.12114.
- Calef, David; Goble, Robert (1 March 2007). "The allure of technology: How France and California promoted electric and hybrid vehicles to reduce urban air pollution". Policy Sciences. 40 (1): 1–34. doi:10.1007/s11077-006-9022-7. hdl:10.1007/s11077-006-9022-7. S2CID 154438981.
- Connolly, John; Prothero, Andrea (March 2008). "Green Consumption: Life-politics, risk and contradictions". Journal of Consumer Culture. 8 (1): 117–145. doi:10.1177/1469540507086422. S2CID 146265463.
- Valliyammai c; Uma s; Dhivya Bharathi k; Surya p (2014). "Efficient energy consumption in green cloud". 2014 International Conference on Recent Trends in Information Technology. pp. 1–4. doi:10.1109/ICRTIT.2014.6996212. S2CID 16191822.
- A. Greening, Lorna; Greene, David L.; Difiglio, Carmen (June 2000). "Energy efficiency and consumption — the rebound effect — a survey". Energy Policy. 28 (6–7): 389–401. Bibcode:2000EnPol..28..389A. doi:10.1016/S0301-4215(00)00021-5.
- Elliott, Rebecca (June 2013). "The taste for green: The possibilities and dynamics of status differentiation through 'green' consumption". Poetics. 41 (3): 294–322. doi:10.1016/j.poetic.2013.03.003.
- Ertz, Myriam; Karakas, Fahri; Sarigöllü, Emine (October 2016). "Exploring pro-environmental behaviors of consumers: An analysis of contextual factors, attitude, and behaviors" (PDF). Journal of Business Research. 69 (10): 3971–3980. doi:10.1016/j.jbusres.2016.06.010.
- Farbotko, Carol; Head, Lesley (December 2013). "Gifts, sustainable consumption and giving up green anxieties at Christmas". Geoforum. 50: 88–96. doi:10.1016/j.geoforum.2013.08.004.
- Goworek, Helen (8 March 2011). "Social and environmental sustainability in the clothing industry: a case study of a fair trade retailer". Social Responsibility Journal. 7 (1): 74–86. doi:10.1108/17471111111114558.
- Haws, Kelly L.; Winterich, Karen Page; Naylor, Rebecca Walker (July 2014). "Seeing the world through GREEN-tinted glasses: Green consumption values and responses to environmentally friendly products". Journal of Consumer Psychology. 24 (3): 336–354. doi:10.1016/j.jcps.2013.11.002. S2CID 154557555.
- Heiskanen, Eva; Pantzar, Mika (1 December 1997). "Toward Sustainable Consumption: Two New Perspectives". Journal of Consumer Policy. 20 (4): 409–442. doi:10.1023/A:1006862631698. S2CID 153749071.
- Jim, C. Y. (1 December 2013). "Sustainable urban greening strategies for compact cities in developing and developed economies". Urban Ecosystems. 16 (4): 741–761. Bibcode:2013UrbEc..16..741J. doi:10.1007/s11252-012-0268-x. S2CID 16554727.
- Saxena, Ravindra P.; Khandelwal, Pradeep K. (29 June 2012). "Greening of industries for sustainable growth: An exploratory study on durable, non-durable and services industries". International Journal of Social Economics. 39 (8): 551–586. doi:10.1108/03068291211238437.
- "Green: The Latest Fashion in Building for 2008". Buildings.
- A. Magnani, 2014, Moda green più competitiva, nòva, IL SOLE 24ORE
- Micheletti, Michele (2003). Political Virtue and Shopping: Individuals, Consumerism, and Collective Action. Springer. doi:10.1057/9781403973764. ISBN 978-1-4039-7376-4.
- Moisander, Johanna; Pesonen, Sinikka (May 2002). "Narratives of sustainable ways of living: constructing the self and the other as a green consumer". Management Decision. 40 (4): 329–342. doi:10.1108/00251740210426321.
- Spaargaren, G; Mol, A (August 2008). "Greening global consumption: Redefining politics and authority". Global Environmental Change. 18 (3): 350–359. Bibcode:2008GEC....18..350S. doi:10.1016/j.gloenvcha.2008.04.010.
- Olli, Eero; Grendstad, Gunnar; Wollebaek, Dag (March 2001). "Correlates of Environmental Behaviors: Bringing Back Social Context". Environment and Behavior. 33 (2): 181–208. Bibcode:2001EnvBe..33..181O. doi:10.1177/0013916501332002. S2CID 38386910.
- Peattie, Ken (21 November 2010). "Green Consumption: Behavior and Norms". Annual Review of Environment and Resources. 35 (1): 195–228. doi:10.1146/annurev-environ-032609-094328.
- "The Greening of Wal-Mart - Jonathan Rowe". April 2011.
- R. Sassatelli, 2007, Consumer culture. History, theory and politics, SAGE Publications
- Seyfang, Gill (May 2007). "Growing sustainable consumption communities: The case of local organic food networks". International Journal of Sociology and Social Policy. 27 (3/4): 120–134. doi:10.1108/01443330710741066.
- Steg, Linda; Vlek, Charles (September 2009). "Encouraging pro-environmental behaviour: An integrative review and research agenda" (PDF). Journal of Environmental Psychology. 29 (3): 309–317. doi:10.1016/j.jenvp.2008.10.004. hdl:11370/7581b727-854c-41c2-a8af-e055e6224240. S2CID 9264684.
- Thongplew, Natapol; van Koppen, C.S.A. (Kris); Spaargaren, Gert (July 2014). "Companies contributing to the greening of consumption: findings from the dairy and appliance industries in Thailand". Journal of Cleaner Production. 75: 96–105. Bibcode:2014JCPro..75...96T. doi:10.1016/j.jclepro.2014.03.076.
- Barendregt, Bart; Jaffe, Rivke (2014). Green Consumption: The Global Rise of Eco-Chic. Taylor & Francis. doi:10.4324/9781003085508. ISBN 978-0-85785-798-9. S2CID 241764140.
