= Green brands =

Potentially sustainable brands

Green brands are brands that consumers associate with environmental conservation and sustainable business practices.

Such brands appeal to consumers who are becoming more aware of the need to protect the environment. A green brand can add a unique selling point to a product and can boost corporate image. However, if a company is found or perceived to overstate its green practices its green brand may be criticised as greenwash.

== Increase in green brands ==
Ethical consumerism has led to an increase in green brands. In the food and drink industry 5 green brand products were available in 2002, leading to 328 in 2007 (Mintel global database).

== Packaging ==
In the case of consumer brands, packaging can be a key element in communicating a green brand. This is because packaging communicates information to the consumer at the point-of-sale, and because of the environmental impact of the packaging itself.

Companies may claim sustainable packaging, recycled and/or recyclable material, or reduce excess packaging. Packaging is of especially high importance of the product and brand. Packaging material may have environmental credentials.

== Advertisement and marketing standards concerns ==
In Europe concerns have been raised about inauthenticity as a result of a recent increase in green brands. Because green brands can add a unique selling point there is little consistency from brand to brand. In the food and drinks industry it has been observed that companies prefer their own logo because it makes the brand more easily seen for the consumer.

In Britain, the Advertising Standards Authority (ASA) warned consumers in mid-2007 about inauthenticity. The ASA discovered "unsubstantiated environmental claims". The ASA director general has stated that "the ASA needs to see robust evidence to back up any eco-friendly claims".

The ASA in Britain has also raised concerns that as awareness about climate change increase among consumers, the cases of unsubstantiated carbon claims (e.g. carbon emissions and carbon neutral claims) rises. The ASA has upheld a number of complaints against energy companies, including Scottish and Southern Energy car manufacturers, including Toyota, Lexus and Volkswagen, and airlines, including EasyJet, for misleading claims regarding carbon emissions and carbon neutrality.

Recent cases before the British ASA involved environmental claims such as "local". In December 2006 for example the ASA heard a complaint against Tesco, where the company advertised British products as "local".

In August 2008 the ASA stated in a case against Shell that "We considered that the Department for Environment, Food and Rural Affairs (Defra) best practice guidance on environmental claims stated that green claims should not 'be vague or ambiguous, for instance by simply trying to give a good impression about general concern for the environment. Claims should always avoid the vague use of terms such as 'sustainable', 'green', 'non-polluting' and so on." They added that "Defra had made that recommendation because, although 'sustainable' was a widely used term, the lack of a universally agreed definition meant that it was likely to be ambiguous and unclear to consumers. Because we had not seen data that showed how Shell was effectively managing carbon emissions from its oil sands projects in order to limit climate change, we concluded that the ad was misleading"

In the United States the Federal Trade Commission issues the "Green Guides" (last updated 2012) - environmental marketing guidelines. The guidelines give advice on the types of substantiation needed to support environmental claims, and give examples of claims that are to be avoided. The Federal Trade Commission has recognised that these guidelines need updating, as for example they currently contain no guidance on carbon neutrality, or the terms sustainable or renewable. The Green Guides do contain guidance on the term recyclable, recycled and biodegradable.

The marketing and brand building experiences of many American green brands was documented in the book The Gort Cloud by Richard Seireeni, 2009. The gort cloud refers to the green community that provides support and a market to green brands.

== Consumer demand ==
In recent decades, there has been increasing interest in protecting the environment and sustainability when it comes to the world's markets. Due to global warming and the immense amount of environmental pollution attributed to factory manufacturing, the world has observed the rise in environmental issues. In response to society’s concerns, this has seen an increasing number of companies adopting green brands to front environmental responsibility. In turn, products and services of green brands have recently been seen to have a perfectly inelastic demand because people are prepared to support and pay a higher price for a sustainable image.

Through a consumer study taken in 1999, it was discovered that environmental issues are ranked above human rights, animal rights and welfare issues. This information shows growing consumer demand of companies providing goods and services that preserve the environment and adopt a “green” approach to business. In a similar study, according to Iannuzzi (2011), a compelling global demand for “greener products” was demonstrated by over 60% of all countries studied, further demonstrating the desire of environmentally friendly green brands. In the study, environmental awareness was placed among the most vital product traits that consumers valued when purchasing, along with minimising toxic and hazardous substances, water preservation and recycling. Green brands are ultimately more attractive to a lot of consumers nowadays, and committing to such sustainability is now essential to stay competitive.

Because concern for the environment is now a pivotal element in consumer decision-making, studies have found that the demand for green brands is higher than ever before. A number of studies have also suggested that such a demand for greener products is due to consumers’ self-expressive benefits. When supporting green brands, customers believe this determines their role in society and this gives consumers satisfaction that they are perceived as having an eco-friendly attitude. Various components have been stipulated as effects on conscious consumer behavior such as changing perspectives, awareness of environmental issues and greener products, and people’s perceived environmental contribution in society. Such factors help green brands to segment, define and target their market.

An example of companies tackling environmental sustainability is the world’s largest retailer, Walmart. Walmart has undertaken a sustainability strategy that called on their suppliers to supply greener products because they were adamant their customers demanded “more efficient, longer lasting and better performing products”. This green approach to business has put pressure on other companies to adopt similar practices.

The shift towards green brands is a result of numerous factors such as organic products being more accessible, fuel-efficient and eco-friendly automobiles becoming increasingly prevalent, and countless consumers looking to support the environment and portraying a green image. The development of the greener approach to living has transferred into marketing and advertising and consumer markets, where enterprises are adopting this movement to attract customers and increase profits.

== Marketing of green brands ==
When it comes to marketing strategies of green brands, company officials want to understand the effects of being green has on their company and customers alike. Being a green brand alone differentiates a brand from the outset and opens new market opportunities. The Body Shop is an example of a competitive green brand that succeeds through understanding and providing the consumer demand for eco-friendly products and their sound environmental performance. Green brands have also been profitable in niche markets where they can charge exclusive prices because conscious consumers are prepared to pay.

To combine environmental concern into marketing strategy is called ‘green marketing’ where companies use a range of undertakings to satisfy the consumer demand for environmentally friendly products such as revamping advertising, product adjustment, altering production operations, sustainable packaging and recycling. By doing this, a green brand is creating further value, which is conveyed through their communication strategy.

Green brands looking to secure their sustainable image within consumers minds must establish a philosophy that describes their use of renewable resources, minimising waste, supplying safe goods and services and "giving back to the environment". Environmental concerns should also be included in marketing plans. After segmenting the market, green brands can make contact with their target market through integrated marketing communications (IMC), which conveys their value proposition to consumers.

Where a clean and green image is communicated, brands should be associated with environmental claims that are truthful in how their business practices impact on the surrounding environment. Such claims can be relayed through green labeling colour schemes, packaging, and “nature” images through advertisements as well as on the Internet. Consumers need to be wary of greenwashing through marketing strategies that does not reflect any green qualities in the product itself.

Another area of marketing a green brand is making use of functional and emotional strategies to position a brand in consumers’ minds. The functional characteristic approach delivers information on how a brand's products and services are environmentally friendly, which creates brand connections for buyers and powerful perception of the company. Such information should include a company’s sustainable production process and ecological footprint in relation to its superiority to other competitors. The emotional approach for positioning focuses on emotions and alludes to a brand relationship with nature and the environment. It has been found that emotional strategies build brand loyalty very effectively because consumers feel they are helping preserve the environment through supporting sustainably made products. Wang (2016) states that overall, a mixed strategy of using both emotional and functional approaches to market a green brand generates favorable brand relationships and commitment from consumers. Most prosperous green brands are affiliated with either “alternative technology or a green corporate philosophy”.

== See also ==
- Bright green environmentalism
- Eco-capitalism
- Ethical consumerism
- Greenwashing
- Informed consumer
- Triple bottom line
- Sustainability brand
