= Sustainable market orientation =

Traditionally, market orientation (MO) focuses on microenvironment and the functional management of an organisation. However, contemporary organisations have widened their focus to incorporate more roles, functions and emphasis on the macro environment. Firms have been concerned with short run success and often not taken into account the long-run ecological, social and economic effects from their activities. Despite growth in the MO concept, there is still a need to reconceptualise the concept with a greater emphasis on external factors that influence a firm.

Sustainable market orientation (SMO) combines the principles of MO with a macro marketing systems management approach, a stakeholder approach to integrated corporate social responsibility and marketing strategy, and the use of the sustainability management concept. SMO will serve to move corporate management beyond the micro economic and functional management prescribed by MO and provide a more comprehensive, stakeholder based approach. Mitchell et al. believe an avenue for the reformulation of MO to create SMO lies in the synthesis of MO, macromarketing, corporate social responsibility (CSR), and sustainable development management concepts.

== Background ==
Unsustainable practices using traditional ideas have a number of consequences with detrimental effects to the external environment. Creative destruction implies destruction is essential for sustained economic growth. Whilst this may be economically beneficial, in many instances it can have overarching negative impacts on the social and ecological environment. Marshall Berman's take on creative destruction identifies that everything is built to be later torn down. This capitalistic approach relates to the idea tragedy of the commons. When firms and individuals only think about their own self-interest as opposed to society as a whole, it will result in over exploitation of finite resources with long term consequences.

=== Rise of sustainable marketing concepts ===
The issues raised in these traditional self-motivated approaches pave the way for a new wave of concepts and theory.

Ecological economics promotes preserving natural capital with emphasis on sustainability and sustainable development. The potential negative impacts of creative destruction and tragedy of the commons are central to what ecological economics addresses, specifically the earth's carrying capacity. Self invested firms without sustainable practices no longer have a place in the modern corporate world.

In terms of marketing, this shift has led to the development of concepts trying to promote and incorporate these ideas see: green marketing, triple bottom line, sustainability marketing, sustainability brand, and CSR. This shift towards adopting sustainable practices is both consumer and company driven. Governments are also looking for more long run approaches towards the achievement of sustainability. The Brundtland Commission or Our Common Future which was published in 1987 from the United Nations World Commission on Environment and Development. It is crucially important to the conceptualisation of SMO and is commonly seen as defining sustainable development. It has been the catalyst for the emergence of work on sustainability. It signaled the surfacing of issues regarding sustaining the environment as critical to international governance.

== Definition ==
SMO differentiates from other sustainable business strategies by focusing on the institutional marketing management aspects of the firm and taking a more stakeholder based approach to corporate management. Through the use of sustainable management principles the firm is able to:

- Achieve objectives such as market competitiveness and profitability through the application of economically, socially, and environmentally responsible value systems;
- Use marketing strategies that anticipate and meet customer needs through the effective integration of comprehensive environmental intelligence with operational and marketing systems;
- Generate positive, long-run outcomes in economic, social, and environmental terms that are acceptable for primary stakeholders who derive direct financial benefits from the firms and secondary stakeholders who gain indirect economic, social, and environmental benefits.

=== Theoretical foundations ===
Theoretical foundations for SMO have come from three prior sustainable marketing models.

"Socio-ecological market orientation" is the first theory that has led to the conceptualisation of SMO. Social and ecological problems that arise from a free market approach could be mitigated by developing a framework of social, political, economic and ecological norms agreed upon corporations and society that govern the marketing based economy. However, it has a focus on corporate environmental marketing management, as opposed to sustainability and this concept relies on government regulation to ensure compliance.

A second, academically popular, approach relates to green corporate marketing strategies and lifecycle ecological management of product and service management. However, this approach, whilst recognising the importance of incorporating environmentally responsible management fails to incorporate social, economic and environmental management aspects that are paramount to sustainable development.

A third approach to sustainable marketing is using a macro marketing approach to sustainable corporate marketing. This criticises the traditional micro and short term economic strategies and its lack of consideration for externalities and costs associated with environmental deterioration. What is fundamental to this approach is that despite company restraints, sustainable marketing practices can improve efficiency within corporations and looks to trade off between commercial and environmental concerns.

== Framework ==
=== Synthesis of market orientation and sustainability ===
Market orientation has several definitions; Narver and Slater discuss MO in terms of culture and the fundamental characteristics of the organisation. Kohli and Jaworski, 1990 refer to MO as the organisation wide information generation and distribution and the appropriate responses to this information considering current and future customer needs. Key components of MO include market intelligence gathering and synthesis of market information to develop and implement competitive profitable marketing strategies. A market oriented business knows that to maximise its long-run performance it must build and maintain long-running mutually beneficial relationships and be effective in creating sustainable competitive value for their customers.

It has been noted MO has a need to address the interests of a spectrum of social, political and business (environmental) stakeholders by corporate management. Its current emphasis places internal corporate dynamics as the way to achieve efficiency and profitability. The combination of MO's emphasis on internal corporate dynamics with an added reliance on long-term external social and ecological interactions creates the concept of SMO. SMO allows companies to build on advantages gained through an MO strategy to create a greater alignment of long-term commercial performance with the interests of a wider range of stakeholders. The model of corporate SMO provides for a more comprehensive, stakeholder based approach to corporate management.

=== Macromarketing ===
An early version of sustainable marketing was proposed by van Dam and Apeldoorn through the combination of ecological marketing, green marketing and sustainable marketing, resulting in the concept 'environmental marketing'. Furthermore, Kilbourne, McDonagh and Prothero recognised the dilemma of corporate reliance on the dominant social paradigm and micromarketing. A new marketing paradigm in which macromarketing takes the central role was suggested with the emphasis placed upon business embeddedness in social relationships. It was said corporate marketing management should manage economic, social, cultural and environmental considerations, however marketing practitioners focused on green marketing and overlooked these broader social and environmental responsibilities required. This is where macromarketing literature distinguishes MO from SMO. SMO combines the pursuit for economic benefits with the alignment of corporate marketing activity with social and environmental norms and offers a more comprehensive framework for sustainable marketing. The framework is supported by social, environmental and economic responsibilities.

=== Corporate social responsibility ===
As early as 1969, Lazer recognised a need to bridge the gap between the profit motive and social responsibility. Orlitzky, Schmidt, and Rynes found corporate social performance and corporate financial performance are interlinked. MO holds little commitment for corporations to meet the social and environmental expectations of society. The importance of the combination of corporate social and economic responsibility with environmental responsibility is accounted for in the SMO model thus providing a more holistic approach to corporate marketing management.

=== Sustainable development ===
The MO paradigm guides corporate management with narrow ecological and environmental prescriptions. Sustainable development literature extends MO's parameters with less observance towards the dominant social paradigm and economic performance. In the past conceptualisations of sustainable corporate management and sustainable marketing have often focused on the micromanagement of ecological issues. This only recently has been developed past these views. SMO moves towards corporate marketing meeting market expectations of the responsible application of resources, environmental and social responsibility.

== Benefits ==
If a firm applies SMO to their corporate management strategy it offers them a more socially and environmentally responsible business framework for profitable marketing activity to more effectively sustain long term competitiveness and survival. A firm that utilises SMO are hypothesised to gain enhancement of both brand and firm reputation based on the ability for them to have both efficient and competitive products and services. This is also complemented by societal and market recognition of the firm holding superior social and environmental management. The critical driver for these benefits to the firm will be the integration of organisational intelligence systems, innovation and continuous learning that inform and proactive marketing strategy.

Looking beyond the market place, adopting the SMO perspective will bring forth a greater understanding of societal issues and concerns. Also as SMO becomes a more integrated part of political development, it will highlight potential areas of business risk and areas where new business opportunities may lie.

SMO is a new systematic approach to marketing management that will ensure value to a diverse range of stakeholders by applying management criteria that will add value and assessing to internationally recognised indicators.

== Evaluation ==
SMO firms will be evaluated at a company, local community, or regional level due to the employment of a macromarketing systems approach. Firms can no longer simply focus on the micro or internal environment of their organisations.

When evaluating SMO both proven MO indicators and sustainable development indicators should be used as a starting point. A firm must have capabilities in intelligence generation, organisation coordination, customer orientation, competitor orientation, responsiveness and profit orientation in response to a range of internal (including employees, investors, customers, and business partners) and external (including special interest groups, local communities, government, regulators, and the media) stakeholders. Alignment of corporate marketing management to recognise sustainable management principles such as sustainable consumption and brand management should also be incorporated when assessing a firm's commitment to SMO.

== Later developments ==
=== G. Tomas M. Hult ===
G. Tomas M. Hult has developed further the issue of sustainability, with regards to market orientation. He highlights that in order for an organisation to achieve market-based sustainability they must strategically align themselves with both the consumers wants and needs of a market-orientated product and the interests of the multiple stakeholders concerned about the social responsibility issues involving economic, environmental (ecological), and social dimensions. There is also great emphasis on the importance of the Brundtland Report as the underlying backdrop for both academic and managerial work on sustainability.

== Industry application ==
=== Tourism ===
SMO is becoming increasingly prevalent in the tourism industry with a shift from economic profit priorities towards sustainability and a sustainable tourism marketing model. The emergence of this shift towards sustainability includes the concept of sustainable development put forward by the Brundtland Commission and the preservation of the environment for future use. The sustainability approach adopts an integrated view of marketing, the consideration of social equity, environmental protection, and economic liveability. This paradigm shift traces the evolution of marketing approaches from a consumer oriented basis towards societal, causal, green, relationship marketing alongside the consideration of the triple bottom line. Empirical research into the practical application of the SMO as a management model in the New Zealand tourism sector \found alignment of the SMO model alignment in the strategy management of a government conservation agency and tourism SMEs. The researchers recommended replication research and evaluation in other sectors and countries.

=== Forestry ===
Alongside tourism, the forestry industry is adapting to the paradigm shift and moving towards the embodiment of the principles of sustainable forest management. This industry recognises its responsibility to future generations and the environment. There are many other industries that could benefit from sustainable practices demonstrated in the forestry industry.

=== Agriculture ===
Climate change is already affecting the agriculture sector. The net effect of climate change on world agriculture is likely to be negative, although some regions and crops will benefit, most will not. Adaptation play a significant role in reducing the climate change negative impact on agriculture and increase benefit from climate change (Easterling 1996). Producers can adapt by changing seeding dates, Dynamic fertilization and irrigation applications, and switching one crop to another according to climate changes (Barklacich and Stewart 1995).
