= Micro-enterprise =

Small business employing nine people or fewer

A micro-enterprise, or microenterprise, is generally defined as a small business employing nine people or fewer, and having a balance sheet or turnover less than a certain amount (e.g. €2 million or PhP 3 million). The terms microenterprise and microbusiness have the same meaning, though traditionally when referring to a small business financed by microcredit the term microenterprise is often used. Similarly, when referring to a small, usually legal business that is not financed by microcredit, the term microbusiness (or micro-business) is often used. Internationally, most microenterprises are family businesses employing one or two persons. Most microenterprise owners are primarily interested in earning a living to support themselves and their families. They only grow the business when something in their lives changes and they need to generate a larger income.

== History of the concept ==
The concepts of micro-enterprise and microfinance were pioneered in 1976 by Nobel Prize recipient Muhammad Yunus, founder of the Grameen Bank (Bank of the Rural), in Bangladesh. The bank was established for the purpose of making small loans to the poor − predominantly women – to help them obtain economic self-sufficiency. The fundamental principle behind the Grameen Bank is that credit is a human right. This strategy was highly effective as the bank grew exponentially; from fewer than 15,000 borrowers in 1980, Grameen Bank had 2.34 million members by 1998, 7.67 million at the end of 2008, 97% of whom are women, and 9.4 million today.

== Global definitions ==
The term micro-enterprise or microbusiness refers to different entities and sectors depending on the country.

=== India ===
In India, all the manufacturing and service enterprises having investment "Not more than Rs 1 crore" and Annual Turnover "not more than Rs 5 crore" come under this category.

=== Australia ===
In Australia, the term refers to a business bigger than a single owner-operator, but having up to 5 employees.

=== European Union ===
The European Union (EU) defines "micro-enterprises" as those that meet two of the following three criteria and do not fail to do so for at least 10 years:

- fewer than 10 employees
- balance sheet total below EUR 2 million
- turnover below EUR 2 million .

=== United Kingdom ===
The Office for National Statistics and the Department for Business, Energy and Industrial Strategy both maintain statistical records which officially classify businesses of 1–9 employees as being micro-businesses. The House of Commons Library maintains a briefing note pulling together these statistical sources.

=== United States ===
In the United States, a different model is used, but the stated goals and core values are similar. According to the Small Business Administration, a microenterprise or microbusiness is defined as a business with 1-9 employees. They are the most common type of business. As a subcategory of small businesses, with sales and assets valued at less than $250,000 per year, they generally have less than five employees, including the owner. Additionally, such micro-enterprises generally need less than $35,000 in loan capital as a startup, and do not have access to the conventional commercial banking sector. The basis of microenterprise in the U.S. is entrepreneurship, recognizing that people have the right to apply their individual talents, creativity, and hard work to better their lives.

=== Armenia ===
The 2020 edition of the Armenian Tax Code the concept of micro-enterprise defines in which case the company or sole owner doing business in this form, is exempt from paying sales tax. In Armenia the micro-enterprise business set up can take individual entrepreneurs, people who do some activities but cannot have employees. Starting 1 January 2020 people will be exempted from all main taxes and hire limitless employees for their economic activities. The tax called PIT(personal income tax) consists of 5000ADM for each month.

Micro-enterprise programs, therefore, are built around the philosophy that the unique ideas and skills of entrepreneurs and would-be entrepreneurs should be provided business assistance and small amounts of credit to support the development or start-up of a small business, primarily through the U.S. Small Business Administration. Most organizations in the field also focus their services on those microentrepreneurs who, as defined by federal government standards, are low-to-moderate income. By definition, most of these entrepreneurs are minorities, recent immigrants, women, disabled or for other reasons have special challenges that reduce their ability to access traditional credit and other services.

== Contributions to the larger economy ==
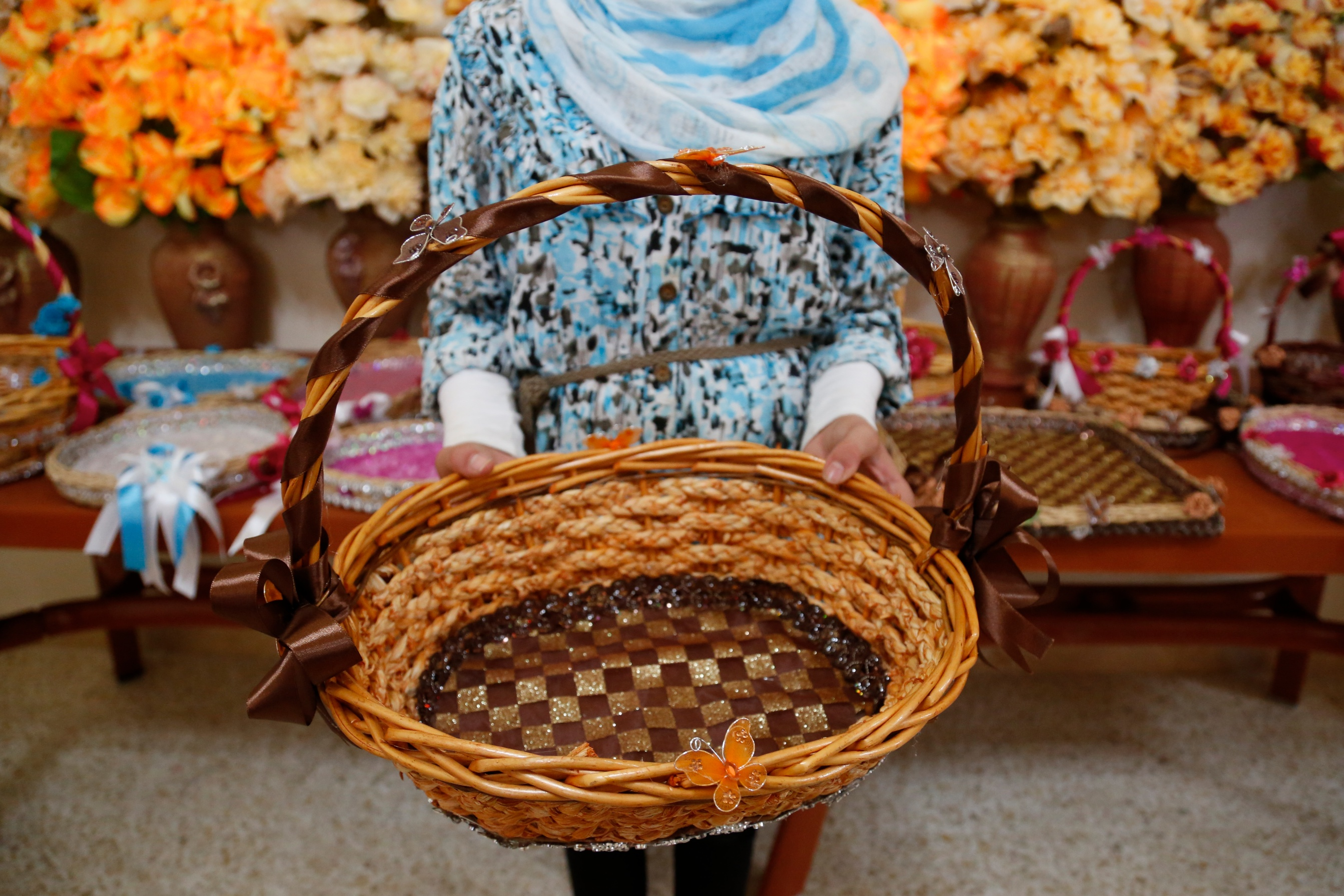
A young Syrian refugee holds a basket that she decorated for sale. Making and selling small crafts or clothes is a common form of micro-business for women.

Microenterprises are said to add value to a country's economy by creating jobs, enhancing income, strengthening purchasing power, lowering costs and adding business convenience. According to information found on the Census.gov website, microenterprises make up 95% of the 28 million US companies tracked by the census. In Poland, in 2012, there were 1.7 million micro-enterprises, employing 3.5 million persons.

In developing countries, microenterprises constitute the vast majority of the small business sector as a result of the relative lack of formal sector jobs available for the poor. Microenterprises in developing countries, then, tend to be the most frequent form/size of business. As explained by Aneel Karnani:

Most microcredit clients are not microentrepreneurs by choice. They would gladly take a factory job at reasonable wages if it were available. We should not romanticize the idea of the "poor as entrepreneurs". The International Labour Organization (ILO) uses a more appropriate term for these people: "own-account workers".

Paper to Pearls is another example of a micro-enterprise program, which is based in the United States, but works with women in northern Uganda.

The International Fund for Agricultural Development (IFAD) Vietnam country programme supports operations in 11 poor provinces. Between 2002 and 2010 around 1,000 saving and credit groups (SCGs) were formed, with over 17,000 members; these SCGs increased their access to microcredit for taking up small-scale farm activities. In the Dominican Republic, a nationwide survey conducted in 1992 revealed that 330,000 micro and small enterprises created employment for 26 percent of the economically active population. Furthermore, a significant portion of this is represented by women (38 percent).

It is argued that the households of women are targeted more directly by microenterprise support services because women tend to devote more of their income to their households, than do men. Therefore, it is recommended that microenterprise training programs be less gender-neutral and should be diversified to address the central challenges of women's businesses.

== Financing ==
Because microenterprises typically have little to no access to the commercial banking sector, they often rely on "micro-loans" or microcredit in order to be financed. Microfinance institutions often finance these small loans, particularly in the Third World. Those who startup microenterprises are usually referred to as entrepreneurs. Micro-loans are a way for organizations and entrepreneurs to make small loans to those in poverty often in third world countries. The term "micro-loans" is more commonly referred to as Microcredit.

== Government programs ==
Government support for microenterprises varies from country to country. Plan for Achieving Self Support is a program offered by the United States Social Security Administration (or SSA) to encourage persons that are Supplemental Security Income (or SSI) eligible who are disabled to set aside moneys for various reasons: training, schooling and funding microenterprise as a Work Goal.

The NEIS (New Enterprise Initiative Scheme) is a government program in Australia, which assists unemployed people to start their own businesses. Although it is not specifically for micro-businesses, many if not most businesses started in this program are micro-businesses (in the senses of having limited capital, and only one person involved in the business).

In the United Kingdom, the Office for National Statistics (ONS) aims to ensure that micro-enterprises are not repeatedly asked to participate in surveys which can be time-consuming for business owners. The "Osmotherly Guarantee", established in 1997, states that as a rule, businesses asked to take part in an ONS survey will be notified of the period during which they will be included, which should generally not exceeding 15 months, and they will be excluded from other statutory surveys during that period, and from further requirements to contribute to other statutory ONS postal surveys for a further three year period.

Ofgem, the UK's energy regulator, makes specific provision for protecting the rights of microbusinesses in relation to gas and electricity suppliers.

In May 2013 David Young, Baron Young of Graham published a report for the government on supporting micro-business growth in the UK, "Growing your business: a report on growing micro businesses".

== Recent development in the United States ==
The microenterprise field has a twenty-year history in the United States. While the term "microenterprise" was in common use internationally by the late 1970s, it came into domestic use within the United States about a decade later. Traditionally, the business sector had been categorized into three groups: large, medium, and small. The U.S. Small Business Administration (SBA) defines a small business as having up to 500 employees. In 1991, the SBA recognized microenterprise as a separate or distinct category of business.

Microloans may be used for general business expenses such as, working capital and tangible assets, such as inventory, furniture, and equipment. They cannot be used to pay the microbusiness owner, to purchase real-estate, pay existing debt, or for non-qualifying not-for-profit entities.

During the 1990s, the microenterprise field grew rapidly in the United States. Starting with a small number of non-profit organizations testing developing country models, the field now has service providers in every state, a national trade association (AEO), a growing number of state-level associations and financing intermediaries, and several research and policy organizations. The Aspen Institute and FIELD (Microenterprise Fund for Innovation, Effectiveness, Learning and Dissemination) has collected data on the organizations in the field since 1992. The first directory, in 1992, listed 108 organizations that identified themselves as working in the field. By 2010 this number had grown to over 800 organizations that provide direct services to entrepreneurs—either microfinancing or business development services.

Community Development Financial Institutions (CDFI's), particularly Community Development Loan Funds frequently offer loan capital for microenterprises in the United States.

Anthony Hilb, author of Make Money with a Microbusiness, and founder of microbusinessowners.com stated, "Microbusinesses have existed since people first exchanged goods and services in their communities. Today, microbusinesses can have a much larger impact; products and services can be exchanged at previously unimagined volumes, distances, and speeds. Credit here is due to advancements in technology. With the internet, apps, and other technologies available (often for free), microbusinesses will continue to explode in popularity."

== In developing countries ==
Organizations such as Grameen Bank and USAID assist in the process of establishing micro-enterprises. Although there is evidence that micro-enterprise has an effect on lowering poverty levels, limited participation among the poor and participation from those not in poverty stifles potential. Additionally, while women majorly take part in microenterprise, the control of credit by male lenders may limit social advancement.

=== Women in the Dominican Republic ===
According to the United Nations, half of the micro-entrepreneurs in the Dominican Republic are women. However, the World Bank estimates that 5% of officially-registered SMEs are owned by women.

== See also ==
- Small business
- Small and medium enterprises
