= Guya Merkle =

Entrepreneur, designer & activist

- Born: c. 1986
- Occupations: Businessperson, jewelry designer, environmental activist

Guya Merkle (born c. 1986) is a German entrepreneur, jewelry designer and environmental activist. She founded the Vieri brand in 2013, which is known to use only fairly traded or recycled gold as the main raw material for its designs.

== Career ==
=== Vieri ===
Her grandfather, Rudolf Merkle (died 1965), founded a jewelry wholesale company in Pforzheim in the late 1930s. He was married to the Italian, Eva Gaietta, a relative of the de la Serra royal family. After the founder's death, his 17-year-old son, Eddy Vieri (died 2007), took over the company and relocated it to Switzerland. Thanks to the fashionable designs of his wife Kate, the company received orders from Japan and the United Arab Emirates in the 1980s. Following the unexpected death of her father, Merkle took over the company in 2007 – completely redesigning it to her own specifications and business ideas.

Her customers now include the music artist Rihanna and actress Emma Watson.

=== Sustainability mission ===
In order to campaign for consumer education, the sustainable improvement of production conditions and fair trade certification of gold mines, Merkle founded the Earthbeat Foundation. Since 2018, Merkle has also been involved with the Wearness, an online marketplace for ethically correct luxury.
