= Microbusiness in France =

In France, a microbusiness (as an auto-entrepreneur or micro-entrepreneur) is defined in accordance with the European Commission's definition: micro-enterprises (or microbusinesses) are companies employing a maximum of 10 people with an annual turnover and total balance sheet below 2 million EUR. The vast majority of micro enterprises (over 99%) are run by only one individual. They can be found mainly in emerging markets where they help to foster economic growth.

== Taxation of micro enterprises ==
France has a tax policy specifically designed for companies with low turnovers. This legal status is legally restricted to freelance workers and employers (FWE)——retailers, artisans and a small number of professionals in private practice. This status is not subject to the usual Value-Added Tax regime (the State does not collect it and the company cannot claim it back) and prevents the company from any claim to governmental support programmes. Apart from these specifics, all microbusinesses abide by other FWE-targeted regulations.

Microbusinesses fall into two groups: trading activities or non-trading activities. The tax status of any given micro enterprise is checked and approved by the tax office. The method of taxation depends on the company's annual turnover, up to 32,000 EUR without VAT (or 80,000 EUR without VAT for retailers).

Should a non-trading microbusiness fall into this tax status, the taxation is calculated over two thirds of the company's total sales over the year (regardless of the company's actual profits).

Should a trading microbusiness fall into this tax status, the taxation is calculated using:

- 29% of the company's total sales over the year (regardless of the company's actual profits) provided the company performs retailing operations;
- 50% of the yearly turnover for all other activities.

The microbusiness legal status was defined in Article 35 of the Economic Growth Incentive Law published on 1 August 2003. Before this law was passed, freelancers were expected to pay taxes either using the micro enterprise tax status defined in Article 50-0 of the General Tax Code or using the Special Declaratory Scheme defined in Article 102 of said General Tax Code. The provisions of the EGI law grant freelancers the ability to opt out of standard conditions for paying social contributions and charges (accounting provisions, regularization, minimum fees to start a business) in favour of the provisions defined in Article L 131-1 and Article L 136-3 of the Social Security Code (SSC).

Article 102 ter of the GTC defines a special declaratory scheme for non-trading profits (classified as BNC, for bénéfices non-commerciaux). This tax status is labelled "micro BNC". Profits from this status is exclusively restricted to people who do not earn more than 32,600 EUR exclusive of VAT over a calendar year (since 2011, the scheme should be valid up to 2013). In this situation, since 2006 the yearly Gross Operating Surplus (GOS) is minored by a 34% rate (was 37%).

Article 50-0 of the GTC defines the microbusiness tax status for crafting/trading/industrial company benefits. In other words, for industrial and commercial benefits (classified as BIC, for bénéfices industriels et commerciaux). This tax status is labelled "micro BIC" and restricted to companies with turnover limitations:

- <82,200 EUR VAT-free for businesses selling goods, food (whether on premises or to take out) or housing services. In this situation, the GOS is minored by a 71% flat-rate reduction since 2006 (was 72%)
- <32,900 EUR VAT-free in any other case of non-trading profit. Since 2006, this allows a 50% flat-rate reduction of the GOS (was 52%)

Note: If the business deals with both types of activities, the total turnover of the company must not exceed 82,200 EUR and the turnover related to non-trading activities must not exceed 32,900 EUR.

A minimum flat-rate reduction of 305 EUR is to be applied to the micro enterprise regardless of their tax status.

== See also ==
- Micro-enterprise
- Sole proprietor
- Partnership
- Independent contractor
- Freelancers
- Entrepreneurship
