= Paper to Pearls =

Micro-enterprise initiative

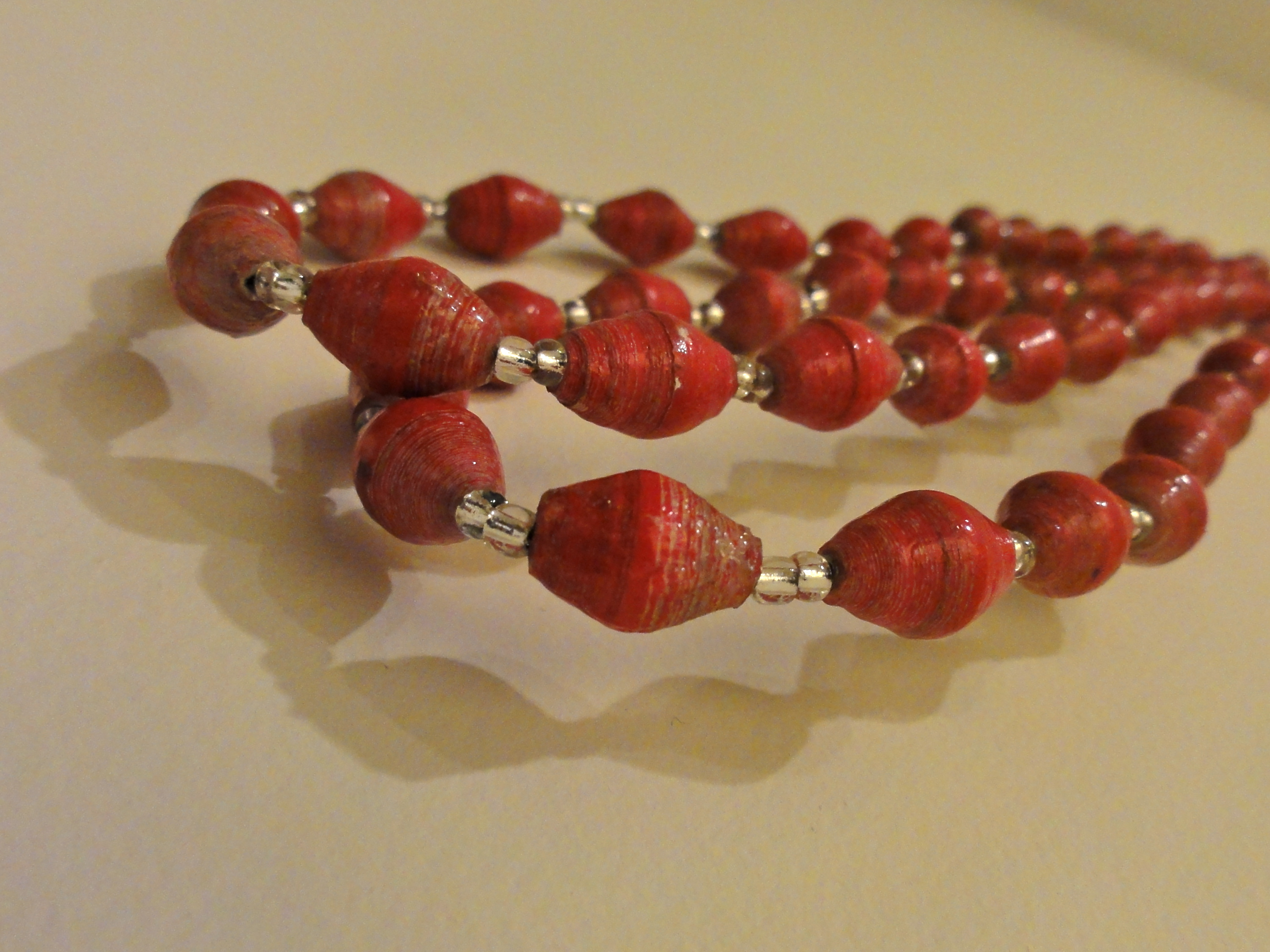
Paper to Pearls necklace

Paper to Pearls is a micro-enterprise initiative of Voices for Global Change, a 501(c)(3) non-profit based in Alexandria, Virginia. Paper to Pearls works with women in the Internally Displaced Persons (IDP) camps in northern Uganda. The women create jewelry by hand-rolling beads from recycled paper, and Paper to Pearls markets and sells the jewelry principally in the United States, but also, via retailers and its website, in countries throughout the world.

Because of Voices' non-profit status, between 75%-85% of the sale proceeds directly benefit the women, both as income as well as ongoing training programs. The income allows the women to purchase food, medicine and schooling for their children. Training programs cover beading skills, entrepreneurship development, and savings and cash management training.

== Geopolitical context ==
Since 1987, the Lord’s Resistance Army has been leading an armed rebellion in the northern region of Uganda, leading to widespread human rights violations and safety concerns. At the height of the conflict, it was estimated that roughly 1.8 million people had been relocated to the IDP camps. Though a cease-fire was signed in 2006, the peace process has since stalled due to the repeated refusals of the LRA leader, Joseph Kony, to sign a final peace agreement.

As of February 2009, it was estimated that 710,000 displaced persons remained in camps throughout the region.

== Project history ==
Paper to Pearls was founded by Barbara Moller, after she worked in northern Uganda as a government and civil coalition trainer on a US State Department grant in the fall of 2005. Barbara was invited to the camps by a participant of the training program and introduced to women who had started creating the paper bead jewelry as an income stream. With no previous experience in retail or micro-enterprise, Barbara decided to launch Paper to Pearls in order to give the women access to broader, developed markets.

The program began with 40 women in two camps. Currently, Paper to Pearls works with 10 beading cooperatives in seven camps and the town of Gulu in northern Uganda. As of April 2009, the project includes ~125 women, ranging in age from 15 to 60 years old.

In 2008, the project was expanded to include a group of child-mothers—girls who had been kidnapped by the LRA and forced to be child soldiers or sex-slaves. The intent was to create both income opportunities and to re-integrate the girls into society, overcoming the community’s belief that they and their babies are ‘dirty’ because of their association with the rebels.

== Jewelry ==
Each bead is rolled by hand from strips of recycled paper, secured with glue, and then lacquered with a non-toxic varnish for shine and durability. The women assemble the beads into necklaces, bracelets, earrings and eyeglass holders. In addition to supporting the empowerment of women, Paper to Pearls necklaces, bracelets and earrings are eco-chic and fashionable.

Paper to Pearls uses a variety of methods to market its jewelry. They maintain an online store, as well as selling through retail outlets, primarily in the Washington DC Metro Area. In addition, they pursue a bead party model, which relies on individuals hosting private sales events in their homes or inviting their friends to designation shopping times at the online store (akin to a Tupperware Party).

Paper to Pearls jewelry was featured as part of the Paper Jewelry exhibit at the Triennale Design Museum in Milan, Italy. The concept of the exhibit, celebrating the transformation of a humble medium into a fashion statement, is epitomized by the work of the beaders.
