= IFAD Vietnam =

UN agency to combat poverty

The International Fund for Agricultural Development (IFAD) is an international financial institution and a specialized agency of the United Nations dedicated to eradicating rural poverty in Vietnam and other developing countries. IFAD supports more than 200 ongoing programmes and projects around the world.

IFAD works for and with the poorest people in Vietnam, including ethnic minorities, small-scale farmers and households headed by women. Strategies to reduce poverty and improve living conditions include building partnerships, strengthening institutional capacity and promoting participation. IFAD works with the government and other partners to empower poor rural people so they can have a role in decision-making. To do this, IFAD finances programmes and projects that focus on developing and testing innovative approaches to poverty reduction that can be replicated and scaled up by the government and other agencies. Interventions are area-based and multisectoral. They target regions where poverty reduction is a priority.

IFAD's Vietnam country programme is aligned to the government of Vietnam's Social Economic Development Plan (SEDP) 2006–2010, and to the principles of the Hanoi Core Statement.

== Strategy ==
Over the last five years, the IFAD country programme in Vietnam has retained a strategic focus on participatory planning; increasing the capacity of poor rural people to participate in local decision-making processes; decentralization and community-driven development; increasing the assets of poor communities; and support for small-scale infrastructure. In response to Vietnam's dynamic rural development, in the last three years aspects of market-oriented approaches to poverty reduction and institutional sustainability have taken on increasing importance. Particularly central are improving access to markets; promoting private-sector growth; delivering services for market-oriented poverty reduction; and mainstreaming poverty-focused, market-oriented approaches and methodologies in rural, public-sector institutions.

The starting point for IFAD’s country programme for 2008-2012 was the growing disparity between rural and urban areas, particularly the plight of ethnic minorities (EM) in upland areas.^{*} The Country Strategic Opportunities Programme (COSOP) identified IFAD's comparative advantage in Vietnam as being the development of innovative methods for linking poverty reduction with market-oriented agricultural and rural development; forming strong partnerships with provinces; and promoting government ownership. In this COSOP period, IFAD interventions will promote the adoption of climate change mitigation and adaptation measures, as appropriate.

Building on extensive dialogue with the government, the COSOP 2008-2012 focuses on four interlinked strategic objectives (SOs):

- Rural poor households in uplands access markets through increased private-sector partnerships
- Poor and vulnerable households take advantage of profitable business opportunities
- Upland poor communities secure access to, and derive sustained benefits from, productive natural assets
- The rural poor contribute to pro-poor agricultural, market-driven policy processes at subnational levels
- ‘Uplands’ is a term used by the Committee for Ethnic Minorities (CEM) and refers to 20 highland and midland mountainous provinces in central and northern Vietnam. In addition, there are 114 upland districts in 26 other provinces. The uplands have a complicated topography and are generally inhabited by ethnic minority groups.

== Projects and programmes ==
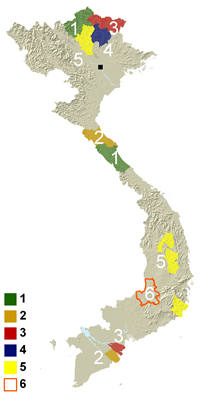
Ongoing programmes IFAD Vietnam

=== Six programmes in nine provinces ===
- Decentralised Programme for Rural Poverty Reduction (DPRPR): Ha Giang and Quang Binh
- Programme for Improving Market Participation of the Poor (IMPP): Ha Tinh and Tra Vinh
- Developing Business with the Rural Poor Programme (DBRP): Cao Bang and Ben Tre
- Pro-Poor Partnership for Agro-Forestry Development (3PAD): Bac Kan
- Tam Nong Support Project (TNSP): Gia Lai, Ninh Thuan and Tuyen Quang
- Project for the Economic Empowerment of Ethnic Minorities (3EM): Dak Nong

== Programme results and impact ==
IFAD's country programme supports operations in 11 poor provinces of Vietnam. From 2002 to 2010 in Tuyen Quang province, the country programme supported poverty reduction and economic growth through the promotion of participatory, decentralized community development, and targeted poor upland ethnic minority groups and women. The country programme worked in 823 Tuyen Quang villages and reached over 75,700 beneficiaries, of whom 49,000 were women and 55,000 were from ethnic minority groups.

=== Achievements ===
Achievements include

- The majority of beneficiary households improved their food security, thanks to an increase in average food availability of 72 kilograms per capita in 2009.
- 1,000 saving and credit groups (SCGs) were formed, with over 17,000 members, of whom 75 per cent were from ethnic minority groups and 76 per cent were women; the SCGs increased their access to microcredit for taking up small-scale farm activities.
- 65,000 families received capacity-building services in upland farming provided by the over 2,600 farmers’ field schools training sessions and over 360 demonstrations. approximately 40,000 households reported a productivity increase of 14-20 per cent thanks to the demonstrations and field schools.
- 5,700 school children received partial funding for their education, among whom 51 per cent were girls.
- 824 village animal health workers were trained, resulting in a reduction in livestock diseases and improved diversification of farmers’ income.

Around 1,500 village infrastructures (such as irrigation channels and village roads) were constructed with support from the village infrastructure development funds supported by the country programme. Of the beneficiary households:

- 85-90 per cent had road access to markets
- 60 per cent had access to stable irrigation water
- 87 per cent had access to clean domestic water
- 90 per cent had access to electricity

These infrastructures have contributed to improving farm and non-farm production, and village operation and maintenance groups have been formed for each infrastructure scheme.

=== Programme and project examples ===
There are six ongoing IFAD-funded programmes and projects in Vietnam. The Decentralized Programme for Rural Poverty Reduction (DPRPR) began in 2005. It focuses on two of the poorest communities in the country, Ha Giang and Quang Binh, each with a unique geography and climate. The programme's goal is to improve the productivity, income levels and food security of poor households, especially of ethnic minorities and women.

==== Ha Giang province ====
The programme has reached about 50,000 households (186,000 individuals) and has achieved the following results:

- 352 Village Management Groups (VMGs) comprising almost 5,000 members have been established to plan, implement and monitor development activities ensuring the participation of poor ethnic minority households and women.
- 72 provincial, 132 district and 1,400 commune staff have benefited from project training in better management of decentralization, participatory planning, and management and implementation of village infrastructure schemes.
- 267 savings groups (4,900 members) have been created.
- 240 operation and maintenance groups have been formed to ensure sustainability of small-scale infrastructure, and 1,500 people have been trained.
- 206 kilometres of roads have been constructed.

==== Quang Binh province ====
The programme has promoted income generation activities in value chains, and infrastructure development (small irrigation schemes, village roads and markets places). By the end of 2009 approximately 45,900 households had received programme-funded services

- 137 infrastructure projects were carried out, of which 71 were road construction or rehabilitation projects and 23 were irrigation infrastructure projects; others include schools and kindergartens, bridges, markets, commune buildings, and supply of water and electricity.
- 2,172 people were trained in infrastructure maintenance.

These infrastructure investments have resulted in a high level of social benefit to beneficiaries by improving their access to services. Improved irrigation infrastructure projects have also had a positive economic impact by reducing fluctuations in expected yield.

The objective of the Programme for Improving Market Participation of the Poor (IMPP) in Ha Tinh and Tra Vinh provinces is to raise the incomes of poor rural people in 50 communes in Ha Tinh province and 30 communes in Tra Vinh province by improving their access to labour, finance, commodities and service markets. IIMP began in 2007.

==== Tra Vinh province ====
The project has reached about 44,000 people. All targeted communes have developed their Commune Market Opportunity Planning (CMOP), which includes at least three pro-poor, priority local value chains and two cross-cutting issues. Around 270 village awareness seminars on market-based approaches have been conducted and 377 common interest groups (CIGs) related to the value chains have been established, with about 10,300 household members. One third of the CIGs’ household members are poor, and the CIGs facilitate their engagement in these value chains: The groups can buy inputs collectively at a better price and can sell their produce to traders and markets in bulk, enabling them to negotiate higher prices. Moreover, by being part of the CIGs, the poor household members have an opportunity to work with better-off farmers, who have more experience in production practices and market linkages.

==== Ha Tinh province ====
Around 76,000 people have received project services in 50 communes. At mid-term, IMPP had supported the establishment of 123 CIGs (over 4,600 members) related to the main value chains; of these, 60 per cent are women and 56 per cent of households are poor. Ten cooperative groups (CGs) with 452 member households and two cooperatives with 155 members have been formed; two thirds of the members are poor. The CGs and cooperatives also facilitate farmers’ linkages to the value chains and their engagement with better-off farmers. Moreover, after receiving IMPP-promoted vocational and enterprise training, around 1,400 people have found stable jobs for at least six months.

The Developing Business with the Rural Poor Programme (DBRP) began in 2008. The programme's goal is to help develop market and business opportunities for poor rural people in Ben Tre and Cao Bang provinces.

==== Ben Tre province ====
In its first year the DBRP programme reached about 45,000 beneficiaries and achieved the following results:

- 5,100 beneficiaries have accessed the programme's market information, business registration and business advisory services.
- 190 government officials and staff have been trained in agricultural extension and technology.
- 510 male and 165 female government officials and staff have been trained in community-based management.
- Over 360 people have been trained in business and entrepreneurship, of whom 165 were women.
- About 450 staff of service providers have been trained in value chain development and market orientation, of whom over 120 were women.
- 550 men and women have been trained in financial services.
- 1,300 women have been trained in community management topics.

==== Cao Bang province ====
In its first year, the DBRP programme reached about 21,000 beneficiaries. Progress has been slower in Cao Bang. Nevertheless, some results can already be identified:

- 270 marketing groups have been formed or strengthened.
- 280 beneficiaries have been trained in business and entrepreneurship.
- Over 1,100 men and 1,200 women have been trained in crop production practices and technologies.
- 4,500 women have been trained in livestock production practices and technologies.
- Over 1,200 people have been trained in financial services.
- Over 800 men and 700 women have been trained in community management topics.17

== Partners ==
IFAD's development partners in Vietnam include the United Nations Development Programme (UNDP) and the Swedish International Development Agency (Sida), which have financed grants supporting technical assistance and training in four of IFAD's five projects implemented in the country. Another partner, the Government of Italy, will finance capacity-building activities in Gia Lai province, where IFAD may invest at a later date. In the recently approved Programme for Improving Market Participation for the Poor, the German Agency for Technical Cooperation (GTZ) is providing technical assistance. The programme is a partner in the Making Markets Work Effectively for the Poor (M4P) initiative supported by DFID and the Asian Development Bank.

In the poor provinces where IFAD projects are, initial management capacity is usually limited. Grants finance technical assistance that supports capacity-building in local and grass-roots institutions. Grant-related activities introduce innovative ideas for targeting rural poor people and enabling them to participate in the decisions affecting their lives. They also bring gender issues into the mainstream of the development process.

Working as partners in the Decentralized Programme for Rural Poverty Reduction in Ha Giang and Quang Binh provinces, IFAD and Norway have agreed upon a US$5.0 million debt swap for incremental investment activities.

Sharing lessons learned in the process of decentralization and community-driven development is one of the subjects on the agenda of the IFAD-funded Country Programme, to be taken up in the context of national policies and programmes in collaboration with other development agencies, multilateral and bilateral agencies and international and local NGOs.

== Rural poverty in Vietnam ==
Steady and strong growth in recent years have fuelled Vietnam's ambitions to move up to middle-income country status. A net importer of food during the early 1980s, Vietnam has become one of the biggest rice exporters in the world. The agriculture sector accounts for more than 22 per cent of GDP, 30 per cent of exports and 52 per cent of all employment. Past agricultural growth was largely based on bringing additional physical factors of production into use, including land, irrigation water, labour and new technologies. Further growth acceleration in Vietnam during the 1990s was brought about through institutional restructuring that created incentives to invest and enhance productivity in a market-oriented economy. For example, the effects on agricultural growth of price liberalization and land titling were dramatic. The rural sector has shown resilience and a capacity for change and adaptation. The growth in agricultural output contributed greatly to improved household income, as roughly 70 per cent of the Vietnamese population is engaged in agricultural activities.

Meanwhile, the country's poorest rural people generally have small plots of low-quality land or are landless, and their opportunities for off-farm employment are scarce. The poorest people live in remote villages in upland areas, with limited access to transportation and social interaction. Rural poor people have limited access to productive resources and basic financial services such as credit and savings. Village, commune, district and regional infrastructure is poorly developed. Rural poor people face harsh natural conditions and frequent natural disasters. They are particularly vulnerable to seasonal hardships, community-wide crises and unexpected events, such as disease, which increase a household's expenses and reduce income. Poor households tend to include more dependants, especially children. Among age groups, poverty disproportionately affects children. Poor people, particularly ethnic minorities, are often uninformed about their rights and lack access to legal assistance.

The poorest people in Viet Nam include

- members of the country's 53 ethnic minority groups, who depend mainly on forest resources for a livelihood (they constitute only 13 per cent of the population but account for almost 30 per cent of poor people)
- people living in remote upland areas with a poor natural resource base
- people living in coastal areas that are more prone to adverse climatic events
- households headed by women
- households with disabled members
- migrants
- landless people

There are broad regional variations in the distribution of poverty. The regions with the highest relative poverty rates include the north-west, north-central, central highlands, central coast and north-east. But in terms of absolute numbers, more poor people live in the north-central and north-east regions, in the Mekong Delta and central coastal regions, which are home to seven out of 10 of Vietnam's poor people.

== See also ==
- Poverty
- Food security
- Development Finance Institution
