= Consumer =

User of a product or service

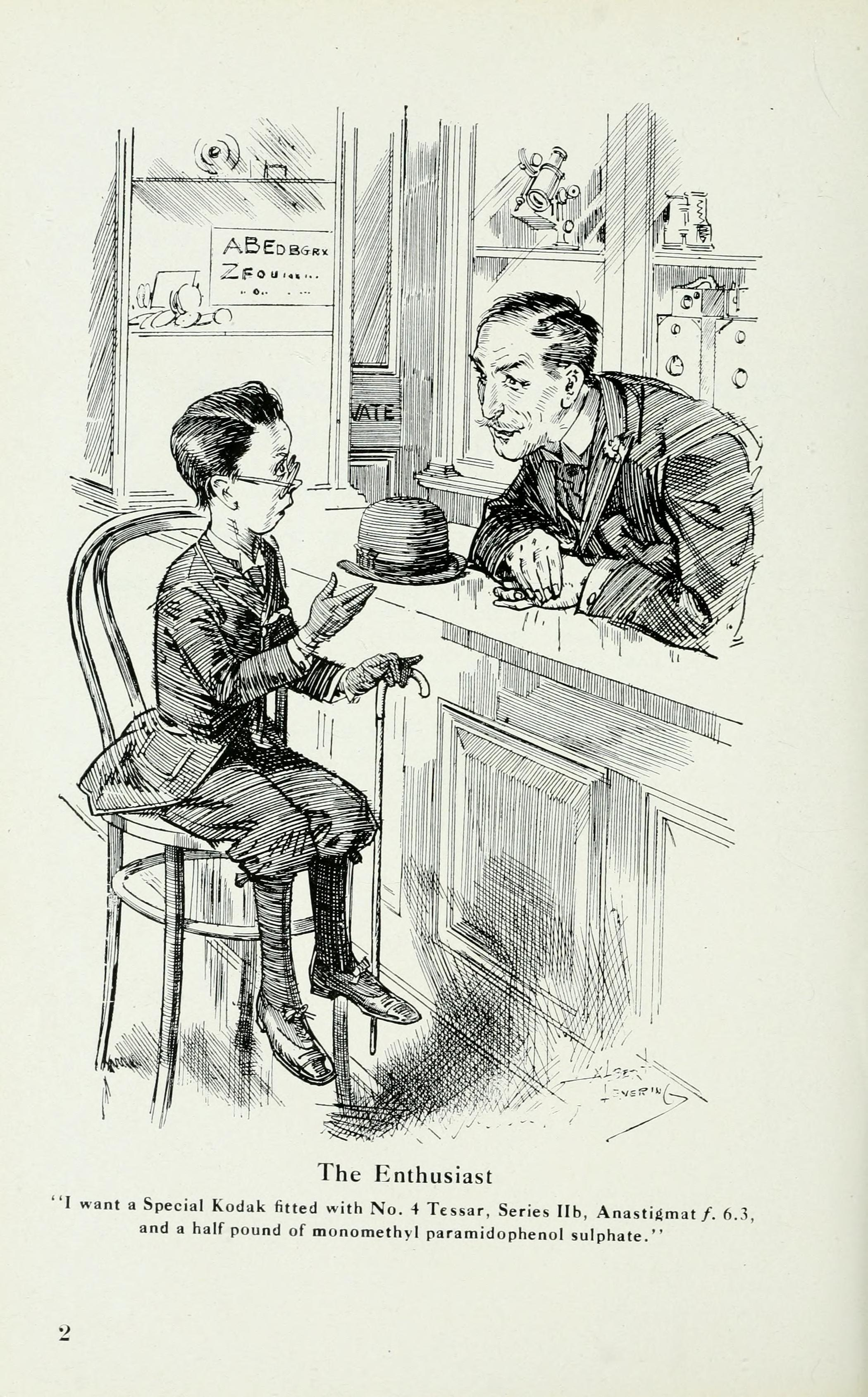
Consumer

A consumer is a person or a group who intends to order, or use purchased goods, products, or services primarily for personal, social, family, household and similar needs, who is not directly related to entrepreneurial or business activities. The term most commonly refers to a person who purchases goods and services for personal use.

== Rights ==
"Consumers, by definition, include us all", said President John F. Kennedy, offering his definition to the United States Congress on March 15, 1962. This speech became the basis for the creation of World Consumer Rights Day, now celebrated on March 15. In his speech, John Fitzgerald Kennedy outlined the integral responsibility to consumers from their respective governments to help exercise consumers' rights, including:

- The right to safety: To be protected against the marketing of goods that are hazardous to health or life.
- The right to be informed: To be protected against fraudulent, deceitful, or grossly misleading information, advertising, labeling, or other practices, and to be given the facts he needs to make an informed choice.
- The right to choose: To be assured, wherever possible, access to a variety of products and services at competitive prices; and in those industries in which competition is not workable and Government regulation is substituted, an assurance of satisfactory quality and service at fair prices.
- The right to seek redressal: Consumers have the right to seek redressal against unfair trade practices and exploitation. If any damage is done to a consumer, he has the right to get compensation depending on the degree of damage.
- The right to represent: Thus, the Act has enabled us as consumers to have the right to represent in the consumer courts.

== Economics and marketing ==
In an economy, a consumer buys goods or services primarily for consumption and not for resale or for commercial purposes. Consumers pay some amount of money (or equivalent) for goods or services.) then consume (use up). As such, consumers play a vital role in the economic system of a capitalist system and form a fundamental part of any economy.

Without consumer demand, producers would lack one of the key motivations to produce: to sell to consumers. The consumer also forms one end of the chain of distribution.

Recently in marketing, instead of marketers generating broad demographic profiles and Fisio-graphic profiles of market segments, marketers have started to engage in personalized marketing, permission marketing, and mass customization to target potential consumers.

Largely due to the rise of the Internet, consumers are shifting more and more toward becoming prosumers, consumers who are also producers (often of information and media on the social web) - they influence the products created (e.g. by customization, crowdfunding or publishing their preferences), actively participate in the production process, or use interactive products.

== Law and politics ==
The law primarily uses a notion of the consumer in relation to consumer protection laws, and the definition of consumer is often restricted to living persons (not corporations or businesses) and excludes commercial users. A typical legal rationale for protecting the consumer is based on the notion of policing market failures and inefficiencies, such as inequalities of bargaining power between a consumer and a business. As all potential voters are also consumers, consumer protection has a clear political significance.

Concern over the interests of consumers has spawned consumer activism, where organized activists do research, education and advocacy to improve the offer of products and services. Consumer education has been incorporated into some school curricula. There are also various non-profit publications, such as Which?, Consumer Reports and Choice magazine, dedicated to assist in consumer education and decision making.

In India, the Consumer Protection Act of 1986 differentiates the consumption of a commodity or service for personal use or to earn a livelihood. Only consumers are protected per this act and any person, entity or organization purchasing a commodity for commercial reasons are exempted from any benefits of this act.

== See also ==
- Alpha consumer
- Customer
- Consumer behaviour
- Consumer debt
- Consumer leverage ratio
- Consumer organization
- Consumer reporting agency
- Consumer choice
- Consumer culture
- Consumer culture theory
- Consumerism
- Consumption
- Consumers' co-operative
- Consumption
- Informed consumer
- Consumer rights
