= Choice editing =

Choice editing refers to the active process of controlling or limiting the choices available to consumers so as to drive to an end goal, specifically by banning things or imposing punitive taxation. The term has gained currency in discussions about sustainability.

== Definition ==
The Sustainable Development Commission defined "choice editing" as "...shifting the field of choice for mainstream consumers: cutting out unnecessarily damaging products and getting real sustainable choices on the shelves." The process involves "...[removing] environmentally offensive products from commercial consideration or [making] such products expensive to use." Choice editing is a direct control of the impact from consumption and aims to only provide sustainable products in the market. Not only products can be edited out or replaced, but also product components, processes and business models.

== History ==
Choice editing is nothing new. It has been around through standards, taxes, tariffs and subsidies that made certain products more desirable for consumers than others. The Sustainable Development Roundtable in 2006 announced that in the past choice editing was a major driver of “green” innovations, which suggests its potential to increase sustainable consumption.

== Actors ==
Governments and policy makers can edit citizens’ choices through laws, taxes, subsidies and voluntary bans. Businesses can edit choice by removing products from their range that might have negative impact on health or environment. Additionally, they can control their value chain and together with suppliers, processors and retailers develop solutions for more sustainable products and processes. A close collaboration along the value chain is important as the product’s environmental and social performance reflects the whole life-cycle assessment.

Retailers can actively "edit out" choices by not stocking products that they, or the state, consider to have an unacceptable environmental impact, thus being unsustainable options. Moreover, retailers can edit choice by requiring their suppliers to meet certain criteria.

== Examples ==
Editing by policy makers - light bulb ban

The Australian government phased out incandescent light bulbs by 2010 as a step towards preventing possible electricity shortages and reducing greenhouse gas emissions. They were replaced by compact fluorescent lamps (CFLs) and LED lamps. The expected consequences are reducing greenhouse gas emissions by 4 million tons per year from 2012. The European Union is following Australia’s example by removing all incandescent bulbs by 2012. Many other countries such as Canada, the United States and Indonesia will do so as well.

Banning a product component – Henkel

Henkel took over the Brazilian company Alba in 2006. Some of the company’s adhesive products contained toluene, which was misused by young people for glue sniffing. After the takeover, Henkel developed a toluene-free formula and by 2007 introduced the toluene-free brand Cascola.

Editing the supply chain – Adidas

Adidas supports its suppliers in order to reduce their environmental impact by developing training materials, technical guidelines and workshop tailored to each supplier’s special need.

This way Adidas actively edits the environmental impact of its supply chain.

Editing processes – Tijin

Tijin is a Japanese company operating in the chemical industry. They edited their business processes by developing a recycling system for polyester. This reduces energy and resource use, CO_{2} emission and waste. Tijin established a global network with companies that collect polyester garments for recycling and support the expansion of products containing recycled polyester.

Editing the corporate behavior - Hipp

As assessed by Belz and Peattie (2009), Prof. Dr Claus Hipp's philosophy of appropriate corporate behavior covering market, employees, the state and nature makes his baby foods company highly coveted by consumers. The company's ethics commission believes in economic fair play that can match the consumer's willingness to pay while processing the highest quality of organic raw materials that are sustainably grown. While many manufacturing companies' sustainability goals are towards the nature and the environment, Hipp takes a long-term ambition to survive in nature, as a part of it.

== Controversy ==
An often raised ethical question in this matter is, whether consumers should choose freely or not. Should items be simply removed from their choices? Who decides what is removed and why? Some argue that instead of choice editing, labeling should provide information about the social and environmental performance of a product. Based on that, consumers are free to choose between sustainable and unsustainable products themselves.

The opposite opinion is held by Tim Lang, professor of food policy at City University London and a prominent figure in Britain's food industry. In an interview with The Guardian journalist Leo Hickman, Lang argues that the consumer need not be bothered in the supermarket aisle to agonise over complex issues such as animal welfare, carbon footprints, workers' rights and excessive packaging, often without any meaningful data on the label to inform their decision-making. Lang instead suggested that the manufacturers and retailers should take more responsibility by making most of these decisions on consumer's behalf before the product even reaches the shelves. This would in turn allow the consumer to avoid endorsing products that are damaging to the environment as well as the society.

Furthermore, there is still no agreement on who defines if a product is sustainable or unsustainable. Therefore, decisions made about the availability of a product can cause conflicts between the different actors like government, policy makers, businesses and consumers as they might have varying views concerning the sustainable or unsustainable nature of a product.
