= Plan for Achieving Self Support =

Plan to Achieve Self Support, also known as a "PASS", is a program offered by the US Social Security Administration (SSA) for disabled or blind individuals who receive or qualify for Supplemental Security Income. The PASS program's main purpose is to help a disabled individual find employment or return to work.

The requirements for a PASS are the following:

1. It must be in writing (using the form on the website)
2. The planner must already have an income or resources set aside to pay for the plan expenses
3. The plan must state a work goal (i.e., a vocational assessment of skills and how much to grow in the next year; must be attainable)
4. The plan must have a reasonable time frame with a projected beginning and end, as well as a detailed calendar of projected goals
5. The plan must include detailed expenses of necessities to achieve the work goal.
