= Market orientation =

Market orientation is the extent to which an organisation behaves in response to a given market. Kohli and Jaworski define market orientation as "the organization-wide generation of market intelligence, dissemination of the intelligence across departments and organization-wide responsiveness to it". Narver and Slater define market orientation as "the organization culture that most effectively and efficiently creates the necessary behaviours for the creation of superior value for buyers and, thus, continuous superior performance for the business".

Kohli and Jaworski consider market orientation as the implementation of the marketing concept, whereas Carver and Slater consider it to be an organizational culture. According to the former authors, the marketing concept is a business philosophy, whereas the term market orientation refers to the actual implementation of the marketing concept. They added that market orientation "provide[s] a unifying focus for the efforts and projects of individuals and departments within the organization." As such, they consider market orientation to be an organisational culture consisting of three behavioral components, namely, i) customer orientation, ii) competitor orientation and iii) interfunctional coordination. Empirical study found that among all three behavioral components, interfunctional coordination has the most significant influence on new product success.

Perspectives of market orientation include the decision-making perspective, market intelligence perspective, culturally based behavioural perspective, strategic perspective and customer orientation perspective.

== The shifting source of competitive advantage ==
Niraj Dawar argues that competitive advantage is shifting from a firm’s “upstream activities” such as sourcing, production, logistics and product innovation to “downstream activities”. In doing so, Dawar expands on the notion of market orientation: Instead of bringing better products to market or increasing operational and asset efficiencies, downstream activities focus instead on what else the firm can do for the customer: The core focus of the business has tilted from product and production, to customers and the market. Thus, competitive advantage exists externally to the firm, enabling the company to build lasting differentiation by creating new forms of customer value. Consequently, it is the firm’s perceived position in the eyes of the customer that matters, in the context of shifting purchase criteria, and not product innovation.

Customer perceptions can be shaped through an increased focus on building trust, changing the customer’s purchasing criteria and defining the competitive set. By also tailoring the offering to specific consumption circumstances and reducing customer costs and risk, value is created for customers through downstream innovation. Finally, the firm can build accumulative competitive advantage from network effects and also by accumulating and leveraging customer datasets.

== Measurement scales ==
In order to measure market orientation, the two most widely used scales are MARKOR and MKTOR

The MKTOR scale is a 15-item, 7-point Likert-type scale, with all points specified. In this measure, market orientation is conceptualised as a one-dimensional construct, with three components, namely: customer orientation, competitor orientation, and interfunctional coordination. The simple average of the scores of the three components is the market orientation score.

On the other hand, the MARKOR scale is a 20-item, 5-point Likert scale, with only the ends of the scale specified. Here market orientation is again composed of three components, namely: intelligence generation, intelligence dissemination, and responsiveness.

=== Evaluation Scales (Deshpande 1998) ===
- Our business objectives are driven primarily by customer satisfaction.
- We constantly monitor our level of commitment and orientation to serving customer needs.
- We freely communicate information about our successful and unsuccessful customer experiences across all business functions.
- Our strategy for competitive advantage is based on our understanding of customers’ needs.
- We measure customer satisfaction systematically and frequently.
- We have routine or regular measures of customer service.
- We are more customer focused than our competitors.
- I believe this business exists primarily to serve customers.
- We poll end user's at least once a year to assess the quality of our products and services.
- Data on customer satisfaction are disseminated at all levels in this business unit on a regular basis.

== See also ==
- Marketing
- Marketing management
- Marketing strategy
- Production orientation
- Societal marketing
- Sustainable market orientation
