= Consumer education =

Information given to the consumer about goods and services

Consumer education is the preparation of an individual to be capable of making informed decisions when it comes to purchasing products in a consumer culture. It generally covers various consumer goods and services, prices, what the consumer can expect, standard trade practices, etc. While consumer education can help consumers to make more informed decisions, some researchers have found that its effects can drop off over time, suggesting the need for continual education. New dimensions of consumer education are also beginning to emerge as people become more aware of the need for ethical consumerism and sustainable consumer behaviour in our increasingly globalized society.

== Background ==
Consumer education is an education that can be found in several areas of study in the formal school curriculum and incorporated knowledge from many disciplines, including: economics, game theory, information theory, law, mathematics, and psychology. The goal of teaching the subject is to help people understand in what ways we, as humans, traditionally make oversights in decision-making, so that we can be more self-aware and try to use that information to make more critical and useful decisions. It is especially important in a consumerist society, where many options are available, but rarely ever of equal quality, and where many options take advantage of our biases when we lack complete information, are in need of something urgently (like food while grocery shopping), our preference for familiar and common things, or when we have uneasy feelings. Training for teachers also include instruction regarding different branches of consumerism.

Consumer education focuses on both functional skills and rights. These two elements are inseparable in the sense that awareness of several rights leads to functional skills. There are also instances when consumer education is conducted for the purpose of changing consumer perceptions, such as the educational drive to increase consumer confidence in for example e-commerce.

== Subject matter ==
Traditionally, the subject matter taught in consumer education would be found under the label home economics. Beginning in the late 20th century, however, with the rise of consumerism, the need for an individual to manage a budget, make informed purchases, and save for the future have become paramount. The outcomes of consumer education include not only the improved understanding of consumer goods and services, but also increased awareness of the consumer's rights in the consumer market and better capability to take actions to improve consumer well-being.

Subjects included in consumer education also vary from country to country. For instance, in the United Kingdom the focus is on the protection of children from the effects of exploitative consumer society, while in the Philippines the emphasis is more on issues related to the more immediate public interest (e.g., boiling water before drinking it, examining sugar for impurities).

== Consumer education for families ==
Consumer education helps families gain information to make cost effective choices in child care. The goal for consumer education for families is to reduce the financial burden to quality child care by reviewing trusted information to become their own advocates. This is done by providing education to parents on the awareness of early education and childcare as well as the financial assistance that may be needed by low income families to attend public or private pre-K facilities. The National Center for Children in Poverty (NCCP) defines consumer education for families as raising awareness on child care that meets the familial demands through a continuum of skills to expand knowledge, increase variety, and an increase in resources that families can use.

== Consumer education around the world ==
In multiple countries home economists have contributed in strengthening these programs aimed at women, families, and children. These programs aim to teach women formally and informally education, increase understanding and appreciation of other cultures, improving public health, and improving the process of introducing change.

A few professional organizations have facilitated international involvement. Some of these include the International Federation of Home Economics (IFHE), American Home Economics Association now the American Association of Family and Consumer Sciences (AAFCS), and the American Association of State Universities and Land Grant Colleges (AASULGC) now the National Association of State Universities and Land-Grant Colleges (NASULGC).

Economists in the United States become more involved outside their country around the twentieth century when mission boards hired graduates to assist in establishing home economics departments in other countries to improve living conditions of the people. In the United States, a few states have set up consumer education programs that aim at educating future populations. Texas Office of Consumer Credit Consumer aims to educate Texans to be financially literate and to make good decisions as a consumer.

In Australia, consumer education starts in years 9 and 10 as an elective course during their educational career.

== Health and nutrition in consumerism ==
The Food and Drug Administration (FDA) is responsible for protecting the public health by assuring the safety, efficacy, and security of human and veterinary drugs, biological products, medical devices, our nation's food supply, cosmetics, and products that emit radiation. The FDA also provides accurate, science-based health information to the public. Making any health claims without the FDA reviewing it first is illegal. This is not the case for structural or functional claims on conventional food.

Consumers are becoming increasingly health-conscious and most agree that eating healthy is a better way to prevent illness than using medication. An increased consciousness of eating healthy among consumers has led to more consumers buying functional foods who are marketed with scientifically substantiated claims to improve health and well-being. The American dietetic Association supports the use of health claims that have previously been approved by the Food and Drug Administration (FDA) but stresses the importance of health claims on food being supported by a program of health and nutrition. Multiple sources have to support these claims to make sure there are no unbalanced messages received by the consumer.

Common findings from studies on health and nutrition in consumerism were:

- Health claims on food are seen by consumers as useful, and when a product features a health claim consumers view it as healthier and state, they are more likely to purchase it.
- Consumers are skeptical when companies make the claim of their product having health benefits but strongly agree when the government makes a claim.
- Consumers do not clearly distinguish between nutrition content claims, structure function claims and health claims.

To make sure consumers are being influenced by the claims that are made, it is important that consumers are being exposed and pay attention to the claim, that they have an understanding of the claim and that they have a change in their attitude and belief. after that it is important to maintain this behavior change.

== See also ==
- Consumerism
- Credit counseling
- Family and consumer science
- Financial education
- Financial literacy
- Ethical consumerism
- Sustainable consumption
