= Informed consumer =

The concept of the informed consumer is fundamental in the law of the European Union. Since the European Council Resolution of 14 April 1975, one of the primary objectives of the European Community, and then the European Union, has been the provision of information to consumers. The rationale is that market actors are enabled to make better choices when they are informed and have a greater capacity to understand the importance of their market actions and choices.

== Definition ==
According to the European Union, "Information is a deciding factor for consumers when making their choices and affects both consumer interests and their confidence in the products and services circulating within the market."

== Consumer expectation ==
The consumers expect to get fair treatment in the market place and avoid unscrupulous business dealings. They envisage a fair market environment that facilitates and supports several consumer rights:

- The consumer must get a fair chance of choosing from the range of goods and services available in the market place.
- The consumer must be provided with complete, unambiguous and explicit knowledge about the products. The information must contain details regarding the contents of the product, safety warnings and product care instructions.
- The information should be written in plain and understandable language, which is self-explanatory. Also, the text should be readable in terms of the size and type of font.
- The consumers expect just and equitable pricing of the products. Fair price is equal to a reasonable profit margin added to the real cost of manufacturing of product or service (with no exorbitant mark-up cost). Information about the related costs of the product must be brought to the knowledge of the consumer.
- The consumers also have the right to indiscriminate prices, that is paying the same price as other customers, without any discrimination.
- Consumers also expect to get a communication channel for inquiry and complaints about the product or service. They want effective redressal and remedies to loss, such as implementation of legal regulations and prosecution to law violations .

With the advent of electronic media in marketing, and the mass information storage capacity of computers, consumer privacy has become a great concern. Hence, consumers want to ensure privacy of information. The consumers want to be able to cast off the invasive marketing methods, and threat of entry into the private system of consumers.

== Importance ==
Consumer information is the most important element for consumer protection and policy decisions. It is the solution to issues ranging from online transactional threats, behavioural targeting, loss of privacy and other problems. A consumer should treat every purchase as an important investment. Making an uninformed investment in the stock market can result in huge financial losses and this same concept applies to daily purchases. Being an informed consumer is advantageous to the economy, market and consumers. An informed consumer is capable of making sensible decisions by gaining an insight about a product prior to its purchase. This insight equips the consumer with the data to arrive at an evidence based conclusion. This can be made clear through in a few common aspects:

- Appropriate quality – Almost every purchase comes with a variety of options from which to choose. Consumer information enables the customers to select a quality of product which matches their needs for durability or sustainability.
- Reliability – Information about products facilitates safe purchases. Mass production of bulk consumer goods may result in instances of products bearing manufacturing defects. Recognising these defects can prevent the customer from financial injury or loss. Product and brand reviews and consumer forums online can be instrumental in educating the customers about potential problems with the product, and should be considered when making big purchases like appliances and vehicles.
- Affordability – Consumers may be misled by aggressive sales tactics, especially by professionals paid by commission, who may entice the consumer to buy expensive products, products with a high mark-up, or expensive options. Information about the potential purchases can help the consumer save money and ensure a smarter purchase.
- Ethical considerations – Consumers may not wish to deal with a company which indulges in unethical practices, such as animal testing, labour abuse, environmental pollution, and political corruption.

It is the responsibility of the consumer to get all the information about the potential purchase and associated background before making a decision to buy a product. It is ultimately the consumer, through their market choices, which endorses or rejects a product, thus shaping the marketplace. Becoming educated about the consequences of a purchase makes the consumer both informed and responsible.

== Effects on marketplace ==
Providing complete information levels the information asymmetries between the producer and consumer and improves consumer decision-making. Transparent information about the terms and conditions associated with the product or service make plain the regulatory requirements to redress any consumer grievances. Informing the consumer can also help set the consumer's expectations of the product, which can be useful to the producer.

Some businesses may be reluctant to inform their potential consumers, concerned that this might harm the marketability and attractiveness of their products. However, economic analysis indicates that informational asymmetry between the producer and consumer is detrimental to the marketplace and a major ground for market failure – with consumers left to make irrational decisions. Unbiased information can help solve market problems by equipping the customers with appropriate information, ensuring healthy market practices.

== Sources of information ==
Consumers derive their information from multiple sources. The following are the sources from which consumers gather desired knowledge about the product:

- Governments issue public information for the consumers
- Regulatory authorities, review and testing services and comparison sites
- Social networks (friends, family, fellow consumers, etc.)
- Suppliers of the products or services.
- the media

Consumers derive information from a variety sources, each with its own interest, skills and resources. It is essential for the consumers to recognise their personal interests and make a suitable decision.

== Customer know-how ==
The US Federal Trade Commission recommends that consumers:

- Know who they are dealing with, and to not do business with any company that cannot be contacted.
- Protect personal information, and share it only with a trusted company.
- Resist high-pressure sales techniques, and take time to consider a purchase.
- Get all promises in writing and review all documents before paying or signing a contract.
- Discard any offer that asks payment for a gift.
- Know the risks when it comes to investment.

== Market shift ==
The abundance of available information via electronic media has created a transformation of the market orientation. While traditional customer engagement required teaching the consumer about the product or service, consumers have become knowledge-ridden with strong opinions on how they want to spend their money. This trend is substantiated by Forrester Research which found "buyers are often between 70 and 90 percent of the way through the sales process before they ever engage a vendor".

This evolution in the market orientation can be a challenge for existing and emerging businesses. Some ways of taking advantage of the new market are to understand the target customers, maintain visibility to these people, and utilize grassroots tactics.

To deal with informed consumers, the marketer must understand that the consumer has knowledge about the product and be prepared to manoeuvre this knowledge into a sale, and be well-informed to provide comprehensive knowledge to the consumers.

With the increase in the variety of sources for consumer education, it is important for the marketer to enter the sales process at an early stage. The marketer must move ahead of the curve and make sure to bring some value to the customer's purchase beyond just fulfilling his/her need.

== EU legislation ==
EU consumer policy is designed to:

- protect consumers against serious risks and threats that they cannot tackle on their own
- enable consumers to make choices based on clear, accurate and consistent information
- safeguard consumer rights, enabling consumers to resolve disputes with traders quickly and efficiently
- ensure consumers' rights keep pace with economic and social change – especially in the food, energy, financial, transport and digital markets.

In an efficient, integrated EU economy underpinned by EU-wide rules, consumers must be able to trust that their rights will be upheld in the event of any problems when purchasing goods and services in other EU countries. At an annual cost of 5 euro cents per person, the EU's consumer protection programme for 2014–2020 is designed to enforce consumer laws throughout the single market, giving consumers a high level of legal protection.

== Statistics ==
According to the 2013 Edelman Trust Barometer, an online survey of 26,000 general population respondents across 26 countries, 35% of those identified as "the informed public" who need to hear company information three times to believe it, while another 29% need to hear it an additional 4–5 times.

The study also looked at how consumers place their trust in corporations of different sizes. In the US, 86% of informed consumers trust small businesses, while just 55% trust big businesses. A similar gap is apparent in the UK (78% vs. 48%), but the opposite is true in China, where 89% trust big businesses compared to 65% for small businesses.

Whereas informed publics in developed countries are more trusting of small than big businesses (76% vs. 53%), emerging market respondents placed more trust in big businesses (79% vs. 70%). Overall, small businesses are slightly more trusted than big businesses (70% vs. 62%).

Looking at company types, the study finds that trust in media companies rose from 52% of informed publics globally in 2012 to 57% in 2013. Within the US, trust in media companies crossed into the majority, increasing from 45% to 51%.
