= Sustainable consumer behaviour =

Sub-discipline of consumer behavior

Sustainable consumer behavior is a sub-discipline of consumer behavior studying the impact of environmental awareness and sustainability goals on consumer choices. It studies the products that consumers select, how those products are used, and how they are disposed of in pursuit of consumers' sustainability goals. Sustainable consumer behavior seeks to understand all stages of the consumption process from a social, environmental, and marketing perspective.

From a conventional marketing perspective, consumer behavior has focused largely on the purchase stage of the total consumption process. This is because it is the point at which a contract is made between the buyer and seller, money is paid, and the ownership of products transfers to the consumer. Yet from a social and environmental perspective, consumer behavior needs to be understood as a whole since a product affects all stages of a consumption process.

== Consumer decision process ==
The buyer decision process or consumer decision process is described in three or five stages. The basic, three stage model of consumption describes obtaining, consuming, and disposing of products and services. The study of consumer decision making expands these into five stages, first described by John Dewey in 1910:

1. Problem recognition
2. Information search
3. Evaluation of alternatives
4. Purchase decision
5. Post purchase behavior

=== Problem recognition ===
Need and want recognition occur when a consumer senses a difference between what he or she perceives to be the ideal versus the actual state of affairs.

=== Information search ===
There are three key sources for searching information: personal, commercial, and public sources. Mass media, which is a public source, increasingly provides information about the environmental costs and benefits of consumption. Consumers become aware of such costs and benefits through these sources.

=== Evaluation of alternatives ===
In this stage, environmental concerns which are expressed as environmental costs, risks, and benefits, will contribute to the evaluation of options as the consumer decides what to buy. One way to evaluate more sustainable consumption is to consider the total customer cost which incurs in acquisition, use, and post-use phases.

=== Purchase decision ===
Consumers have to trade off the environmental benefits against other attributes such as price, performance, and design. In addition they may need to change their habitual manner of behavior.

=== Post purchase behavior ===
In this stage, maintenance, repair, use frequency, and type of use are of interest. For some key products such as homes, cars, and domestic appliances, much of the sustainability impact accrues after the purchase phase during use or post-use.

Post-purchase behavior may also include disposal where consumers can keep, reuse (for example by selling, trading, or giving a product to others), or dispose of a product. Some materials such as paper, glass, or metal can be recycled or reused in the production process. This phase has become important due to overloaded landfill communal waste disposal.

== Consumer behavior influence ==
Consumer choice contributes to the success of individual businesses, overall economic growth, supply and demand, and waste. A purchase provides revenue for a business that is used to purchase new supplies and products to provide sought after goods and services. The production and consumption process contribute to waste and pollution exacerbating environmental issues. Sustainable consumer behavior seeks to minimize the harm from the cascading effects of a single purchase.

Consumption is an economic phenomenon that addresses our individual wants and drives the economy through our collective behavior, a social and cultural process through which we express our identity and establish our place within society, and a physical process that consumes resources. The collective consequences of such consumption decisions are a principal driver behind climate change that will have consequences for people, countries, and species across the globe.

Consumers' purchasing behavior determines the success or failure of new products and services that are marketed on the basis of their sustainability performance. Because of the role of consumers in determining sustainability impacts during the use and disposal phases of the consumption process, their overall behavior also influences the sustainability performance of all goods and services.

== Attitude, knowledge and behavior gap ==
There exist some inconsistencies in consumers' behaviors.

=== Attitude and behavior gap ===
Despite the increase in consumers' environmental awareness, many have not changed their consumption choices and behaviors. This can be due to consumers' selfishness, because they don't want to give up or change the way they live, or because of the associated costs and taxes.

A survey was conducted in October 2020 by McKinsey & Company in ten countries (primarily in the U.S.) to determine the important factors individuals consider while deciding to purchase a product. Overall sustainability was not highly considered compared to price, quality, brand, and convenience; and since the COVID-19 pandemic, consumers have stronger preferences for product packaging in regards to food safety and hygiene. However, it was found that more than half of the U.S. consumers are concerned about the environmental impact of packaging and are willing to pay more for sustainable options. Additionally, consumers show interest in better availability and labeling for eco-friendly products as well as interest in both recyclable plastics and fiber-based alternatives.

More recent findings from the 2023 Buying Green Report indicate a significant shift in consumer behavior toward sustainable packaging.The report reveals that 82% of consumers across various age groups are willing to pay more for products in sustainable packaging, marking an increase from previous years. Notably, 90% of Gen-Z consumers express this willingness, highlighting a strong preference among younger demographics.Additionally, 71% of consumers have chosen a product in the past six months based on its sustainability credentials, and 80% are interested in purchasing products with refillable packaging to reduce environmental impact.These trends point to a growing consumer demand for eco-friendly packaging options, even amidst rising prices.

=== Knowledge and behavior gap ===
There is a discrepancy between what behavior consumers think is socially and environmentally sustainable and what their behavior actually is. For instance, many people in the U.S. limit their use of spray cans as they want to minimize their contribution to the impact on the ozone layer. Their behavior is not environmentally significant because the substances that affect the ozone layer were phased out in the U.S. in 1996. Consumers' lack knowledge about the environmental impacts of consumption.

In the same survey 60–70% of people reported to be willing to pay more for sustainability and 35–36% would buy sustainable products if these products were available and better labeled as such. These results demonstrate a knowledge gap that prevents people from making the best choices. Consumers rely on perception and may make ignorant decisions. For example, cereal in a cardboard box is considered to be more environmentally friendly than cereal in a bag, even though the bag contains less packaging (as the box also contains a bag inside). The outward appearance of the recyclable cardboard masks the plastic inside.

Behaviors can impact consumption despite knowledge. In some cases, this discrepancy can contribute to the rebound effect – where consumers believe that they made environmentally sustainable choices, leading to increased overall consumption or usage. For instance, a study of 285 cities in China found that improvements in digital development efficiency and sustainability led to a rebound effect, increasing electricity consumption by approximately 7%–20%.

== Three theories of explanation ==
=== Rational explanations ===
These theories emphasize the economics of sustainable consumption, and how consumers weigh up the functional benefits and relatively affordability of a product and service. Behavioral models based around economical rationality tend to assume a high degree of self-interest on the part of the consumer.

=== Psychological explanations ===
Research into the psychology of sustainable consumption, and of the more emotional and irrational explanations of our behavior, focuses on consumers` attitudes and beliefs about sustainable issues. Three important sets of attitudes that influence consumers willingness to engage with sustainability issues are perceived personal relevance, social responsibility, and sustainability

=== Sociological explanations ===
Consumer behavior is also explained by how we think our consumption activities will be perceived by others, and how that might be reflect and influence our place in society. Not only this, but culture plays a significant role in shaping our everyday consumption habits and our attitudes towards environmental sustainability. Culture shapes social norms and beliefs about consumption and the subsequent consequences of our actions.

== Forms ==
Sustainable consumption is not simply a question of what products and services are purchased, but is also about the adoption of a lifestyle in which sustainability is reflected in all aspects of consumers' behavior. Voluntary simplifiers' lifestyle is based around five key values:

=== Material simplicity ===
This involves consuming fewer products and services, and tending to seek out products that are resource efficient, durable, and with a reduced ecological impact.

=== Human scale ===
Following the principle of "small is beautiful" this favors working and living environments that are smaller, simpler and less centralized.

=== Self-determination ===
This means to meet one's needs, or even to influence what those needs might be, through a reduced reliance on large commercial businesses, or even large public-sector organizations.

=== Ecological awareness ===
People can change their behavior through marketing campaigns to encourage recycling and reducing CO_{2} emissions and the adoption of conservation of resources and reduction of waste in order to protect the environment.

=== Personal growth ===
This emphasizes satisfaction through experiences and development of personal abilities instead of through commercially provided consumption experiences.

Many of the key traits of voluntary simplification have been exhibited in a less extreme, but more widespread way, through the phenomenon of "downshifting." Downshifting involves a change of lifestyle and consumption patterns that exchange a relatively highly paid/lower stress but more rewarding, and shifting to a lower level of material consumption but a higher level of quality of life and personal satisfaction.

== Sustainable consumption choices ==
All types of consumption are not equally important in terms of their sustainability impacts. The European Environmental Impact of Product Project provides a rigorous analysis of research into the environmental impact of products consumed by households. The project's input/output-based methodology assesses 255 domestic product types against a wide range of environmental impacts. It concludes that 70–80% of total impacts relate to food and drink consumption; housing (including domestic energy use); and transport (including commuting, leisure, and holiday travel). Additionally, plastics pollution is a growing issue as they can be found in 40 percent of the world's ocean surfaces and contain 15–51 trillion pieces of plastics according to studies. Ideally, all aspects of our consumption behaviors and production systems will become oriented toward sustainability, but significant progress would be achieved through the following:

- Sustainable food and drink consumption choices—Consumption level that are more conducive to health; a reduced consumption of meat products due to their contribution to climate change; choosing organically produced and locally sourced, seasoned produce; and greater composting of biodegradable food waste
- Sustainable housing consumption choices—More emphasis on purchasing homes constructed using sustainable materials and choosing and creating homes with high levels of insulation and energy efficiency. This also involves energy usage within the home based on sustainable energy source, and the avoidance of energy waste while living in the home (e.g. through energy-efficient refrigerators and energy saving bulbs).
- Sustainable travel behavior—Reducing the amount of travel (e.g. through home-working or teleconference service) or finding alternative transport means for journeys, such as cycling for leisure rather than driving. Seeking tourism offerings that try to protect the global and local environment and also the cultures within tourism destinations.
- Sustainable fashion choices – Opting for clothing made from organic, recycled, or sustainably sourced materials, supporting brands with ethical production practices, and prioritizing durability over fast fashion. Repairing and reusing clothing, as well as donating or recycling garments, also contributes to reducing waste in the fashion industry.
- Sustainable everyday items – Carry reusable water bottles, coffee cups, and shopping bags to avoid single-use plastics. Switching to reusable containers and avoiding plastic straws, cutlery, and packaging can significantly cut down on plastic waste. This reduces environmental harm and conserves resources, contributing to a more sustainable daily routine.

== Sustainable choices and motivational imbalance ==
Individuals may experience motivational imbalance in which they believe a particular choice has positive personal outcomes but is subject to disapproval by important social referents or that the choice does not comply with their moral standards. Motivational imbalance can generate further ramifications on consumer sustainable choices.

== Toward behavior change ==
Behavior change in consumption is a guiding principle for sustainable development policy. However, switching unsustainable consumer behaviors to sustainable ones is far from straightforward. Individual behaviors are rooted in social and institutional contexts. We are influenced by what others around us say and do and by institutional rules. We have been already locked into unsustainable behaviors regardless of our intentions.

Sustainable consumption choices are influenced by habit and routine. Habits can be thought of as procedural strategies to reduce the cognitive effort associated with making choices, particularly in situations that are relatively stable. They allow us to perform routine actions with a minimum of deliberation and often only limited awareness. Evidence suggests that habit is a crucial component in a wide variety of environmentally-significant activities: travel behavior, shopping patterns, household chores, waste disposal, leisure activities, and even personal hygiene. Habits are formed through repetition and reinforcement.

Andersen (1982) identifies three stages in the formation of a new habit:

1. The declarative stage involves information processing relating to a particular choice or action. At this stage the attitudinal and affective responses to this information are both important. The information challenges the existing choice, but at this stage does not actually change (e.g.) coffee-buying behavior.
2. In the knowledge compilation stage, however, this information is converted into a new routine by exercising a different choice in practice.
3. When the action itself is associated with a clear positive reinforcement, and repeated over time, a "cognitive script" is developed which enables one to repeat the same action in similar circumstances with very little cognitive effort. This final procedural stage locks into a new habit. At this stage, the behavior is more or less automatized and bypasses rational deliberation almost completely.

In many cases, people appear to be locked into behaviors and behavioral patterns that resist change. In fact, they change continually and sometimes radically in a short period. The uptake of smart phones, widescreen plasma TVs, standby modes in electronic appliances, patterns of holiday travel and travel behavior: these are examples of technological and behavioral change that have occurred in only a decade. These sorts of changes are a kind of "creeping evolution" of social and technological norms. Individuals alter their behaviors and sometimes individual behavior initiates new social trends. At some level, individuals find themselves responding to societal and technological changes that are initiated elsewhere. Policies to encourage pro-environmental and pro-social consumer behaviors can be informed by understanding of the dimensions of and possibilities for behavioral change.

Consumption is a holistic process, part of a broader consumer lifestyle, that is strongly influenced by the social context in which it takes place. Individual changes in purchasing behavior can contribute to progress toward sustainability, but progress also depends on supports from deeper changes occurring within consumer lifestyle and throughout society.

There are now many media that support consumers in making their lifestyles more sustainable.

== See also ==
- Consumer behavior
- Sustainability
- Sustainable development
- Sustainability marketing
- Sustainable transport
- Efficient energy use
- Environmental impact
- Behavioral pattern
