= Sustainability brand =

Potentially sustainable brand

Sustainability brands are brands that undertake sustainable practises in the workings of their business and champion them.

They then use brand communication tools to convey these benefits to their end consumer, hence enabling then to make conscious decisions while being associated with or buying from that brand.There are several techniques to communicate this.

It is imperative that a sustainable brand has truly integrated its claims in its business plan and corororate practices. If not done correctly, greenwashing is a serious violation and risk to the company's reputation.

Critics of the practice suggest the rise of greenwashing, paired with ineffective regulation, contributes to consumer scepticism of all green claims and diminishes the power of the consumer to drive companies toward greener manufacturing processes and business operations. Many corporations use greenwashing to improve public perception of their brands. Complex corporate structures often obscure the big picture.

== Overview ==
Sustainability branding is the process of creating and maintaining an identity of a specific product, service, or business that reflects special added value in terms of environmental and social benefits. A brand is only perceived as being sustainable if it can credibly convey sustainability benefits which are noticeable by and relevant to the consumer. A sustainability brand must have an integrated culture for success. The key to a sustainable brand is trust between the consumer and the brand; only when this is achieved can a sustainable brand truly generate a USP and reap the benefits of it.

Opposed to the term green brands which mainly focuses on environmentally sound business practices, sustainability brands additionally acknowledge the social dimension of prviding products and services. This entails, among others, health and safety issues resulting from direct or indirect product use (consumption level) as well as the conditions under which a particular product is produced (production level). The physical protection and well-being of people at work (i.e. employees as well as workers within the supply chains) are important indicators of sustainabilileands and sustainability marketing in general which adheres to the triple bottom line of ecological (environmental), social (equity), and financial (economic) sustainability.

A brand can evoke positive or negative feelings, particularly in the context of sensitive social and ecological issues. More positive perceptions and feelings towards a brand increase the likelihood of consumer identification and loyalty. Building strong brands is therefore an important aspect of sustainability marketing. In doing so, companies face decisions concerning brand positioning, sustainability brand name selection, and brand development, with the aim of creating brands that consumers associate with social and environmental added value.

Environmental marketing claims on products and packages need to be made (and read) with caution. Ambiguous greenwashing titles such as green product, green packaging and environmentally friendly can be confusing without specific definition. Some regulators, such as the US Federal Trade Commission, are providing guidance

== Sustainability brands vs. sustainable brands ==
Since the adjective "sustainable" might convey the notion of brands that have long-lasting success, implicating durable competitive advantage without any particular reference to a sustainability agenda, the term "sustainability brand" should be used to prevent ambiguity. Although a subtle difference, the latter explicitly emphasizes the notion of brands which have built their brand image upon sustainable business practices that consumers value. Sustainability brands are commonly referred to in the field of sustainability marketing.

== Sustainability brand positioning and the 8 C's ==
Sustainability brand positioning and positioning in general is part of the brand identity and value proposition that is to be actively communicated to the target audience and can be described as an iterative process, consisting of deliberate and proactive actions aimed at the definition of distinct consumer perceptions. Sustainable brand positioning is the brand positioning of Sustainable products and services. Sustainable products and services should offer an improved social and ecological performance during the whole product lifecycle and at the same time they have to satisfy consumer needs and wants. Many of the first-generation sustainability brands failed in the market because companies overemphasized the positive socio-ecological product attributes, while they neglected to focus on other product attributes such as performance, functionality, or design, too. As a result, many products could not compete against conventional products.

To build up and position strong sustainability brands, there are some guidelines to follow. Marc Stoiber summed them up in The five Cs of Sustainability Branding: Consumer Facing, Competitive, Core, Conversational and Credible. Perrine Bouhana added to that concept “a sixth C”: Consistency. Martin Belz complemented and revised this concept to “8 C’s” of sustainability branding and describesdthem as:

=== Core ===
Sustainability should be tied up to the key problems and the core business through assessing the socio-ecological impacts of products along the entire life-cycle of the products and finding out the socio-ecological "hot spots" of the product life cycle.

=== Co-operative ===
The solutions to the main socio-ecological problems associated with products along the entire life cycle require - both in the process of innovating and marketing sustainable products and services - co-operations with suppliers, retailers, consumers, scientists, and other non-market actors (e.g. NGO’s).

=== Credible ===
Fundamentals of credibility are first the solving of key socio-ecological problems associated with companies’ products and second tying sustainability to the core business. Co-operations with trustworthy partners and the use of independent, third-party labels (e.g. labels like Bio or MSC) such as a high level of transparency (e.g. through an online tracking system, which enables consumers to see the world of behind the product) can additionally increase the credibility of sustainability brands.

=== Consumer benefits ===
Socio-ecological characteristics or attributes of products usually just play an auxiliary role (no core benefits). To broaden the appeal of sustainability brands, the companies should emphasize the inherent consumer benefits of socio-ecological attributes, including efficiency and cost effectiveness, health and safety, symbolism and status. Further they should align socio-ecological attributes with benefits such as functionality, design, and durability to create “motive alliances”.

=== Conversational ===
Sustainability branding is more effective as a two-way conversation, rather than a one-way announcement. Inviting consumers to enter into dialogues about the sustainability process strengthens the brand-consumer relationship.

=== Consistency ===
If sustainability is key to brand positioning, this requires a kind of integrated approach to sustainability communication: it is important to communicate in a consistent way, including e.g. advertising, personal selling or online communication. In addition to that, the sustainability product brand has to be consistent with the overall environmental and social performance of the company.

=== Commitment ===
Sustainability branding not only requires the commitment of the PR department and the sustainability officers but also requires the commitment of top management and marketing decision makers.

=== Continuity ===
Sustainability must reflect the core values of the brand and contribute to delivering the brand promise over the long term. This means that a brand cannot change its sustainability focus too often, or engage in too many non-related areas.

== Sustainability brand name selection ==
In the course of choosing the right name, Sustainability brands must first –just like brand names in the conventional sense- follow well-established rules. In general, a good brand name should consider three areas: memorability (distinctive short name, evoking emotions...), strategic fit (they should relate to the actual product; ability to expand to other brands) and legal (legal protection under trade mark law etc.).

Sustainability Brands however go one step further and incorporate something that conveys the notion of social and/or ecological awareness.

A popular example is Better Place, a global provider of electric vehicle networks and services that works in a joint venture with Renault Nissan Alliance Motor Company to promote the use of electric cars. Its founder, Shai Agassi, was intrigued by a question posed at the World Economic Forum in 2005: "How do you make the world a better place by 2020?" Thus the name Better Place. It is not related to the product (electric vehicle) but to much wider social and ecological issues (depletion of natural resources, CO_{2} emissions...), which the company addresses or rather offers the solution for.

Sustainability brand names can be part of a new product launch, an extension to an existing (conventional) brand or be so new to the market that they create a product category themselves. Each of these approaches has specific strategic implications.

=== Enter established market ===
Entering a saturated market such as the one for conventional household detergents with a sustainability brand might prove extremely difficult. However, there are companies that have successfully entered the market and positioned their brand as sustainability leaders. Seventh Generation, for instance, is the US market leader in four product categories (household, laundry, personal and baby care) with products that –in the words of the company- “protect human health and the environment.”

=== Brand extension / aligning existing brand ===
Established brands can leverage their existing brand recognition to extend their name to new products, which are then marketed as socially and ecologically friendly. Tide, a popular detergent brand in the US, expanded its brand to meet the demands of the ecological conscious consumer by launching Tide Cold Water Detergent in 2005. The product requires only cold water and thus saves energy. In 2010, it was given the Green GH seal, which is only awarded after a “cradle to grave” examination of the product.

=== Creating entirely new product categories ===
Sustainability brand names can also succeed if they achieve to create a product category for themselves where there is virtually no competition yet. When the car-sharing concept was fairly new, companies such as Mobility CarSharing in Switzerland did neither compete with car companies nor public transportation providers.

== Sustainability brand development ==
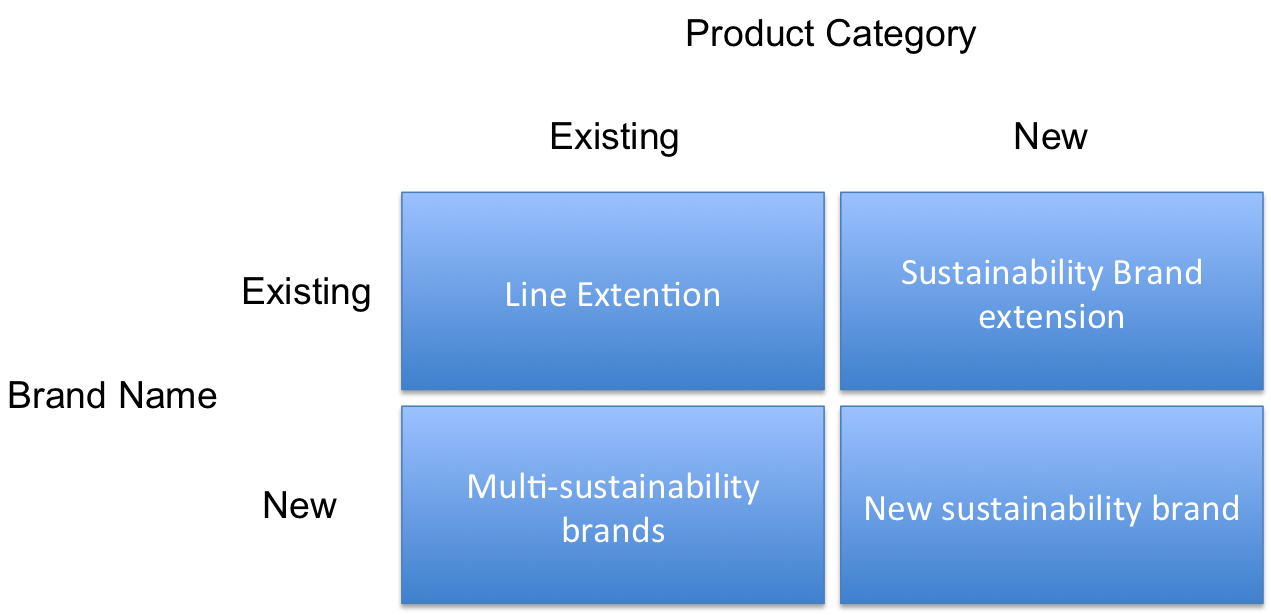
Sustainability brand development

Sustainability brands are subject to constant change. A sustainability brand that is well established on the market, can be further developed into different directions. According to Belz and Peattie, four main options for development are possible:

- Line extension occurs when a company adds new products of the same product category under the same sustainability brand name.
- Sustainability brand extension occurs when a company introduces products of a different product category but under the same sustainability brand name.
- Multi-sustainability brands occur when a company manages two or more different sustainability brands but in the same product category.
- New sustainability brands occur when a company creates an entire new brand name when they access a new product category (for example, MUD Jeans).

To create a sustainability brand, channels for marketing are selected according to Lauterborn's five Cs. Advertising can create awareness of the brand and form the brand experience.

It is obligatory for sustainability brands to obtain one or more ecolabels, leading to a higher influence on consumer behaviour and the perception of the brand.

== Sustainable brands vs. false advertising ==
With promises of sustainable and ethical practices in the fashion industry on a rise, businesses attempt to market according to these requests. An issue that is accompanied by this is that of companies greenwashing their values to bring in more consumers who believe they are supporting a good cause. Companies like H&M and Zara have been called out by the Norwegian Consumer Council for failing to provide genuine information on why their brands are eco-friendly, thus leading to false marketing claims. Due to differing perspectives and interpretations of what it means to be sustainable, it can be troublesome to regulate honest sustainable practices.

== See also ==
- Ecological economics
- Ecologically sustainable development
- Environmentally friendly
- Sustainable packaging
