= Environmental certification =

Form of environmental regulation and development

Environmental certification is a form of environmental regulation and development where a company can voluntarily choose to comply with predefined processes or objectives set forth by the certification service. Most certification services have a logo (commonly known as an ecolabel) which can be applied to products certified under their standards. This is seen as a form of corporate social responsibility allowing companies to address their obligation to minimise the harmful impacts to the environment by voluntarily following a set of externally set and measured objectives.

== Motivations for implementation ==
The primary motivations for many companies who choose to implement environmental certification schemes are, to provide an ethical product for the consumers, increase sustainable development, improve the image of the company, gain a better relationship with stakeholders and to make a higher profit.

Many companies believe that the implementation of environmental certification programmes can lead to an improved company image and generate competitive advantage. This is usually achieved through the use of ecolabels which can be used on the company's products, allowing the product to stand out as being produced in an environmentally sound way. The ecolabels associated with environmental certification inform consumers that the product in question has been verified by a third party auditor as originating from an environmentally well managed company. Therefore, the certificate gives an indication of good practice and provides the company a better image. This approach allows consumers to steer their purchasing behaviour in a more environmentally sound direction. This also means that if environmental marketing strategies such as environmental certification are to work there must be consumers willing to purchase the resulting green products.

There are also ethical motivations for a company to improve its environmental performance and move towards achieving sustainable development. All environmental certification schemes attempt to provide organisations with an effective environmental management system to help them to achieve environmental and economic goals. The current high levels of consumption and economic growth often leads to the degradation of land and pollution of the natural environment. The aim of the move towards sustainable development is to ensure the availability of natural resources for future generations. Within environmental certification the life cycle approach is often adopted, where the life cycle of the product from its production to its disposal are followed to ensure that it is produced, used and disposed of in a sustainable and environmentally sound way.

There is increasing pressure on companies to respond to environmental pressure from stakeholders, therefore increasing the use of voluntary environmental regulations such as certification to achieve sufficient social legitimacy and to protect their profits. This is a relational motivation as the company feels that environmentally conscious management will help to prevent stakeholder pressures and to form a good relationship with the socio-economic environment. There are also operational motivations which are the belief that environmental certification can help to reduce costs and increase productivity and commercial motivations which are the belief that it can help to increase sales and improve the market position.

There are examples of private sector companies choosing to promote private standards over international standards for certification. The motivation is new terms can be created that will improve their environmental reporting. The term 'insetting' was created by the private sector, and is not a term defined in the international standard, IWA 42 Net Zero Guidelines. The New Climate Institute (NCI) reported companies were successfully lobbying the standards setting organizations (SSOs) to rubber-stamp the inclusion of 'insetting claims' that benefit their net zero pledges.

== Examples ==
=== EU Organic Label ===
The EU Organic Label

The European Union Organic Label provides a visual identification to organic products produced in the European Union. The label is based on the form of a symbolic green leaf together with the 12 stars of the Flag of European Union. It can be found on a number of food and drink products including wines. It stems from the European Union regulation that sets rules about the production of organic agricultural and livestock products and how to label them. These rules are based on principles of environmental protection, such as enhancing the life of the soil, its natural fertility and water retention capacity, and the preservation and enhancement of biodiversity. Such labelling builds trust for consumers and makes it easier for people identify organic products. It also helps farmers and distributors market these products across the EU.

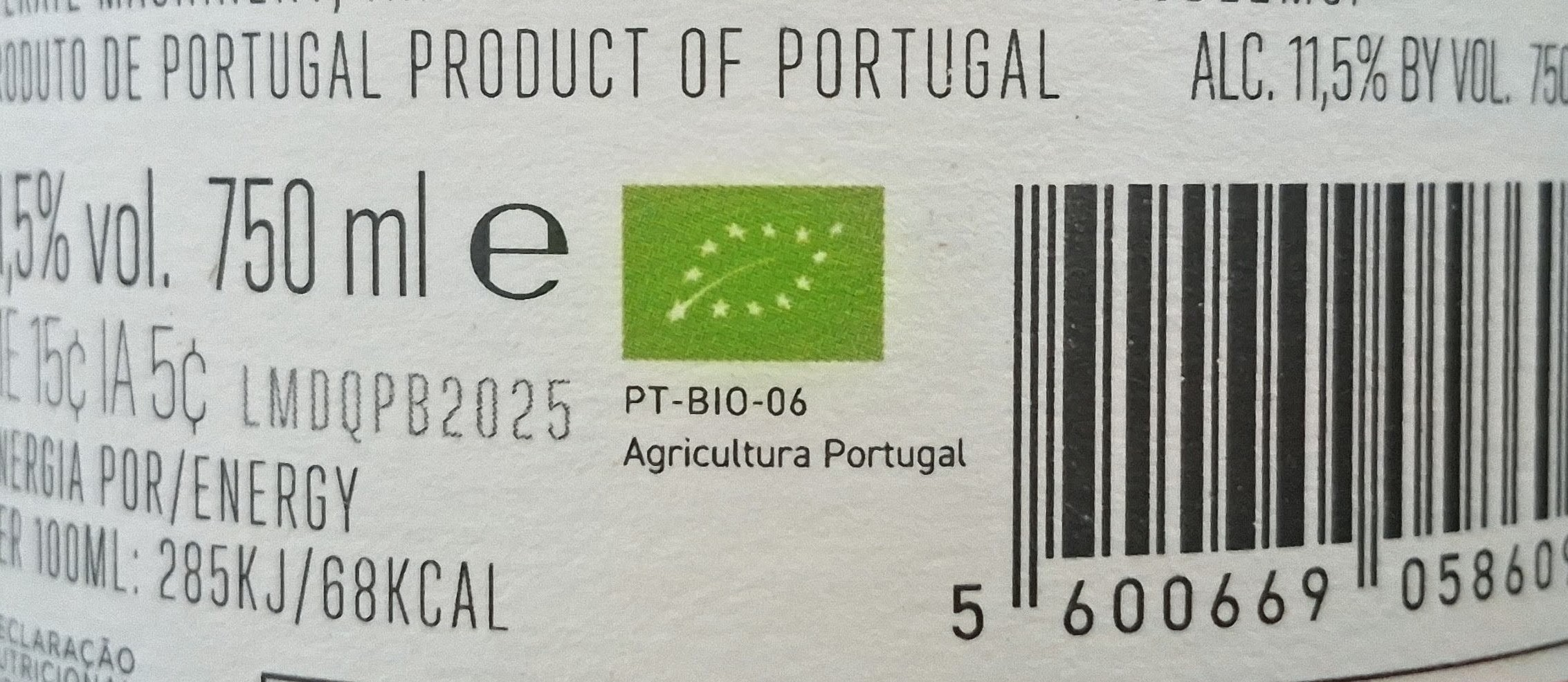
Example of the EU organic label on a bottle of wine

The EU organic label can only be used on products that have been certified as organic by an authorised control agency or body. This means that they have fulfilled strict conditions on how they must be produced, processed, transported and stored. The label can only be used on products when they contain at least 95% organic ingredients and additionally, respect further strict conditions for the remaining 5%. To apply for the EU organic label, producers must follow a formal application process that includes submitting documentation and undergoing inspections.

=== Carbon Trust Standard ===
Example of Carbon emission label issued by Carbon Trust.

The Carbon Trust Standard is an independent certification scheme from The Carbon Trust, certifying an organisation's impact in respect of:

- Energy usage and greenhouse gas (CO2e) emissions
- Water usage, management and effluent
- Waste management and disposal.

Its stated aim is to recognize best practice and real achievements in reduction, to help organisations to measure, manage and reduce their environmental impact, whilst improving their resource management and operational sustainability. The certification process aims to identify inefficiencies in resource use and to provide a framework for improving management processes, reducing waste and costs. As of July 2014, over 1,100 organisations have certified with the Carbon Trust Standard.

=== EMAS ===
The Eco-Management and Audit Scheme (EMAS) is the EU's voluntary environmental resources management instrument. Environmental Management Systems in accordance with EMAS are used worldwide by companies and organisations of all sizes and types. EMAS registered organisations commit themselves to evaluate, manage and improve their environmental performance.

EMAS is open to every type of organisation attempting to improve its environmental performance. It spans all economic and service sectors and is applicable worldwide. Currently, more than 4,400 organisations and more than 8,150 sites are EMAS registered. Only independent environmental verifiers that are accredited/licensed and supervised by government authorities (Accreditation or Licensing Bodies) are authorised to validate EMAS environmental statements. The external and independent nature of the EMAS registration process ensures the credibility of the scheme and the reliability of the information provided by registered organisations. The ISO 14001: 2004 requirements are a part of EMAS, but EMAS adds several elements to these:

- stricter requirements on the measurement and evaluation of environmental performance against set targets according to six environmental core indicators, and the continuous improvement of that environmental performance;
- compliance with environmental legislation ensured by government supervision: the compliance check is executed by an independent and external environmental verifier, who is in turn subjected to quality checks by national government authorities (EMAS Competent Bodies, EMAS Accreditation Bodies);
- requirement of employee involvement in the continuous performance improvement process;
- provision of information to the general public through the obligation to publish an annual public environmental statement that is independently verified;
- registration by a public authority after verification by an accredited/licensed environmental verifier; and
- registered organisations can use the EMAS logo to communicate their EMAS compliance

More than 80 percent of all EMAS registered organizations are small and medium-sized organisations (SMEs). EMAS has specific provisions in place to facilitate EMAS registration for SMEs. For example, EMASeasy, a lean and standardised methodology, has been developed to facilitate the participation of small and micro businesses in the EMAS Scheme.

=== Forest Stewardship Council (FSC) ===
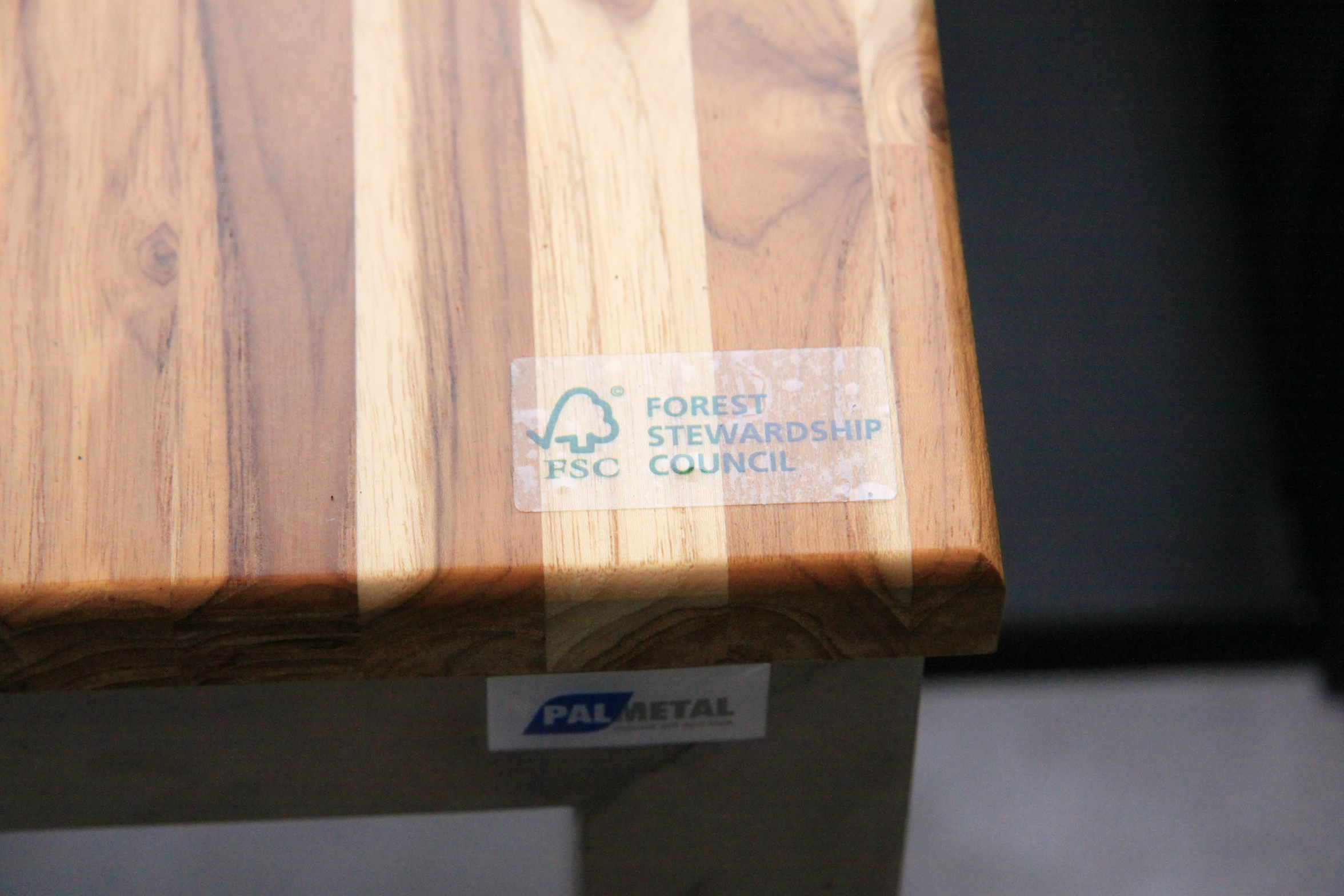
Example of Forest Stewardship Council (FSC) label.

The Forest Stewardship Council (FSC) is a non-profit, nongovernmental organization (NGO) which promotes the responsible management of forests on an international scale. It is widely regarded as one of the most important initiatives for promoting responsible international forest management and was established in 1993 following concerns for global deforestation. The FSC is a voluntary mechanism which involves an inspection of a forest landowners management practices based on criteria for sustainable forest management. This can occur on both privately and publicly owned forests and allows the products manufactured from certified forests to be tracked through the value chain. Certificates are not issued by the FSC but by third party independent organisations called certification bodies. These bodies assess the forest management against FSC standards and audits certificate holders at least once a year to ensure continued compliance with FSC standards. To achieve official recognition as an FSC certification body they must comply with a large set of rules and procedures and also be verified by Accreditation Services International (ASI), the company managing the FSC accreditation program.

The FSC provides a globally recognized technical standard and accreditation services for companies, organizations and communities engaging in responsible forestry. Products that have been certified can be identified by consumers from the product ecolabel which provides a trusted mark of forest products that benefit people and the environment. FSC certification enables companies to engage in a market, raising the recognition and value of forests to improve environmental and social practices. It has been supported by the World Bank, USAID, several European governments, environmental organizations, and by transnational retailers such as IKEA and The Home Depot. It has especially strong market penetration in the United Kingdom, Germany and on the Dutch timber market.

The fundamental purpose of the FSC is to allow environmentally aware consumers to use market forces to effectively complement and develop forest policy and to ensure that producer behave in a responsible way according to predefined objectives. As a result of this the FSC has been endorsed by influential NGOs as a means to promote concrete actions regarding forest management, as a platform for stating forest policy principles and values, and as an effective way to gain publicity. The potential benefits of the FSC are said to include ecological, economic and social aspects, therefore the sustainability of forests. The environmental certification process commits forest managers to make improvements to planning and monitoring, implement conservation strategies, reduce the environmental impact from logging and improve the conditions of forest workers. It also demonstrates the success of NGOs in promoting rapid adoption of environmental certification which pushes social and environmental improvements in forest management practices.

There have been concerns that the retailer-focused expansion strategy tends to favour large forest enterprises over small ones, northern operations over southern ones, and may be unable to meet the special needs of community forest managers. There has also been a concern that the certification process leaves the burden of costs of both the certification process and wood that is more expensive to produce on the producer without allowing them to charge a higher price for FSC certified products.

=== ISO 14001 ===
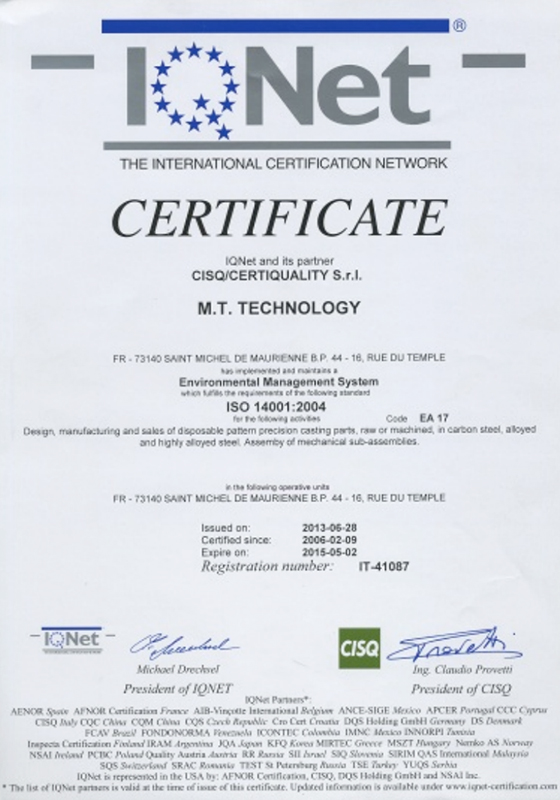
Example of ISO 14001 certificate.

The ISO 14001 is a voluntary international standard created in 1996 by the International Organization for Standardization (ISO) and forms part of the ISO 14000 series of environmental standards. This came about as a result of the Uruguay round of the GATT negotiations and the Rio Summit on the Environment held in 1992. At the Uruguay round of the GATT negotiations the need to reduce the non-tariff barriers to trade were discussed whereas at the Rio Summit the commitment to protect the environment at an international scale was argued. This brought about the ISO 14001 which allows firms to inform stakeholders of the implementation of an Environmental Management System (EMS) and specifies the actual requirements for an EMS. The ISO 14001 standard defines EMS as "the general part of management that includes the organizational structure, the activity planning, the responsibilities, the practices, the procedures, the processes and the resources to develop, implement, carry out, and revise the environmental policy and keep it up to date".

Similarly to the FSC, ISO 14001 certification can be issued by any third party certification body, but to prove credibility, such bodies should be accredited (to offer ISO 14001 certification) by organisations such as JAS-ANZ, ANAB, UKAS, and others. These accreditation bodies audit the certification bodies to ensure that the assessment and certification processes are robust and free from conflicts of interest. It provides guidelines and suggestions for matters such as environmental management, environmental auditing, and environmental labelling or lifecycle assessment. It applies to all organisations large or small and covers all sectors if there are environmental aspects that the organisation can control and influence in a positive way. There are other environmental management system standards that, while addressing the requirements of ISO 14001, have other additional benefits. For example, the Eco Warranty standard not only meets the requirements of ISO 14001 but also allows use of the certification logo; this is not allowable with accredited ISO 14001 certification.

The implementation of an EMS can be an appropriate step for those companies wanting to move towards a more environmentally aware position. It shows companies how to measure their consumption and reduce waste, also how they can effectively reduce, re-use and recycle to make savings costs, reduce environmental impacts and enhance their environmental credentials. Many organisations that choose to adopt the ISO 14001 are trying to achieve preferred supplier status as it is now often a competitive advantage or a requirement for local authorities or for a supply chain. The benefits of having ISO 14001 certification are seen to be, better management of environmental risks, both now and in the future, increased access to new customers and business partners, demonstration of legal and regulatory compliance, potential for reduced public liability insurance costs and overall cost savings through the reduction of consumption and waste and through recycling. Although this does not guarantee a specific level of improvement in environmental performance there is empirical evidence to suggest that this standard does help to improve the environmental performance of an organisation.

In paper from Environmental Coalition on Standards (ECOS) it explains the "ISO 2030 Strategy does make commitments on inclusiveness that, if implemented ambitiously, will make ISO the front-runner in inclusiveness, both for the standards they develop and their governance."

=== MCERTS ===
Business emissions into air, land and water are regulated under strict European and UK laws, to protect the environment and human health. If a company in England or Wales needs to comply with these laws it will need a permission from the Environment Agency to operate. This permission usually comes in the form of a permit, which usually requires it to monitor its emissions.

Businesses either monitor their emissions all the time, known as continuous monitoring, or at times defined in their permit, known as spot tests or periodic monitoring. In both cases they must meet EA quality requirements.

MCERTS is the Environment Agency's Monitoring Certification Scheme. It provides the framework for businesses to meet EA quality requirements. If it complies with MCERTS then the EA can have confidence in the monitoring of emissions to the environment.

MCERTS is used to approve instruments, people, laboratories and Environmental Data Management Systems (EDMS).

=== Blue Planet Friendly certification ===
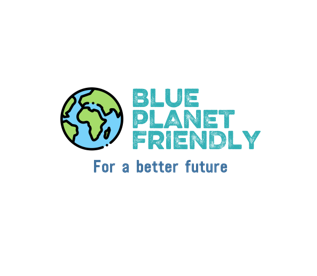
Blue Planet Friendly certification

Blue Planet Friendly is an environmental certification delivered by a French non-profit organization that serves a global movement for assessing and reducing the pollution generated by companies and cities.

The companies and cities certified prove emission reductions by product or inhabitant on a year basis and receive a certification with a level (bronze, silver or gold). Each company or city is physically audited every year.

== Effects ==
=== Positive ===
The most obvious benefit of environmental certification is that it is used as in instrument to allow actors to make important improvements to the way the environment is managed and in achieving sustainable development. They are usually used as an indicator of the environmental commitment of the organisation thus allowing the organisations involved to have the advantages attributed to environmental proactivity such as gaining a competitive advantage or environmental productivity. Therefore, the environmental certification generally satisfies the ethical and competitive expectations that lead the company to initiate the certification process. The general scope of the certification process can be looked at by the size of the area that is influenced, either directly or through demonstration of spill-over effects. For example, the FSC since it was established in 1993 has overseen the certification of forests in sixty countries, totalling nearly 50 million ha, and equivalent to perhaps 1.5 percent of the world's total forest area, thus making it a large and inclusive certification process with a wide scope. The benefit of environmental certification for consumers is that they can purchase products with the knowledge of the company's environmental standards and procedures, therefore giving the general public the option to consume in an ethical way. As a result of the ethical production, consumers may be willing to pay an additional price as a way of promoting and sustaining ethical production.

Certification has become a differentiating factor that is valued by industrial and financial markets, partly due to its recognition by influential companies in some industries. As a result of this, certification can act as a catalyst for competitive advantage and lead to economic benefits for producers through more efficient production systems, easier market access and price premiums.

Environmental certification is most likely to benefit companies that already have an environmental management system, even if the environmental variable is not effectively integrated into the overall process of strategic planning, and firms that are introducing and/or modifying it, or have to develop it in order to respond to the expected evolution of the external context. It may help them to organise or reorganise a well structured environmental system which will enable them to establish and access the effectiveness of existing operating procedures, achieve conformance with them and demonstrate conformance to external actors. Therefore, environmental certification may help these firms to reduce expenses and efforts and develop autonomously an environmental management system which will help them to improve their green image. Certification can also be used by actors in a commodity network to validate their activities. Therefore, the ethical environmental values linked to environmental certification can be tracked at all stages along the commodity network from the producer to the retailer.

=== Negative ===
There are various negative aspects associated with environmental certification one of which is the perception from markets that it is a reactive rather than a proactive investment, meaning that the certification as a standard is initiated as a response to institutional pressure rather than a self-regulation standard showing a desire to move towards a more environmentally sound system. Usually only the best performing operators become certified and approaches operating at the management level cannot always properly address concerns about biodiversity. Also tropical deforestation is usually a result of conversion of land from forest to other land uses, leaving it outside the influence of forest management certification.

At an organisational level, firms with no environmental management system and no interest in introducing one will have little incentive to join an environmental certification scheme, therefore leaving any environmental areas affected by these companies unprotected and liable to degradation. Also if the customer base of the company is not prepared to pay extra for environmentally friendly product there can be no incentive for a company to implement environmental certification.

The implementation of environmental certification is expensive, the burden of which is usually felt by the supplier rather than the retailer who must pay for the certification fees and the increased cost of production. In many cases the profit a supplier can expect to gain for their product does not compensate for the implementation cost. Many certification costs are fixed therefore large produces gain an advantage on their smaller competitors through economies of scale.

The use of forest certification can marginalise small and community forest managers as the costs are shifted onto them without any means for them to make the money back. Therefore, forest certification tends to be most prevalent in extensive and well documented forests in the global north rather than small or community forests in the global south where they would be more likely to gain more significant benefits. The dominance of eco-labelling markets in western developed economies may result in smaller producers and suppliers finding it increasingly difficult to enter the market without environmental certification. As a result of this it has been argued that certification is a means of changing the actions of producers in the global south to serve the interests and alleviate some of the anxieties of consumers in the global north.

Currently consumption is central to economic and human development therefore many of the efforts to minimise the threats that consumption poses to the environment and the sustainability of the worlds resources have focused on reducing the impact of producing the goods and services rather than addressing and trying to reduce the level of consumption. This is true for environmental certification as this primarily focuses on reducing the impact that the production of goods has on the environment. When the possible rebound effect of even increasing levels of "ethical consumption" are taken into consideration, the net result might be detrimental for the environment.

In some cases, the proliferation of private standards related to environmental aspects resulted in fragmentation of the marketplace and potential dilution of their intended effects. The formal international standardization system is a platform that can potentially complement, or help to harmonize various private standards, and help provide coherent global solutions. Concerns have been expressed around Multi-stakeholder involvement and promotion of private standards in the standards setting development process.

== See also ==
- Ecolabel
- Environmental policy
- Environmental standard
- Environmental Law
- Environmental policy of the European Union
- Sustainable development
- Sustainability
- Life-cycle assessment
- Corporate social responsibility
- Sustainable Agriculture
- Forest Management
- Nature Conservation
- Biodiversity
