= Sustainable sourcing =

Globalization of supply chains and pressure to lower production costs have negatively impacted environments and communities around the world, especially in developing nations where production of high demand goods is increasingly taking place. Since the 1990s, awareness of these negative impacts has grown, leading stakeholders to push companies to take responsibility and actively work to improve the sustainability of their supply chains. It has come to be understood that a company is only as sustainable as the start of its supply chain, bringing about the need for sustainable sourcing. Sustainable sourcing refers to the inclusion of social, environmental, and economic criteria in the sourcing process. In practice, companies implement sustainable sourcing through supplier codes of conduct, supplier selection and assessment, and supplier development.

== Background ==
Sustainable sourcing finds its roots in the concept of Corporate Social Responsibility (CSR), which gained popularity in the United States in the 1970s and internationally in the 1990s. CSR has evolved over time from a philanthropy-based strategy for responding to consumer concerns, to a decision-making process that takes into consideration the various facets of a company's impacts. CSR came to include environmental responsibility in the 1990s with the introduction of John Elkington's "Triple Bottom Line", which highlighted the responsibility businesses have to the environment, in addition to their economic and social responsibilities. Since the introduction of the triple bottom line, sustainability has become an important topic for most organizations.

In the past, companies were often able to separate themselves from unsustainable and unethical practices within their supply chains, as long as their internal practices were considered to be sustainable. Supply chain scandals such as child labor in Nike factories in the 1990s, use of toxic lead paint in Mattel toys in the early 2000s, and more recently the collapse of a factory linked to Primark in Bangladesh, however, have worked to increase awareness of unsustainable supply chain behaviors. Pressure from stakeholders forced companies to begin taking responsibility for improving sustainability beyond the organizational level. As companies became responsible for the sustainability of their partners in the supply chain, in addition to that of their immediate organization, it came to be understood that a company is only as sustainable as its suppliers.

== Defining sustainable sourcing ==
Sustainable sourcing can be defined as obtaining the materials, products, and services an organization needs from its suppliers in a manner that is socially and environmentally responsible, while still being economically sound.

=== Environmentally responsible ===
Supply chain activities mainly impact the environment in two ways: natural resource depletion and/or production of harmful pollutants. These impacts have further implications for the natural world, leading to biodiversity loss, habitat destruction, soil degradation, and disruption of natural cycles. To mitigate these impacts and meet the 'environmentally responsible' component of sustainable sourcing, a company may take steps such as requiring suppliers to use certain materials, and evaluating various environmental metrics when selecting suppliers. 1

=== Socially responsible ===
Supply chains activities also have a social dimension. Companies often fall short in ensuring fair treatment and safe working conditions for workers, especially in developing countries where a large portion of production happens. Furthermore, previously mentioned environmental impacts also have health and wellbeing implications for communities. To mitigate these impacts and meet the 'socially responsible' component of sustainable sourcing, a company may take steps such as mandating labor standards among suppliers, and evaluating multiple social metrics when selecting suppliers.

=== Economically sound ===
In traditional sourcing practices, the focus is put on getting the best quality product possible at the most reasonable price, with little consideration given to the impacts of producing such a product. Sustainable sourcing requires companies meet high environmental and social standards while continuing to provide good economic value at a competitive cost.

== Ensuring sustainability ==
Sustainable sourcing is a growing trend within many industries, as is the utilization of sustainability standards and certifications to promote and measure the progress of sustainable practices.

=== Voluntary Sustainability Standards (VSS) ===
Regulation of global business practices has seen a significant shift from governmental to private, as companies are increasingly held accountable by consumers and society as a whole. Numerous sustainability standards have been developed since the 1970s, and new standards continuously appear.

Voluntary Sustainability Standards, set at the local, national or international level by organizations from the public and private sectors, are voluntary commitments made by companies to promote sustainability along the entire value chain, and have evolved as part of this regulatory shift. Voluntary Sustainability Standards are defined by the United Nations Forum on Sustainability Standards as:

"Requirements that producers, traders, manufacturers, retailers or service providers may be asked to meet, relating to a wide range of sustainability metrics, including respect for basic human rights, worker health and safety, the environmental impacts of production, community relations, land use planning and others."

Voluntary Sustainability Standards can differ in many ways including actors/stakeholders involved, regulatory mechanisms, strategies, content, and scope. The following are the main types of VSS:

==== Voluntary government-led certification ====
Numerous governments utilize or are beginning to utilize Voluntary Sustainability Standards to promote green growth. In developing nations, the use of VSS by governments has the potential to increase market access for exported goods and services. In developed nations, the use of VSS by governments can be helpful in managing and reducing the environmental and social costs often associated with imported goods. The use of VSS by governments can also act as a stepping stone where implementation of mandatory certification proves difficult.

An example of a voluntary government-led certification is the United States' USDA Organic label. This scheme provides both social and environmental benefits. Farmers who choose to certify see higher profits, as consumers are willing to pay a premium of about 30% for organic foods, and the environment benefits from reduced pollution and increased biodiversity associated with organic farming practices.

==== NGO certification ====
NGOs played a significant role in the initial development of sustainability standards in the 1970s and 1980s, and continue to act as a driving force for sustainability in various industries. NGOs are responsible for a number of the most well-known certification and labeling schemes including FairTrade, Rainforest Alliance, UTZ Certified, and the Organic- /Bio- Standard.

The FairTrade label was created in the late 1980s by a Dutch development agency in collaboration with Mexican farmers. FairTrade finds its origins in the fair trade social movement which began in the late 1950s and aims to promote community development in disadvantaged parts of the world. The objective of the FairTrade label is to empower small producers and improve their ability to trade within the global market, primarily through a minimum price that must be paid to producers. The minimum price is set by FairTrade International depending on local economic conditions and is meant to cover both the cost of sustainable production and a decent living quality.

A variety of products are covered by FairTrade standards. The following products are listed on FairTrade International's website: bananas, cocoa, coffee, flowers, sugar, tea, cotton, fruit/juices, herbs/spices, honey, nuts/oils, quinoa, rice, vegetables, wine, gold, sports balls, textiles, carbon, and composites.

As of 2019, there are over 1,800 FairTrade producer organizations.

The Rainforest Alliance was created in the late 1980s from a social movement dedicated to preserving rainforests and their biodiversity. Its certification scheme is meant to ensure that farms of all sizes in the tropics meet social and environmental conditions, as set out by the Network for Sustainable Agriculture, in order to prevent further destruction of tropical rainforests, while improving the lives of farmers. A main component of the certification scheme is the required production of a detailed plan for the development of a sustainable farm management system that will allow for conservation goals to be met. In 2020, the Rainforest Alliance redesigned its certification program making a number of significant changes such as shifting away from the one-size-fits-all model and pass/fail system it had previously used when evaluating producers.

The Rainforest Alliance certifies a number of agricultural and forest products, which it divides into the following six categories on its website: Flowers and Plants, Food and Beverages, Health and Beauty, Home and Kitchen, Printing Services, and Sporting Goods.

As of 2019, over 2 million farmers have been certified by the Rainforest Alliance, and over 5,000 companies work with the Rainforest Alliance to source certified ingredients.

UTZ Certified was created in 1997 by a Dutch company, Ahold Coffee Company, with the aim of creating an open and transparent marketplace for socially and environmentally responsible agricultural products. UTZ Certified has implemented two main tools, the UTZ Code of Conduct which emphasizes environmental practices that promote biodiversity, conservation, etc., and the UTZ Traceability System which makes certified products traceable from producer to consumer. UTZ Certified became a part of the Rainforest Alliance in 2018.

The Organic- or Bio-Standard was developed in the 1970s, based on the International Federation of Organic Agriculture Movements' (IFOAM) Basic Standards. The IFOAM Basic Standards provide a framework or minimum requirements made up primarily of environmental criteria along with a few social and economic criteria, that can be used by private certification organizations or governments to develop their own standards.

==== Multi-stakeholder Sustainability Initiatives (MSIs) ====
Multi-stakeholder Sustainability Initiatives (MSIs) are partnerships between a group of stakeholders (NGOs, companies, suppliers, governments, etc.) that aim to improve the sustainability of production, sourcing, and manufacturing practices for a specific product or sector through the use of voluntary, market-based approaches. MSIs develop standards and issue certifications, but also have the ability to serve as learning platforms. Some well-known examples of MSIs include the Roundtable on Sustainable Palm Oil, the Forest Stewardship Council, the Better Cotton Initiative, and the Global Coffee Platform.

The Roundtable on Sustainable Palm Oil (RSPO) is a group that brings together stakeholders from throughout the palm oil industry to develop global sustainability standards for palm oil. The RSPO provides the Certified Sustainable Palm Oil (CSPO) label to companies that comply with a set of environmental and social criteria that are meant to minimize the negative impact that palm oil cultivation can have on people and the environment in palm oil producing regions. Stakeholders involved include environmental, social, or development focused NGOs, consumer goods manufacturers, oil palm growers, retailers, and more.

The Forest Stewardship Council (FSC) brings together experts from all different industries and fields to promote the sustainable management of the world's forests, and provide a foundation for global forest management standards. The FSC's certification program, which ensures that products are being sourced from responsibly managed forests and provide social, environmental, and economic benefits, includes three labels: FSC 100%, FSC Recycled, and FSC Mix.

The Better Cotton Initiative (BCI) works to promote the sustainable production of cotton in adherence with the Better Cotton Standard System. The system is made up of six components including criteria for what 'Better Cotton' is, support and training for cotton farmers, regular farm assessments to measure progress, a framework for developing better connections between suppliers and consumers, communication of important information, and monitoring of results and impacts. The BCI is made up of a wide variety of stakeholders from farmers to fashion companies and textile brands, as well as civil society organizations.

The Global Coffee Platform (GCP) is made up of coffee producers, roasters, retailers, traders, governments, donors, and NGOs working together to improve the sustainability and profitability of coffee production, while ensuring the wellbeing of farmers and the environment. The GCP developed the Baseline Coffee Code, which contains principles of both good and bad agricultural and management practices, as well as international conventions, to act as a sector wide reference for sustainability.

==== Company-led standards ====
As sustainability has become an increasingly important focus for most businesses, companies have chosen to tackle the challenge in a variety of ways. While some have chosen to certify products through existing programs developed by NGOs or join in on Multi-stakeholder Sustainability Initiatives, many companies have chosen to develop their own sustainability standards in line with their specific goals and needs. Notable examples of company-led sustainability standards include Starbucks' C.A.F.E. Practices and Unilever's Sustainable Agricultural Code.

In 2004, having previously partnered with CARE and Conservation International, Starbucks launched their Coffee and Farmer Equity (C.A.F.E.) Practices program, which measure coffee farms by a number of environmental, social, and economic criteria in order to ensure both sustainable growing practices and fair living conditions for farmers. Now, over 99% of the 650 billion pounds of coffee Starbucks purchases annually is ethically sourced, according to C.A.F.E. standards.

Unilever's Sustainable Agriculture Code was developed throughout the early 2000s and officially published in 2010. The code provides the company's definition of sustainable agriculture, and lays out a set of practices for soil management, crop husbandry, animal husbandry, and treatment of people (working conditions, health and safety, training, etc.) that Unilever requires their suppliers to adhere to.

== Sustainable sourcing in practice ==
Companies in many different industries are taking steps to source products and materials more sustainably. The following provide examples of sustainable sourcing in practice:

=== H&M Group ===
The H&M Group is a design and fashion company made up of a family of brands including H&M, H&M Home, COS, Arket, Monki, Weekday, & Other Stories, and Afound. The company has committed to making "great design available to everyone in a sustainable way." To fulfill this commitment, the company is working to ensure that all raw materials used in their products are sourced in a responsible and sustainable manner. As of 2020, 64.5% of the materials used by the company's brand were recycled or otherwise sustainably sourced. The company aims to reach 100% by 2030.

H&M Group utilizes their Sustainable Impact Partnership Program (SIPP) to assess supplier compliance with the company's Sustainability Commitment, and to measure overall sustainability of suppliers over time. H&M Group also utilizes sustainability standards developed by NGOs, other companies, and multi-stakeholder initiatives, including the Good Cashmere Standard from the Aid for Trade Foundation, the Responsible Mohair Standard from Textile Exchange, the Responsible Down Standard from The North Face, and certifications from the Better Cotton Initiative and the Forest Stewardship Council.

=== Patagonia ===
Patagonia is an outdoor clothing and gear company that is actively working to address environmental and social issues through a number of avenues including political activism, community engagement and advocacy, and a self-imposed 'Earth Tax,' along with sustainable initiatives in the company's supply chain.

Patagonia has developed a number of programs to ensure sustainability in their supply chain including the Supply Chain Environmental Responsibility Program, which is used to measure and reduce the environmental impacts of manufacturing products and materials at supplier facilities worldwide, and the Material Traceability Program, which is used to ensure that the most sustainable options are in fact being utilized all along the supply chain.

Cotton used by Patagonia has been 100% organic since 1996. More recently, the company began using recycled cotton and helped found the Regenerative Organic Alliance to manage the Regenerative Organic Certified Pilot.

Patagonia also utilizes sustainability standards developed outside of the company such as NSF International's Advanced Global Traceable Down Standard, and certifications from the Forest Stewardship Council and Fair Trade International.

=== Costa Coffee ===
Costa Coffee is a coffee shop chain with over 2,000 locations in the UK and more than 1,000 locations throughout 30 other countries. The company has made commitments to ensuring sustainability within their supply chain, focusing on two main aspects: people and product.

Costa Coffee's Supplier Guiding Principles set out the basic human rights standards the company expects of all of its suppliers and business partners. The company also started the Costa Foundation in 2007, which funds schools and school projects in coffee-growing communities. Costa Coffee also utilizes sustainability standards from outside of the company. They've been a member of the Roundtable on Sustainable Palm Oil since 2020, and 100% of the coffee beans used by the company come from Rainforest Alliance Certified farms.

== Implementation of Sustainable Sourcing ==
Research on sustainable sourcing has grown rapidly since the early 2000s. Bibliometric reviews identify recurring themes, such as supplier selection and evaluation, ethical sourcing practices, environmental criteria and certifications, and buyer-supplier relationships. A review of 287 journal articles on sustainable global sourcing categorized the literature into five main research areas. These include ethical sourcing, as well as environmental criteria and certifications.

Seuring and Müller distinguish between two main strategies for managing sustainability in supply chains. The first, "supplier management for risk and performance," establishes minimum requirements for suppliers and monitors compliance to avoid operational and reputational risks. The second concept, "supply chain management for sustainable products," entails closer cooperation with suppliers to offer products that meet higher environmental and social standards.

Typically, implementation follows a series of stages. First, companies set expectations, with a supplier code of conduct that highlights labor rights, health and safety, and environmental performance. Secondly, they apply sustainability criteria when selecting suppliers, evaluating them through questionnaires and audits, and collaborating with them to improve their performance via training and longer-term relationships. Public and international organizations apply a similar logic to procurement, integrating environmental, social, and economic criteria at every stage of the procurement cycle.

== Addressing the challenges ==
Sustainable sourcing is a relatively basic concept in theory, but companies face a number of challenges when implementing it.

One of the most significant challenges has to do with sustainability standards and certifications. Literature on the topic suggests that growing numbers of sustainability standards has led to increased cost and administrative responsibility for producers, as well as confusion over the meaning and legitimacy of the various standards. Yet, with greater claims of sustainability for conditions that may not warrant it, there is a growing movement of major brands such as PepsiCo and Nestle in distinguishing between responsible vs sustainable sourcing, also evidenced in North Face's Responsible Down Standard. Responsible sourcing refers to compliance with ethical or responsible practices (e.g., no child or forced labor, and availability of decent working conditions). Sustainable sourcing goes beyond compliance to taking action to improve conditions of sustainability, engaging in areas such as livelihoods, climate-smart practices, and other social, environmental, and economic conditions. Adoption of common metrics for measuring sustainability would provide a solution for this challenge. Many initiatives, such as the Global Coffee Platform and the Roundtable on Sustainable Palm Oil, are working to define a common set of standards within specific sectors. The Committee on Sustainability Assessment is one of the main organizations promoting global adoption of common sustainability metrics.

Other key challenges include transparency and traceability along the value chain. Tools such as tracking and reporting software, customized search engines for purchasing, etc., could be utilized to address these challenges.

== UN Sustainable Development Goals ==
The 17 Sustainable Development Goals are a key part of the United Nations' 2030 Agenda for Sustainable Development. Sustainable sourcing is directly related to SDG 12: Responsible Consumption and Production, and can also contribute to achieving a number of the other SDGs including SDG 1: No Poverty, SDG 2: Zero Hunger, SDG 3: Good Health and Well-being, SDG 4: Quality Education, SDG 5: Gender Equality, SDG 8: Decent Work and Economic Growth, SDG 10: Reduced Inequalities, SDG 11: Sustainable Cities and Communities, SDG 13: Climate Action, SDG 14: Life Below Water, and SDG 15: Life on Land.
