= Better Cotton Initiative =

Non-profit Swiss association

- Formation: 2005; 21 years ago (as Better Cotton Initiative)^{a}
- Type: Not-for-profit Swiss association
- VAT ID no.: CHE-317.159.900 MWST
- Registration no.: Swiss UID CHE-317.159.900
- Purpose: Sustainability standards and certification
- Region served: Worldwide
- Website: https://bettercotton.org/

The Better Cotton Initiative (BCI) is a non-profit, multistakeholder governance group that promotes better standards in cotton farming and practices across 22 countries. As of 2024, BCI accounts for 23% of global cotton production. In the 2023-2024 cotton season, 1.39 million licensed farmers grew 5.64 million tonnes of BCI Cotton. Partner retailers include H&M, Gap, IKEA, and Levi Strauss, and include funding partners from USAID.

At the end of 2022, the Better Cotton Initiative had over 2,563 members – 325 retailer and brand members, 2,171 supplier and manufacturer members, 17 producer organisation members, 34 civil society members and 16 associate members. BCI contributes towards the UN's goals to achieve better global water sustainability and sustainable agriculture.

BCI farmers receive training on how to use water efficiently, care for the health of the soil and natural habitats, minimise the impact of harmful crop protection practices, preserve fibre quality and apply decent work principles. It also promotes the use of better irrigation practices with farmers, as well as reducing the use of fertilizers. Some examples point to a 40% reduction in water use by farmers in Pakistan, and a 53% decrease in overall pesticide use among farmers in India between the 2014-17 cotton seasons (used as a three-season average) and the 2021/2022 season. BCI is currently the only notable sustainability standard in the cotton sector that allows farmers to grow genetically modified cotton.

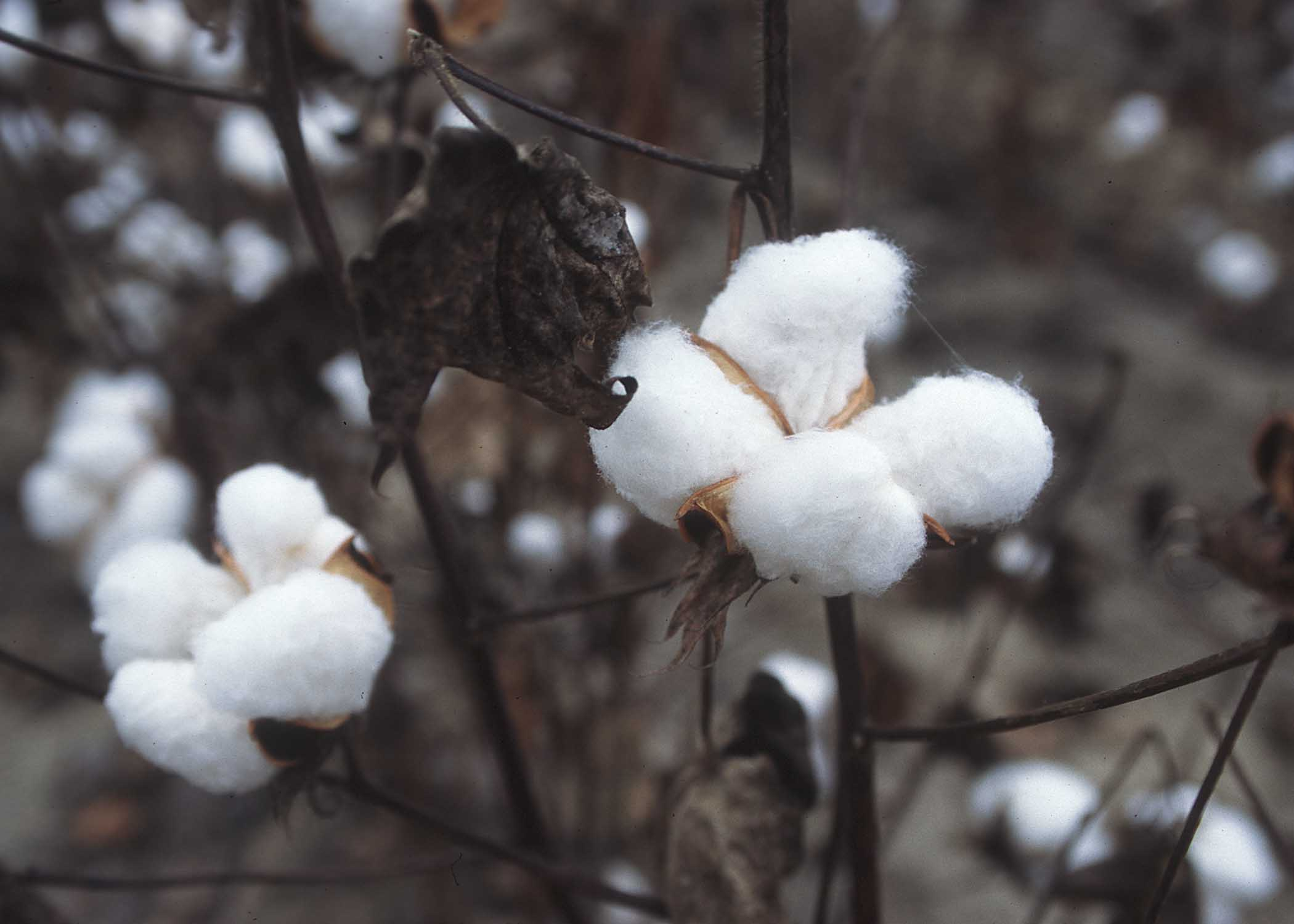
Cotton bolls on the cotton plant are ready for harvesting and processing into cotton yarn and fabric.

Some similar conservation efforts for cotton farming practices include Bayer's CropScience's e3 sustainable cotton program.

== Definition ==
The Better Cotton Initiative's "global definition" describes "BCI Cotton" in terms of the behaviours of its farmers:

- BCI Cotton is produced by farmers who:

- minimise the harmful impact of crop protection practices
- promote water stewardship
- care for the health of the soil
- enhance biodiversity and use land responsibly
- care for and preserve fibre quality
- promote Decent Work
- operate an effective management system

== History ==
Prior logo, used 2015-2021.

The Better Cotton Initiative started in a roundtable discussion by the World Wildlife Fund (WWF) in 2005. It exists to make global cotton production better for the people who produce it, better for the environment it grows in and better for the sector’s future. Implementation of practices began in 2010 including regions and countries in Africa, as well as Brazil, India, and Pakistan. The initiative expanded to several other new countries in 2013 including China, Tajikistan, Turkey, and Mozambique.

Previously named "Better Cotton", the organisation changed its name to the "Better Cotton Initiative" in 2025.

Levi Strauss has released figures that donations to the Better Cotton Initiative between 2009 and 2011 were approximately $600,000.

=== Xinjiang cotton boycott ===
In March 2020, BCI suspended licensing and assurance activities in the Xinjiang Uyghur Autonomous Region of China due to "persistent allegations" of forced labor in the region. In October 2020, BCI ceased all field-level activities in Xinjiang, citing "sustained allegations of forced labour and other human rights abuses" in the region leading to "an increasingly untenable operating environment".

Prior logo, used since 2021.

In March 2021, the Chinese consumers start to boycott companies who have vowed against using cotton in Xinjiang. Chinese consumers criticized H&M, which in September 2020 announced it would stop using a Chinese manufacturer accused with using forced labor, citing BCI's decision to stop licensing Xinjiang cotton. People's Daily named New Balance, Burberry and all BCI members in online posts, calling for Chinese consumers to boycott these brands. Chinese celebrities terminated endorsements of the companies mentioned. Amid the boycotts, Chinese sportswear company Anta Sports announced it was exiting BCI, citing their statement on Xinjiang as "seriously concerning".

On March 26, 2021, the BCI Shanghai representative office said it found no evidence of forced labor in Xinjiang. The office stated that since 2012, the Xinjiang project site has performed second-party credibility audits and third-party verifications over the years, to reach their findings. The Better Cotton Initiative subsequently removed its October 2020 statement from its website regarding the ceasing of field-level activities in Xinjiang.

== Labor practices ==
The Better Cotton Initiative advertises that it encourages fair work practices and reduction of child labor in countries such as India by raising public awareness. The company has also worked with an independent consultancy, Ergon Associates in 2012 in a study to create formal policies, training partnerships, and research on farmer incomes, safety, and labor. In 2018 Terre des hommes Foundation (Tdh), the leading Swiss organisation for children’s aid, partnered with BCI to support cotton farmers, to address and prevent the risks of child labour and to promote decent work in cotton farming.

Partners may use unannounced spot checks for work environments and conduct worker interviews to assess levels of child labor and bonded labor. The International Resources for Fairer Trade (IRFT) also organizes training sessions for work environments and topics on agronomics.

== Responses ==
In 2017, independent studies and journalistic investigations sought to demonstrate that BCI was offering greenwashing solutions to firms or intermediate producers that are systematically resorting to child labour, forced labour, intensive irrigation or massive pesticide spraying. They have accused BCI of providing a marketable 'one-size-fits-all' consumer label to clothing firms that does not offer any information or guarantee in terms of social and environmental responsibility. BCI responded to these allegations as an unjustified representation of its activity.

== See also ==
- Organic cotton
- Sustainable sourcing
- Xinjiang cotton industry
- Fast fashion in China
