= MCERT =

MCERT may refer to:

- Ministry for Cities, Environment, Regions and Transport, a public service department of New Zealand
- Macleans Certification, a qualification from Macleans College
- Environment Agency's Monitoring Certification Scheme (MCERTS)
