= Robin Wood =

Robin Wood may refer to:

- Robin Wood (artist) (1953–2021), Michigan-based fantasy artist
- Robin Wood (Buffy the Vampire Slayer), character of the American TV show Buffy the Vampire Slayer
- Robin Wood (writer) (1944–2021), Paraguayan comics writer
- Robin Wood (critic) (1931–2009), British-Canadian film critic
- Robin Wood (environmental organisation), German environmental advocacy group
- Robin Wood, archaic name for Robin Hood

== See also ==
- Robin Woods (1914–1997), English dean
