= Forest Stewardship Council =

Global forest certification system

Forest Stewardship Council (FSC)
- Founded: 1993
- Purpose: Sustainable forestry
- Location: Bonn, Germany
- Region served: Global
- Method: Certification
- Key people: Kim Carstensen, Director General
- Website: fsc.org

The Forest Stewardship Council GmbH (FSC) is a German international non-profit, multistakeholder organization established in 1993 that promotes responsible management of the world's forests via timber certification. This organization uses a market-based approach to transnational environmental policy.

FSC is a global forest certification system established for forests and forest products. According to the council, the use of the FSC logo signifies that a product comes from environmentally, socially, and economically responsible sources. In addition to its global certification standard, FSC develops national standards in selected countries. The FSC has 10 Principles and associated Criteria (FSC P&C) that form the basis for all FSC standards and certification.

FSC was established in 1993 as a response to concerns over global deforestation. It now has around 1200 members, including the World Wide Fund for Nature and IKEA.

== History ==
Tropical deforestation as a global concern rose to prominence in the 1980s and can be attributed in part to environmentalists and northern countries advocating for the need to protect tropical woodland. A number of other economic and regulatory mechanisms such as financial aid, policy frameworks, and trade conventions were also established to prevent and mitigate deforestation. These include the International Tropical Timber Agreement (1983), the Convention of International Trade on Endangered Species (1975) and the Global Environment Facility (1991).

Despite the increased levels of concern in the run-up to the 1992 Earth Summit held in Rio de Janeiro, tensions between the North and the global South over access to finance and technology for the preservation of forests protracted negotiations. Although many Northern countries had hoped for a legally binding convention, the resulting Statement of Forest Principles represents the "mean position of the lowest common denominator" and is voluntary. Disappointed with the outcome of the Earth Summit, NGOs such as the World Wide Fund for Nature (WWF) began to turn their attention to industry for a governance-oriented resolution to deforestation.

In the lead-up to the Earth Summit, social groups, NGOs, and industries were also beginning to consult on the issue of deforestation. In America, the consultation process that eventually led to the establishment of the FSC was initiated in 1990 and concluded in the confirmation of support for the development of a voluntary worldwide certification and accreditation governance system that would cover all forest types.

In the UK, NGO WWF began to facilitate action through the establishment of the 1995 Group, recruiting organizations that had been spurred on by instances of direct action and boycotting over the sale of tropical wood to form an NGO-business partnership. Through stakeholder involvement, it became apparent that a standard-setting body would be required to verify the source of wood products and define sustainable forest management. After 18 months of consultation in ten different countries, the Forest Stewardship Council was established in 1993.

The failure of governments to reach any notable form of consensus in the form of an internationally reaching and legally binding agreement caused both disillusionment and an opportunity for change through the involvement of civil society and business actors to form "soft law". As such the establishment of the Forest Stewardship Council as the response to this disillusionment also represents a global shift from government to governance and its creation is a primary example of the use of market and economic factors to create movement on a global environmental issue.

In February 2012, the membership approved the first major revision to the 10 Principles and associated Criteria (FSC P&C), which form the basis for all FSC standards and certification, in order to bring its certification up to date. The review and revision of the FSC P&C began in 2008 and gathered feedback from many FSC members and other stakeholders. This revision also marked the start of a process of developing baseline requirements for each of the revised Criteria. These requirements – called International Generic Indicators (IGIs) – are intended to ensure consistent application of the FSC P&C across all countries. Where national standards are not currently established, the IGIs will be used as interim standards.

On 25 September 2009, the first FSC Friday took place in Bonn. FSC Friday is a once-a-year promotional event dedicated to the celebration of forests around the globe and the promotion of responsible forest management worldwide.

== Purpose ==
The FSC's stated mission is to "promote environmentally appropriate, socially beneficial, and economically viable management of the world's forests". It claims that forests managed to its standards offer benefits to both local and wider communities, and these are said to include cleaner air and water, and a contribution to mitigating the effects of climate change. FSC addresses issues such as illegal logging, deforestation and global warming and some reports indicate positive effects on economic development, environmental conservation, poverty alleviation, and social and political empowerment.

To this end, the body has published a global strategy with five goals:

1. Advancing globally responsible forest management.
2. Ensure equitable access to the benefits of FSC systems.
3. Ensure integrity, credibility and transparency of the FSC system.
4. Create business value for products from FSC certified forests.
5. Strengthen the global network to deliver on goals 1 through 4.

These goals are promoted, managed, and developed through six program areas: forests, chain of custody, social policy, monitoring and evaluation, quality assurance, and ecosystem services.

== Structure and governance ==
FSC is an international membership organization with a governance structure based on participation, democracy, equity and transparency. It is a platform for forest owners, timber industries, social groups and environmental organizations to find solutions to improve forest management practices. It is an example of a product-oriented multistakeholder governance group.

It is governed by its members, who join either as individuals or as representatives of organizations. Members apply to join one of three chambers – environmental, social and economic. Each chamber is divided into northern and southern sub-chambers and votes are weighted to ensure that north and south each have 50%. This system is designed to ensure that influence is shared equally between different interest groups, without having to limit the number of members.

FSC has three levels of decision-making bodies: The General Assembly, the Board of Directors and the executive director. The General Assembly, which takes place every three years, is made up of the three membership chambers and is the highest decision-making body in FSC. Every member has the right to attend, formulate and submit motions, and vote. The FSC Board of Directors is accountable to the FSC members. It is made up of nine elected individuals who are FSC members and advocates. One member of the board of directors is elected from each sub-chamber of the General Assembly. The executive director runs FSC on a day-to-day basis with the support of a professional team at the FSC International Center. He or she is accountable to the FSC Board of Directors.

While the FSC International Center is based in Bonn, Germany, it has a decentralized network of FSC Network Partners that promote responsible forest management on behalf of FSC. FSC Network Partners include FSC National Offices, FSC National Representatives and FSC National Focal Points.

Subhra Bhattacharjee has been the Director General of the Forest Stewardship Council (FSC) since October 2024.

=== Membership and partners ===
FSC has around 1200 members, including NGOs such as the World Wide Fund for Nature; civil society organizations; forestry-focused research organizations; certification organizations; private companies in the forestry, timber and paper industries, such as IKEA (Sweden); and trade unions and workers' associations.

Numerous governments worldwide have strengthened market-based incentives for timber certification by providing tax benefits to certified companies, referencing certified products as requirements in their procurement policies and supporting projects linked to FSC through their international development agencies. Some companies also choose timber certification as a tool to demonstrate their commitment to sustainability.

FSC is a member of the International Social and Environmental Accreditation and Labelling (ISEAL) Alliance, an association of voluntary international standard setting and certification organizations focused on social and environmental issues. Since 2006, FSC has complied with ISEAL's Code of Good Practice for Setting Social and Environmental standards, aimed at assuring high standards for credible behavior in ethical trade.

In 2009, FSC began a pilot project with Fairtrade International (FLO) to help community-based and small-scale timber producers get a fair price for their products and gain visibility in the marketplace. The first jointly labelled FSC-FLO products went onto the market in 2011, using wood from the forests of the Curacautín Valley in Chile, manufactured commercially by Swedish firm Kährs.

FSC also works in liaison with the International Organization for Standardization (ISO). It contributes to the ISO's committees on sustainable criteria for bioenergy, environmental auditing and environmental labelling.

== Standards and accreditation ==
FSC is a global forest certification system established for forests and forest products. FSC International sets the framework for developing and maintaining international, national and sub-national standards. This is intended to ensure that the process for developing FSC policies and standards is transparent, independent and participatory. A number of alternative national and regional forest certification bodies also exist around the globe.

The FSC has 10 Principles and associated Criteria that form the basis for all FSC standards and certification.

Using the FSC logo supposedly signifies that the product comes from responsible sources—environmentally appropriate, socially beneficial and economically viable. The FSC label is used on a wide range of timber and non-timber products, from paper and furniture to medicine and jewelry, and aims to give consumers the option of supporting responsible forestry.

=== National Forest Stewardship Standard ===
In addition to its global certification standard, FSC develops national standards in selected countries. These standards are closely aligned to the global certification standard and its criteria, but are adapted to local context conditions. Currently, so called National Forest Stewardship Standards exist for the following countries (sorted by first year of introduction):

- Brazilian Amazon (2001)
- Peru (2001)
- Colombia Natural Forests (2003)
- Denmark (2004, 2018)
- Netherlands (2004, 2018)
- Canadian Boreal Forests (2004)
- British Columbia (2005)
- Chile Plantations (2005)
- Spain (2006, 2020)
- Colombia Bamboo (2006)
- Luxembourg (2007, 2019)
- Canadian Maritime Region (2008)
- Sweden (2010)
- Papua New Guinea (2010, 2017)
- United States of America (2010)
- Finland (2010)
- Cameroon (2010, 2012)
- United Kingdom (2011, 2017)
- Central African Republic (2012)
- Republic of Congo (2012)
- Congo Basin Region (2012)
- Serbian Kosovo (2012)
- Ghana (2012)
- Russian Federation (2012)
- Germany (2012, 2017)
- New Zealand (2012)
- Democratic Republic of Congo (2012)
- Gabon (2012)
- Ireland (2012)
- Republic of Indonesia (2013)
- Poland (2013)
- Czech Republic (2013)
- Honduras (2014)
- Nicaragua (2014)
- Federal Republic of Brazil (2014)
- Bulgaria (2016)
- Metropolitan France (2016)
- People's Republic of China (2016)
- Portugal (2016)
- Italy (2017)
- Romania (2017)
- Kyrgyz Republic (2017)
- Rwanda (2017)
- Federal Republic of Germany (2017)
- Republic of Uganda (2017)
- South Africa (2017)
- Switzerland and Liechtenstein (2018)
- Brazilian Small and Low Intensity Managed Forests (2013)
- Tanzania Mainland (2018)
- Canada (2018)
- Australia (2018)
- Japan (2018)
- Nepal (2018)
- Malaysia (2018)
- Vietnam (2018)
- Bosnia and Herzegovina (2019)
- Ukraine (2019)
- Republic of Namibia (2019)

=== Accreditation ===
FSC does not conduct certification audits itself, developing procedures and standards to evaluate whether certification bodies can provide independent and competent certification services. This process is known as 'accreditation'.

A potential certification body must gain FSC accreditation to be able to evaluate, monitor and certify companies to FSC standards. To become FSC accredited, certifiers have to comply with an extensive set of rules and procedures verified by Assurance Services International GmbH – an international assurance organisation for voluntary sustainability standards and initiatives including MSC and RSPO. To control the continued implementation of FSC rules and procedures, every year ASI conducts at least one office and one field assessment for each FSC accredited certification body. The exact number and distribution of ASI assessments takes a number of complex factors into account (geographic areas, policies or products that carry increased risk) and the number of FSC certificates handled by an accredited certification body.

Some summaries of ASI surveillance audits are publicly available on the ASI website. If an FSC accredited certification body is found to not fully comply with FSC rules and procedures, nonconformities are raised.

If an accreditation body finds forest management at an organisation to be non-compliant, pre-conditions are noted which must be fulfilled before the FSC certificate can be awarded. If minor non-compliances are noted, the certificate can be issued with conditions that have to be met within a clearly determined timeframe. An accreditation body audits each FSC certificate issued at least once a year. Non-compliance results in a request to make the prescribed changes within a given timeframe or lose its FSC certificate. Depending on the seriousness of the infringement, the timeline can go from one year for minor administrative infringements to immediate action for major infringements.

== Certifications ==
In September 2012, some 165 million hectares were certified to FSC's Principles and Criteria in 80 countries. Around 24,000 FSC Chain of Custody certificates were active in 107 countries. The FSC website has statistics on regional distributions, ownership and forest type and numbers of FSC certificates representing all valid forest management and chain of custody certificates. The expenses for successful forest management certification typically are divided into costs for the enhancement of sustainability, audits, and secondary costs (e.g. losses of stumpage revenues).

=== Forest management certification ===
Forest management certification is a voluntary process for verifying responsible forest practices. An FSC-accredited certification body performs a forest inspection at the request of the forest owner or operator. Certificate holders are charged an annual fee to renew their accreditation, and continuous compliance is expected.

The FSC P&C apply to all tropical, temperate and boreal forests and many tree plantations and partially replanted forests. Though mainly designed for forest management for timber products, they are also largely relevant for non-timber products (e.g. Brazil nuts) and other environmental services such as clean water and air and carbon sequestration.

The Revised P&C were approved in February 2012. The basic requirements are:

1. The Organization shall comply with all applicable laws, regulations and nationally ratified international treaties, conventions and agreements.
2. The Organization shall maintain or enhance the social and economic wellbeing of workers.
3. The Organization shall identify and uphold indigenous peoples' legal and customary rights of ownership, use and management of land, territories and resources affected by management activities.
4. The Organization shall contribute to maintaining or enhancing the social and economic wellbeing of local communities
5. The Organization shall efficiently manage the range of multiple products and services of the Management Unit to maintain or enhance long-term economic viability and the range of environmental and social benefits.
6. The Organization shall maintain, conserve and/or restore ecosystem services and environmental values of the Management Unit, and shall avoid, repair or mitigate negative environmental impacts.
7. The Organization shall have a management plan consistent with its policies and objectives and proportionate to scale, intensity and risks of its management activities. The management plan shall be implemented and kept up to date based on monitoring information in order to promote adaptive management. The associated planning and procedural documentation shall be sufficient to guide staff, inform affected stakeholders and interested stakeholders and to justify management decisions.
8. The Organization shall demonstrate that, progress towards achieving the management objectives, the impacts of management activities and the condition of the Management Unit, are monitored and evaluated proportionate to the scale, intensity and risk of management activities, in order to implement adaptive management.
9. The Organization shall maintain and/or enhance the High Conservation Values in the Management Unit through applying the precautionary approach.
10. Management activities conducted by or for The Organization for the Management Unit shall be selected and implemented consistent with The Organization's economic, environmental and social policies and objectives and in compliance with the Principles and Criteria collectively.

=== Chain of Custody certification ===
The FSC Chain of Custody (CoC) system allows the tracking of FSC certified material from the forest to the consumer. It is a method by which companies can show their commitment to the environment and responsible forest management. Only companies that have FSC chain of custody certification are allowed to use the FSC trademarks and labels to promote their products. The FSC label therefore provides a link between responsible production and responsible consumption and helps the consumer to make socially and environmentally responsible buying decisions.

Once a forest is certified it is important to be able to trace the products that come from it throughout the supply chain to ensure that any claims on the origin of the product are credible and verifiable. FSC chain of custody certification is a voluntary process. It is a tracking system that allows manufacturers and traders to demonstrate that timber comes from a forest that is responsibly managed in accordance with the FSC P&C. It tracks the flow of certified wood through the supply chain and across borders through each successive stage – including processing, transformation and manufacturing – all the way to the final product. It is up to a company to initiate the certification process by requesting the services of an accredited certification body to inspect its internal tracking procedures. Companies committing to FSC include home-improvement or DIY companies, publishers and retailers, amongst many others.

All operations that want to produce an FSC-certified product or want to make corresponding sales claims must comply with FSC's international standards for chain of custody. An operation must specify the range of products they wish to sell as FSC certified and promote with the FSC trademark. The certification body inspects the operation to ensure that controls are in place to identify eligible sources for the specified product range and to prevent certified and recycled material from mixing with material from unacceptable sources. If an operation complies with FSC standards, the company is issued an FSC chain of custody certificate. Major failure to comply with the standard will normally disqualify the candidate from certification or lead to de-certification.

=== Controlled wood certification ===
The FSC Mix label was introduced in 2004. It allows manufacturers to mix FSC-certified material with uncertified materials in FSC-labeled products under controlled conditions. It aims to avoid the use of wood products from "unacceptable" sources in FSC-labeled products. Unacceptable sources include illegally harvested wood, wood harvested in violation of traditional and civil rights, wood harvested in HCV forests and wood harvested from areas where genetically modified trees are planted.

=== Recognition in green building certification systems ===
FSC certified construction wood and construction products made from FSC certified wood can contribute to green building certification systems. Some green building certification systems are recognizing a FSC certification in general. Others award different scores to products with FSC 100, FSC MIX or FSC RECYCLED.

FSC certified wood products contribute to score up to 2 points in the LEED v4.1 credit 'Sourcing of Raw Materials'. In addition, FSC certified wood products can contribute to score up to 1 point in the LEED v4.1 pilot credit 'Social Equity within the Supply Chain'. BREEAM awards credits for FSC certified wood products in the Mat 03 credit. The BREEAM Guidance Note GN18 attributes different scores to FSC 100% (7 points) and FSC MIX / FSC RECYCLED (5 points). DGNB recognizes FSC certified wood products in the ENV1.3 credit. FSC Mix scores in the Quality Level 1.2 (up to 25 out of 100 points) and FSC 100 / FSC RECYCLED score in the Quality Level 1.3 (up to 70 out of 100 points. FSC RECYCLED also scores points in the Quality Level 2.2.

=== Competing certification schemes ===
There are a number of certification schemes for forest management apart from FSC certification.

The main competing forest certification system is the Programme for the Endorsement of Forest Certification (PEFC), established by a number of stakeholders, including associations of the forest industry, pulp-and-paper production and forest owners in response to the creation and increasing popularity of FSC. PEFC has been criticized for having little influence from local people or environmental organizations, lack of transparency and non-objective requirements.

Other certification schemes include the Sustainable Forestry Initiative (SFI), the Malaysian Timber Certification Council, the Australian Forestry Standard, and Keurhout.

== Criticism ==
Since it was founded, FSC has been criticized for a range of different reasons.

=== Concerns by founding NGOs and members ===
In the late 2000s, a number of NGOs and environmental organizations withdrew their support for FSC. These included FERN (2011), Friends of the Earth UK (2008), ROBINWOOD (2009), the Swedish Society for Nature Conservation (SSNC) (2011), and smaller groups such as Rainforest Rescue and the Association for the Ecological Defence of Galicia (ADEGA).

In this same period other NGO members and commenters issued critical evaluations of FSC's performance and made recommendations to improve the credibility of the organization. Greenpeace International published a 2008 report "Holding the line with FSC" focused on controversial certificates and ways forward.

FSC was also harshly criticized by Simon Counsell, one of its founding members, later the director of the Rainforest Foundation. In 2008, he described the FSC as the "Enron of Forestry". He cited case studies from six countries which suggested that in these cases FSC was not properly controlling accredited auditors or certifiers. The FSC reviewed the certificates in question, and showed that some of the initial investigations were justified. This resulted in the removal of the license to certify from the Thai company, Forest Industry Organization.

FSC-Watch is a website critical of FSC which is run by a group of people, including Simon Counsell, who are concerned about what they perceive as the constant and serious erosion of the FSC's reliability and credibility. Its website offers a wide range of extensive and detailed criticisms of FSC. FSC-Watch commonly accuses FSC of practices that are a form of greenwashing.

In 2008, the EcoEarth/Rainforest Portal, an Internet ecological news aggregation service, publicly questioned the FSC-endorsed policy of old-growth forest logging. They asserted that research does not support the idea that this type of logging is carbon positive or sustainable, though these views are disputed.

In 2011, Greenpeace International issued a revised version of their report, which concluded that some progress had been made. But it also identified ongoing weaknesses, including a lack of guidance on high conservation value forests (HCVFs), activities in controversial areas like the Congo Basin, problems with the Controlled Wood label, and the integrity of the Chain of Custody system and logo. In 2018, Greenpeace International chose not to renew its membership with FSC, claiming that FSC is not meeting its goals of protecting forests and human rights.

=== Violation of indigenous rights and sovereignty ===
The world's largest manager of FSC certified forests, Resolute Forest Products, has been accused of illegal logging on Barriere Lake Algonquin territory and of violating indigenous rights. In July 2012, members of the Algonquin community in southern Quebec staged a camp to observe and deter the logging of their unceded territory. The firm stated that their "right to harvest in the area [had] been approved by the QMNRW, following appropriate consultation with the Barrière Lake Algonquin band council."

In 2018 FSC investigated allegations made by local tribesmen in Papua against FSC certificate holder Korindo Group. The investigation found Korindo to have violated the rights of the Papuan indigenous peoples and benefited from close ties with the Indonesian military for its own economic benefit. While the report recommended stripping Korindo of its FSC certificate, FSC chose not to publicly release the report and continued its collaboration with Korindo. In August 2021, FSC announced its decision of disassociation from the Korindo Group which came into effect on 16 October 2021.

In southern Chile, where large forest plantations for pulp production are located, there is constant criticism from indigenous communities that forestry companies have appropriated indigenous land. According to critics, the FSC certifies forest products from land areas that are the subject of a centuries-old conflict between forestry companies and the indigenous Mapuche communities.

=== Preference for bigger companies ===
Some critics argue that FSC certification is not suited for small businesses, that it is anti-competitive and that it is counter-ecological. It has been argued that only large businesses with rigid structures can afford the process of assessment and maintenance of the schemes, with certification schemes being anti-competitive because they favor larger firms over smaller ones. FSC has thus been criticised for promoting a counter-ecological model of a few massive suppliers owing to a bias towards large companies.

Partly in response to these criticisms, to make certification more accessible to small and medium-sized businesses, FSC instituted the Small and Low Intensity Managed Forests (SLIMF) initiative and group certification. SLIMF adapts the FSC system by offering special streamlined procedures with less rigorous requirements for a number of its forest management criteria. SLIMF are defined as forests of 100 hectares or less. Group certification allows a group of forest owners to share certification costs. In October 2012, worldwide, 8.7% of FSC certificates were held by community-owned forests.

=== Responses by FSC ===
Complainants to FSC must meet a number of conditions to be able to file complaints, and it is disputed whether the FSC takes effective action even in the case of some formal complaints.

FSC has implemented actions to strengthen its stakeholder engagement process. In 2013, it established a Quality Assurance Unit within FSC. To improve its process for tracking FSC certified products, FSC launched an online claims platform in 2014. This platform is intended to enable streamlined verification of specific transactions. In 2014, FSC also published dispute resolution procedures to process complaints against the certification scheme.

== Non-state market driven environmental governance ==
Because it works outside of state regulations, some academics have classified FSC as an example of a non-state market driven (NSMD) form of environmental governance. This means that it uses the market to drive the sustainable management of forests. As Cashore observes, the FSC network does not have the political authority of a traditional nation state and no one can be fined or imprisoned for failing to comply with its regulations. In addition, governments are forbidden from being members of the FSC and their only engagement with FSC is as land owners. The authority of the FSC is determined by the approval of external audiences, such as environmental NGOs.

The FSC Label is an example of the use of public purchasing power to create shifts in industry and regulate the negative environmental impacts of deforestation. The FSC Label "works" by providing an incentive for responsible forestry in the market place. It offers manufacturers a competitive advantage and thereby increases market access to new markets and maintains access to existing ones.

Non-state market-driven methods are often used because of allegations of 'state failure' in managing the environment. In the neoliberal view, market based methods are seen as one of the most effective and efficient ways to meet environmental goals. The market is seen as the key mechanism for producing the maximum social good and governance networks are seen as the most efficient way to regulate environmental concerns.

The FSC transnational NGO network demonstrates theories of global governance, more specifically in governance network theory. FSC is an example of how network governance can create change in industry and encourage organizations to improve the sustainability of industrial forestry practices. As Bäckstrand states, the FSC governance network brings together private companies, organizations and civil society in a non-hierarchical fashion, to voluntarily address certain goals. According to governance network theory, actors in the network are dependent on each other and collaborate to reach specific goals, through exchanging information or resources.

Through the chamber system, governance of FSC has checks at local, national and international levels which mean that it includes interests regardless of their geographical location. This gives FSC some advantages over state governance systems. In theory, as a governance network, FSC members share knowledge, environmental goals and knowledge of what those goals entail. This means that they coordinate effectively, improving the process and outcomes of the environmental policies they pursue. Moreover, knowledge sharing and collaboration enables the FSC network to deal with complex and interrelated issues.

Some critiques however suggest that network governance does not always work this way. Network governance theory suggests that partnerships should be equal, but inequalities of power within networks can result in hierarchical relationships determined by more dominant actors. Within FSC, larger international actors may have a stronger influence than smaller stakeholders, meaning that the FSC governance network may not represent all participants fairly. FSC has instituted the chamber system to try to tackle this imbalance.

Furthermore, actors in networks operate as representatives of certain groups but also as individuals with their own agendas and values, and members in the FSC network are usually motivated by pragmatic rather than moral considerations. Moreover, Sorenson and Torfing (2005) argue that for governance networks to achieve their goals they should be controlled by democratically elected politicians. Although formerly there were no elections in the FSC governance system, reforms mean that the board of directors is now democratically elected by the membership chambers.

== See also ==
- Certified wood
- Eco-labels
- Aquaculture Stewardship Council
- Sustainability standards and certification
- Independent forest monitoring
- Wood laundering
- Rainforest Alliance
