= United Nations Forum on Sustainability Standards =

United Nations initiative

The United Nations Forum on Sustainability Standards (UNFSS) is an initiative with a steering committee of six United Nations Agencies – Food and Agriculture Organization (FAO), International Trade Centre (ITC), UN Environment, UN Industrial Development Organization (UNIDO), United Nations Economic Commission for Europe (UNECE), and the UN Conference on Trade and Development (UNCTAD) is the secretariat of UNFSS. UNFSS headquarters are in Geneva.

== Introduction ==
=== What are VSS/ sustainability certifications ===
Voluntary Sustainability Standards (VSS) are rules and harmonized standards that provide assurance that a product follows certain sustainability metrics, such as environmental impact, fundamental human rights, labor standards, and gender equality. All VSS have a ‘system’ which implies that they are not just a set of standards with a mandatory list of practices and performances, but they go beyond it in order to drive a change. From a standards perspective, VSS can be categorized as either voluntary consensus standards or private standards. Four market mechanisms form a crucial part of the standard system: assurance, labels and claims, traceability, and capacity building.

VSS have become an important market tool and they are gaining importance in the context of international trade . With international trade having a push for being more sustainable and with the growth in the Global Value Chains (GVCs), sustainable trade has started incorporating social and economic pillars of sustainability, thereby forming the triple bottom line of sustainable development. For this reason, VSS have also gained a lot of attraction because they cater to the rapidly increasing Global Value Chains. In addition, since VSS address multiple sustainability issues across the supply chains, they are also being looked as key tools for meeting the Sustainable Development Goals (SDGs). VSS have been ascertained to align in their design most with SDG 8- Decent Work and Economic growth, SDG 12- Sustainable Production and Consumption, and SDG 2-Zero Hunger. ITC encourage global compliance using international standards, which are voluntary consensus, to ensure that the adherence to laws and regulations do not constitute a technical barrier to trade (TBT).

== Programmes/ Functions ==
=== National Platforms ===
There have been debates about the benefits of VSS adoption and the role that they can play in helping developing countries overcome trade barriers and drive sustainability in supply chains. Scepticism was centred around the concern that VSS might allow for discriminatory effects on small and medium-sized enterprises (SMEs), which play an even more crucial and dominant role in less industrialised economies. With criticism that private sector mulit-stakeholder initiatives (MSIs) adopt weak or narrow standards that better serve corporate interests than rights holder interests.

To proactively address these issues, the UNFSS runs the National Platforms in developing countries which can aid in facilitating a dialogue on a regular basis. The first National Platform on Private Sustainability Standards was launched in India in 2016. This multi-stakeholder platform was launched in conglomeration with Quality Council of India (QCI), under the auspices of the Ministry of Commerce and Industry, India, known as India National Platform on Private Sustainability Standards (INPPSS).

Between 2016 and 2018, Brazil, China and Mexico also developed their national platforms in addition to India. These platforms were mandated to serve as clearing houses for international exchanges, analytical work, collaborative action and the formulation of policy advisory. All of these platforms are involved in engaging in policy dialogue which further help address several challenges that SMEs face with regard to VSS, most importantly the awareness and substantive information.

Some of these activities make use of information instruments, such as knowledge creation through research and studies, knowledge sharing through web presence, and capacity development through workshops for smallholders and producers. Other activities use partnering instruments, such as the development of the platform itself, knowledge sharing through forums, and the promotion of standards for the achievement of the SDGs via interaction with government and intergovernmental organizations.

=== International Convention on Sustainable Trade and Standards (ICSTS) ===
In the recent years, with the increased focus on sustainable development, the VSS community has been growing rapidly and there is an evident market growth of these VSS. Multi-stakeholder engagement in dialogue, deliberation, and access to agenda-setting in this domain is attempted through the International Convention on Sustainable Trade and Standards (ICSTS). ICSTS aims to also establish and increase the awareness on the challenges and opportunities of VSS schemes. Till now, there have been two editions of the convention- one in India, in 2018, hosted by the Quality Council of India (QCI); and the second one in Brazil, in 2019, hosted by Brazilian Institute of Metrology, Quality and Technology (Inmetro), the Federation of Industries of the State of Rio de Janeiro (Firjan).

The ICSTS resulted into: • Engagement of more than 2000 participants over the course of the past conventions • Reached over 60 renowned international experts and high-level officials to speak at each of the convention • A space that allowed different local stakeholders to participate in advancing national priorities • An international dialogue that exchanges best practices of different countries • A network platform to bring together the private sector and standard setters • The convention has reached significant interests of high-level government officials • Media outreach that has attracted global attention, particularly through the dissemination via local UN offices and government bodies

=== Academic Advisory Council ===
The Academic Advisory Council (AAC) also another initiative spearheaded by the UNFSS and the Leuven Centre for Global Governance, supported by FWO and SECO. The AAC has been formulated to pursue the scientific objective of understanding the effectiveness of VSS and what determines it to be effective. VSS is an interdisciplinary/ trans-disciplinary subject, so the AAC aims to bring together these perspectives and create a network that enables better and critical understanding of the VSS. The AAC brings together an international mix of experts from a wide variety of academic backgrounds which enables to better understand the issues that VSS face and also address key challenges by applying a multi-sectoral and multi-disciplinary approach. In addition, it also tries to bring together researchers and practitioners and create dialogue and interaction that keeps in view both sides of the coin. In addition to meeting regularly, the AAC is also involved in holding roundtable discussions and webinars on topic that are key concerns in the domain of VSS.

=== VSS toolkit and Standards Map ===
UNCTAD launched a toolkit to guide the identification of the challenges and perceptions behind the adoption of a VSS scheme, and to explore policy options to address them. It is potentially useful for local, national or regional government agencies, the private sector, standard setters, non-governmental organizations (NGOs), international donors, academia and cooperatives. ITC created a Standard Map as an informational tool about voluntary sustainability standards (VSS), codes of conduct, audit protocols, reporting frameworks and company programs on sustainability. Within the standard profile, ITC provide the typology which explains if it is an international standard or a private standard e.g. the entity in charge is a private association or company.

== Publications ==
=== Flagship reports ===
One of the functions that UNFSS undertakes is the publication of twice-yearly flagship report on topic related to VSS and has done, till date, 4 publications (see below). The issues that the UNFSS tries to include through its flagship report are identified by VSS practitioners. The reports include information that might be relevant and useful for understanding issues related to opportunities and challenges of VSS for developing economies, producers and consumers. Policy makers and government officials can access the Flagship Reports through the UNFSS Member agencies and meetings, in particular, through UNCTAD as well as the 5 United Nations agencies. The Flagship Report is also often referred in UNCTAD’s Trade and Development Committee and expert meetings such as the NTMs week.

The four flagship publications are:

• In 2013, UNFSS published its 1st Flagship Report (Part 1 and Part 2). The report covered an array of salient VSS and public policy issues, and created an inventory of some of the primary initiatives working on VSS. The report explained the tensions regarding the link between VSS and public governance. • The 2nd Flagship Report, published in 2016, discusses the interaction between VSS and public governance and highlights optimal dynamics between public policy processes and VSS to ensure sustainability objectives are effectively met. The report also attempts to identify the economic, environmental and social benefits of VSS as well as the rationales for VSS engagement with the public sector. • In 2018, the 3rd Flagship Report, titled ‘VSS, Trade and the SDGs’, elucidates the understanding of VSS either as an enhancer or facilitator to global trade, studying the direct and indirect impacts of VSS to the economy. The report also includes a benchmarking analysis done to identify the links between VSS and the SDGs. • The 4th flagship published in 2020, studied the role of government through public procurement and trade policy in driving the adoption of VSS to achieve the SDGs and other public sustainability commitments.
