= Scientific Committee on Problems of the Environment =

- Abbreviation: SCOPE
- Formation: 1969; 57 years ago
- Type: INGO
- Region served: Worldwide
- Official language: English
- President: Jon Samseth
- Parent organization: International Council for Science (ICSU)
- Website: scope-environment.org

The Scientific Committee on Problems of the Environment (SCOPE) was established by the 10th meeting of the Executive Committee of the International Council for Science (ICSU) in 1969. SCOPE's members include 38 national science academies and research councils, and 22 international scientific unions. The current president is Jon Samseth (Norway). The secretariat is located in the Netherlands.

SCOPE exists primarily to develop scientific reviews of key environmental issues around the themes of managing societal and natural resources, ecosystem processes, and biodiversity, health and environment.

In 2012, SCOPE and Elsevier established a quarterly peer-reviewed academic journal, Environmental Development.

In 2019 SCOPE became an affiliated member of the International Science Council and in 2024 it became a full member.

== SCOPE-Zhongyu Environmental Awards ==
The SCOPE-Zhongyu Environmental Awards were introduced in 2010. They include three categories of annual Young Scientist awards (environmental sciences, environmental technologies, and environmental management). Every second year the Lifetime Achievements Award is given to two scientists with major contribution to the environmental sciences.

== SCOPE-Zhongyu Environmental Forum ==
The SCOPE-Zhongyu Environmental Forum is an annual event first organised in Yixing in 2011. It addresses current environmental issues, trying to bring scientists from different fields together with policy makers.

== United Nations ==
SCOPE has through the years developed a close collaboration with United Nations organizations, in particular UNESCO and UNEP. SCOPE is a major contributor to UNEP's yearbooks and publishes a policy brief series together with UNESCO and UNEP.

== Presidents ==
The following persons have been president of SCOPE:

- 2014- Jon Samseth (Norway)
- 2009-2014 Lu Yonglong (China)
- 2005-2009 Osvaldo E. Sala (United States)
- 1998-2005 J.M. Melillo (United States)
- 1995-1998 Ph. Bourdeau (Belgium)
- 1992-1995 J.W.B. Stewart (Canada)
- 1988-1992 F. di Castri (†) (France)
- 1985-1988 J.W.M. la Rivière (Netherlands)
- 1982-1985 R.O. Slatyer (Australia)
- 1976-1982 G.F. White (†) (USA)
- 1973-1976 V.A. Kovda (†) (USSR)
- 1969-1973 J.E. Smith (†), FRS (United Kingdom)
