= Jerry Melillo =

American professor of biology

- Born: 1943 (age 82–83)

Academic background
- Education: Wesleyan University; Yale University

Jerry Michael Melillo (born 1943) is a Distinguished Scientist at the Marine Biological Laboratory and a professor of biology at Brown University. In 2014, he was elected a member of the National Academy of Sciences. From 1998 to 2005 he was president of SCOPE.

Melillo attended Wesleyan University and Yale University.
