= Transnational environmental policy =

Global environmental policy

Transnational environmental policies are efforts to confront global environmental issues such as climate change, ozone depletion, or marine pollution. Environmental policies are transnational when they include actors from at least two sovereign states. As of 2018, more than 1,800 multilateral environmental agreements are in effect.

== History ==
Since World War II, environmental policies have shifted focus from local or discrete issues like loss of biodiversity or pollution to global environmental topics. The post-war economic expansion also created environmental damage, which in turn led to modern environmentalism and the first Earth Day in 1970. The 1972 United Nations Conference on the Human Environment in Stockholm marked "the emergence of what has become a large and complex set of environmental regimes", and "the beginning of international environmental law and policy." Major conferences regarding climate change occurred in the 1970s and 1980s, with the first World Climate Conference in 1979, and the World Conference on the Changing Atmosphere in 1988; the latter resulted in the world's first ambitious targets and timetables for the reduction of greenhouse gas emissions.

As of 2018, more than 1,800 multilateral environmental agreements are in effect. Of these, more than 190 address climate change, consisting of 12,000 sub-state and non-state actors.

== Actors ==
=== International organizations ===
International organizations are organizations established by treaties, which are governed by international law and have their own legal personalities. They both create international law and are subject to it. Examples of international organizations with a focus in environmental policy include the International Union for Conservation of Nature and the United Nations Environment Programme.

=== Non-governmental organizations (NGOs) ===
Transnational environmental NGOs (TENGOs) are environmental NGOs with a broad geographic scope. Examples of TENGOs include World Wide Fund for Nature, Natural Resources Defense Council, Conservation International, The Nature Conservancy, and the World Resources Institute. One way TENGOs create environmental change is through market-based certification programs, which have been enacted in sectors including ecotourism, forestry, fishing, and fair trade. One of the most successful and visible of these programs is the Forest Stewardship Council, which has served as a model for other certification programs. Other popular certification programs include the dolphin safe label and Marine Stewardship Council.
