= World Standards Cooperation =

Alliance of stardardization organizations

- Abbreviation: WSC
- Formation: 2001
- Founders: IEC, ISO and ITU
- Founded at: Switzerland
- Type: NGO, supraorganization
- Website: www.worldstandardscooperation.org

World Standards Cooperation (WSC) is an alliance of the IEC, ISO and ITU international standardization organizations with the objective to advance the voluntary consensus-based International Standards system. It was formed in 2001.

The collaboration under WSC is intended to avoid duplication of efforts, promote consistency, and facilitate the interoperability of standards across different sectors. The organizations share information and coordinate their activities to address emerging challenges and technological advancements in a rapidly evolving global landscape.

The WSC has played a crucial role in the development and maintenance of thousands of international standards across various sectors, ensuring consistency and interoperability on a global scale. Through the development of standards, the WSC has contributed to the promotion of innovation by providing a framework for the adoption of new technologies and best practices worldwide. International standards developed under the WSC help facilitate global trade by providing a common set of rules and specifications that businesses and industries can adhere to, ensuring product compatibility and quality. WSC activities have led to the harmonization of technical specifications, reducing trade barriers and promoting fair competition in the global marketplace. The standards developed by the participating organizations contribute to enhancing the safety, quality, and reliability of products, services, and systems across various industries. WSC has been involved in addressing emerging technologies and challenges, such as those related to information and communication technologies (ICTs), renewable energy, and sustainability.

== International Electrotechnical Commission ==
The IEC, one of the organizations within the WSC, has been actively involved in developing international standards for smart grids. Smart grids integrate advanced communication and information technologies into traditional power grids to enhance efficiency, reliability, and sustainability.

IEC standards, such as those in the IEC 61850 series, address the interoperability and communication requirements for substation automation within smart grids. These standards help utilities and manufacturers develop systems that can seamlessly communicate and operate across different equipment and devices, leading to more efficient and reliable energy distribution.

The collaboration within the WSC ensures that these standards align with broader international efforts to create a consistent framework for smart grid implementation. By establishing common guidelines, the IEC, along with ISO and ITU, contributes to the global development and deployment of smart grid technologies, promoting energy efficiency and sustainability on a worldwide scale.
