= Jon Samseth =

Norwegian physicist

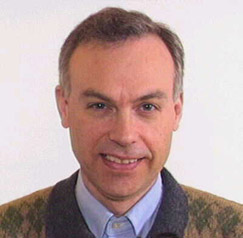
- Born: July 23, 1954 (age 72); Trondheim, Norway
- Occupation: Professor
- Employer(s): Oslo Metropolitan University, SINTEF

Jon Samseth, born July 23, 1954, in Trondheim, Norway, is a Norwegian engineer and professor of physics. He was awarded an engineering degree in physics (siv.ing.) from the Norwegian Institute of Technology (NTH) (now Norwegian University of Science and Technology, NTNU) in 1981. He later earned a Diplôme d'ingénieur degree in Petroleum economics from the École Nationale Supérieure du Pétrole et des Moteurs (ENSPM) in France in 1983. He received his PhD in physics from the Massachusetts Institute of Technology (MIT) in 1988. Samseth is a professor of energy physics at the Oslo Metropolitan University as well as a scientific advisor to SINTEF industry. In addition, he served as an adjunct professor (professor II) in the Department of Chemical engineering at NTNU from 2007 to 2015.

Samseth has focused his research broadly in the field of soft matter. Within this field, he has used neutron scattering to study a variety of surfactant-containing systems, including micelles and microemulsions, aerogels and block-copolymers. Since 2004 he has been engaged in the study of nanostructured polymer-membranes applied to gas separation.

Samseth has been actively involved internationally through the International Union of Pure and Applied Physics (IUPAP). He was member of IUPAP’s first energy working group in which they assessed viability of various energy sources. In 2012, IUPAP commissioned him to chair and form a new working group devoted to energy topics at large. He was also a member of the Scientific Committee on Problems of the Environment's (SCOPE) biofuels rapid assessment group and has been the president of SCOPE since 2014. From 2010 to 2013 he has been a scientific advisor to the yearbook team of UNEP (United Nations Environment Programme) and participated as a member of the writing team. In the 2012 yearbook, he was responsible for the chapter on the decommissioning of nuclear reactors.

Currently, Samseth is actively involved in the public debate on energy issues, most notably those related to nuclear energy, and gives public lectures on these topics as well. He raises ethical and environmental concerns connected to energy issues and advocates that nuclear energy is an integral part of a modern energy system. Because of his experience in energy topics, he is frequently featured in the media, particularly when nuclear energy concerns the public (such as during the Fukushima accident in Japan.)

In 2012 professor Samseth was elected member of the Norwegian Academy of Technological Sciences (NTVA).
