= Environmental audit privilege =

Environmental audit privilege, or environmental privilege, in United States environmental law, is an evidentiary privilege created under state statute. The privilege protects the results of companies' internal environmental compliance audits from disclosure at trial, or in pretrial discovery.

The environmental audit privilege is meant to incentivize companies to evaluate their own compliance with environmental regulations. Proponents of such laws further argue that it is necessary to encourage such self-evaluations, because regulatory agencies lack the resources to police all the polluters in their jurisdiction.

Environmental audit privilege statutes have been promoted by the conservative American Legislative Exchange Council, which circulates a model statute known as the "Uniform State Environmental Audit Privilege Act". However, most state environmental privilege laws are non-uniform, and vary greatly in their scope, exceptions and effect.

The United States Environmental Protection Agency (EPA) has been skeptical of state environmental audit privilege laws, and generally requires that states limit the privilege's effect so as not to interfere with federal investigations. These concerns were heightened by the question of whether these laws would apply to state government agencies to which the EPA delegated its enforcement authority under federal law. Accordingly, in the past, the EPA has used its statutory powers in the delegation of EPA enforcement authority to discourage states from adopting excessively powerful environmental audit privilege laws.

Some states do not recognize environmental audit privilege, but do provide immunity from civil penalties for the results of internal compliance audits. These states include Minnesota, New Jersey, and Rhode Island.

== See also ==
- Environmental privilege
