= Sustainability standards and certification =

Voluntary guidelines to show good practices

Sustainability standards and certifications are voluntary guidelines used by producers, manufacturers, traders, retailers, and service providers to demonstrate their commitment to good environmental, social, ethical, and food safety practices. There are over 400 such standards across the world.

The trend started in the late 1980s and 1990s with the introduction of Ecolabels and standards for organic food and other products. Most standards refer to the triple bottom line of environmental quality, social equity, and economic prosperity. A standard is normally developed by a broad range of stakeholders and experts in a particular sector and includes a set of practices or criteria for how a crop should be sustainably grown or a resource should be ethically harvested.

This might cover, for instance, responsible fishing practices that do not endanger marine biodiversity or respect for human rights, and the payment of fair wages on a coffee or tea plantation. Normally sustainability standards are accompanied by a verification process – often referred to as "certification" – to evaluate that an enterprise complies with a standard, as well as a traceability process for certified products to be sold along the supply chain, often resulting in a consumer-facing label.

Certification programs also focus on capacity building and working with partners and other organizations to support smallholders or disadvantaged producers to make the social and environmental improvements needed to meet the standard.

The basic premise of sustainability standards is two-fold:

1. Weak legislation and strong demand for action: Sustainability standards emerged in areas where weak national and global legislation existed but where the consumer and NGO movements around the globe demanded action. For example, campaigns by Global Exchange and other NGOs against the purchase of goods from "sweatshop" factories by companies like Nike, Inc., Levi Strauss & Co., and other leading brands led to the emergence of social welfare standards like the SA8000 and others.
2. Environmental Merits - Leading brands who sold to both consumers and to the B2B supply chain, and wished to demonstrate the environmental or organic merits of their products led to the emergence of hundreds of eco-labels, organic and other standards.

A leading example of a consumer standard is the Fairtrade movement, administered by FLO International and exhibiting huge sales growth around the world for ethically sourced produce. An example of a B2B standard that has grown tremendously in the last few years is the Forest Stewardship Council's standard (FSC) for forest products made from sustainably harvested trees.

The line between consumer and B2B sustainability standards is becoming blurred, with leading trade buyers increasingly demanding Fairtrade certification, for example, and consumers increasingly recognizing the FSC mark. In recent years, the business-to-business focus of sustainability standards has risen as it has become clear that consumer demand alone cannot drive the transformation of major sectors and industries. In commodities such as palm oil, soy, farmed seafood, and sugar, certification initiatives are targeting the mainstream adoption of better practices and pre-competitive industry collaboration. Major brands and retailers are also starting to make commitments to certification in their whole supply chain or product offering, rather than a single product line or ingredient.

The number of Sustainability Standards has continued to grow; currently, there are around 264 active VSS (according to the International Trade Center Standards Map) in 194 countries and 15 sectors, and about 457 ecolabels (according to Ecolabel Index) in 199 countries, and 25 industry sectors.

== International and private standards supporting sustainability ==
Sustainability standards can be categorized as either voluntary consensus standards or private standards. International Organization for Standardization (ISO) is an example of an standards organization who develop international standards following a voluntary consensus process for sustainability under Technical Committee 207, Environmental management and Technical Committee 268, Sustainable cities and communities. These Committees connect with Technical Committee 61, Plastics working on mandates such standards for eliminating plastic pollution. In September 2023, ISO and the United Nations Development Programme (UNDP) signed a Statement of Intent, as a joint commitment to the role of International Standards in addressing sustainability.

Many of the international standards developed to help guide sustainability goals and certification schemes originate from the United Nations Food and Agriculture Organization (FAO). The FAO has promulgated several standards for certifying bodies to adhere to. In particular, the FAO has issued guidelines and standards designed to make agriculture, fisheries, and forestry more sustainable.

Some of the sustainability standards were initiated by social movements in particular countries, such as Rainforest Alliance in the United States and Fairtrade certification in the Netherlands. Standards were initiated by individual companies, using private standards, such as Utz Certified (Ahold), C.A.F.E. Practices (Starbucks), and Nespresso AAA (Nespresso).

With the objective of standard harmonization, some standards were launched by coalitions of private firms (also referred to as multistakeholder governance, development agencies, NGOs, and other stakeholders, such as the Marine Stewardship Council, or MSC standard, developed as a collaboration between Unilever and the World Wildlife Fund. For example, the Common Code for the Coffee Community (4C) was initiated by an alliance of large American coffee roasters, including Kraft Foods, Sara Lee, and Nestle, assisted by the German Agency for Technical Cooperation and Development (GIZ).

One important facilitator of the development of most global standards was a series of local development projects involving NGOs, coffee roasters, and producers in different developing countries. For example, the Fairtrade private standard was developed based on pilot projects with Mexican farmers. 4C builds on development projects in Peru, Colombia, and Vietnam, involving GIZ, major coffee roasters, and local producers.

The most widely established and adopted standards are in agriculture, with 40% of global coffee production certified to one of the main schemes, and approximately 15–20% of cocoa and tea production being compliant with major international standards. Forestry and wild seafood are also sectors in which standards have been influential, with certified production pushing past 10% of the global share. Cotton, palm oil, soy, biofuels and farmed seafood are some of the commodities in which certification is growing the fastest, due in part to major roundtables that have been set up to bring the whole industry together. More recently, standards have started to emerge for mining and the extraction of metals – including gold, silver, aluminium, and oil and gas – as well as for cattle, electronics, plastics and tourism.

Evidence suggests that Corporate Social Responsibility (CSR) adopted willingly by firms can be more effective than government-regulated CSR so global standards by private companies show promise for effective social impact. Counter-arguments are discussed which express concerns around private sector, corporation-led, multistakeholder governance who adopt "weak or narrow standards" that "better serve corporate interests than rights holder interests" for self-regulation in the absence of government regulation.

The creation of the ISEAL Alliance as a private organization in 2002 was the first collaborative effort amongst a group of sustainability standards organizations to agree to follow common good practices for harmonized standards implementation and also to work together to drive up the use of private standards and certification globally. In 2022, ISEAL reported 42% of their funding came from government grants. With generous support from organizations such as The Walmart Foundation, Fairtrade USA and Rainforest Alliance.

== Sustainability standards ==
Numerous sustainability standards have been developed to address issues of environmental quality, social equity, and economic prosperity in global production and trade practices. Despite similarities in major goals and certification procedures, there are some significant differences in terms of their historical development, target groups of adopters, geographical diffusion, and emphasis on environmental, social, or economic issues. Recent academic research has also examined individual certification schemes within the broader ecosystem of sustainability standards, including B Corp certification, highlighting both their potential benefits and ongoing debates about their effectiveness and governance.

One of the major differences is based on the level of strictness of the standard. Some standards set the bar high for a sector, promoting strong social and environmental practices and working with the top performers to constantly push up sustainability expectations. Other standards are more focused on eliminating the worst practices and operate at more of an entry level to get a large proportion of an industry working incrementally towards better practices. Often there are strategies between standards to move producers along this performance ladder of sustainability Another important distinction is that some standards can be applied internationally (usually with mechanisms to ensure local relevance and appropriateness), in contrast other standards are developed entirely with a regional or national focus.

Additional differences between standards might relate to the certification process and whether it is conducted by a first, second or third party; the traceability system in place and whether it allows for the segregation or mixing of certified and non-certified materials; and the types of sustainability claims that are made on products.

=== Fairtrade ===
The Fairtrade label was developed in the late 1980s by a Dutch development agency in collaboration with Mexican farmers. The initiative performs development work and promotes its political vision of an alternative economy, seeing its main objective in empowering small producers and providing these with access to and improving their position on global markets.

The most distinguishing feature of the Fairtrade label is the guarantee of a minimum price and a social premium that goes to the cooperative and not to the producers directly. Recently, Fairtrade also adopted environmental objectives as part of their certification system.

In 2020, Fairtrade International issued a position statement, defending their use of private standards, in response to a report from The Institute for Multi-Stakeholder Initiative Integrity (MSI Integrity).

=== Rainforest Alliance ===
The Rainforest Alliance was created in the late 1980s from a social movement and is committed to conserving rainforests and their biodiversity. One key element of the standard is the compulsory elaboration and implementation of a detailed plan for the development of a sustainable farm management system to assist wildlife conservation.

Another objective is to improve workers' welfare by establishing and securing sustainable livelihoods. Producer prices may carry a premium. Yet instead of guaranteeing a fixed floor price, the standard seeks to improve the economic situation of producers through higher yields and enhanced cost efficiency.

=== UTZ Certified ===
UTZ Certified (formerly Utz Kapeh) was co-founded by the Dutch coffee roaster Ahold Coffee Company in 1997. It aims to create an open and transparent marketplace for socially and environmentally responsible agricultural products. Instruments include the UTZ Traceability System and the UTZ Code of Conduct.

The traceability system makes certified products traceable from producer to final buyer and has stringent chains of custody requirements. The UTZ Code of Conduct emphasizes both environmental practices (e.g. biodiversity conservation, waste handling, and water use) and social benefits (e.g. access to medical care, access to sanitary facilities at work).

=== Organic ===
The Organic standard was developed in the 1970s and is based on IFOAM Basic Standards. IFOAM stands for International Federation of Organic Agriculture Movements and is the leading global umbrella organization for the organic farming movement. The IFOAM Basic Standards provide a framework of minimum requirements, including the omission of agrochemicals such as pesticides and chemical-synthetic fertilizers. The use of animal feeds is also strictly regulated. Genetic engineering and the use of genetically modified organisms (GMOs) are forbidden.

=== Sustainable Tourism ===
With increasing awareness, The tourism industry has a variety of sustainability standards for different subsectors. This includes standards for sustainable hotels, sustainable tour operators, sustainable events and conferences, sustainable destinations, and so on.

=== LEED ===
The Leadership in Energy and Environmental Design standards were developed by the US Green Building Council in an effort to propel green building design in the United States. LEED certification can be attained through "compliance with all environmental laws and regulations, occupancy scenarios, building permanence and pre-rating completion, site boundaries and area-to-site ratios, and obligatory five-year sharing of whole building energy and water use data from the start of occupancy (for new construction) or date of certification (for existing buildings)".

=== Other examples ===
Other types of standards include sector-specific schemes such as the Roundtable on Sustainable Palm Oil (RSPO); standards for climate and development interventions like the Gold Standard, retailer-led sustainability certification initiatives such as GlobalGAP; Corporate own-brand sustainability initiatives such as Starbucks' C.A.F.E. Practices; and national programs such as the Irish Food Board's 'Origin Green' scheme.

The United Nations Forum on Sustainability Standards (UNFSS) is a joint initiative of FAO, UNEP, ITC, UNCTAD, and UNIDO on Sustainability Standards. UNFSS is a neutral and credible platform to maximize the potential of Voluntary Sustainability Standards (VSS) as a means to achieve Sustainable Development Goals (SDGs) through: Facilitating emerging economies' access to lucrative markets, stimulating well-informed dialogue among key stakeholders at the national and international level, and building capacities for producers and SMEs, to enhance opportunities in international trade.

== See also ==
- Certification
- Circles of Sustainability
- Ecolabel
- Harmonization (standards)
- List of sustainability topics
- International Standard
- Standards organization
- Sustainability
- Sustainable development
- Sustainable sourcing
- Technical Standard
- United Nations Forum on Sustainability Standards

== Recommended readings ==
- Baue, Bill (2023). "The Lost Decade: Sustainability Standards Sabotage Sustainability". R3.0 (Redesign for Resilience & Regeneration).
- Blackmore, Emma; Keeley, James; Pyburn, Rhiannon; Mangus, Ellen; Chen, Lu; Yuhui, Qiao (March 2012). Pro-poor certification: Assessing the benefits of sustainability certification for small-scale farmers in Asia. IIED. ISBN 978-1-84369-843-2.
- Brunsson, N.; Rasche, A.; Seidl, D. (2012). "The Dynamics of Standardisation: Three Perspectives on Standards in Organization Studies" (PDF). Organization Studies. 33 (5–6): 613–633. doi:10.1177/0170840612450120. S2CID 45252880. SSRN 2089976.
- Gilbert, D.U.; Rasche, A.; Waddock, S. (2011). "Accountability in a Global Economy: The Emergence of International Accountability Standards". Business Ethics Quarterly. 21 (1): 23–44. doi:10.5840/beq20112112. S2CID 43387391. SSRN 1709011.
- Gilbert, D.U.; Rasche, A. (2007). "Discourse Ethics and Social Accountability: The Ethics of SA 8000". Business Ethics Quarterly. 17 (2): 187–216. doi:10.5840/beq200717230. S2CID 145330990. SSRN 1652151.
- Giovannucci, Daniele (2001). "Sustainable Coffee Survey of the North American Specialty Coffee Industry".
- Giovannucci, Daniele; Potts, Jason; Killian, B.; Wunderlich, C.; Schuller, S.; Soto, G.; Schroeder, K.; Vagneron, I.; Pinard, F. (2008). "Seeking Sustainability: COSA preliminary analysis of sustainability initiatives in the coffee sector". SSRN 1338582.
- Gulbrandsen, Lars H. (July 2008). "Accountability Arrangements in Non-State Standards Organizations: Instrumental Design and Imitation". Organization. 15 (4): 563–583. doi:10.1177/1350508408091007. S2CID 145407056.
- Hardyment, Richard (April 2024). Measuring Good Business: Making Sense of Environmental, Social and Governance Data. Routledge. ISBN 978-1-032-60119-9.
- Kolk, Ans (April 2005). "Corporate Social Responsibility in the Coffee Sector". European Management Journal. 23 (2): 228–236. doi:10.1016/j.emj.2005.02.003.
- Manning, S.; Boons, F.; Von Hagen, O.; Reinecke, J (2012). "National Contexts Matter: The Co-Evolution of Sustainability Standards in Global Value Chains" (PDF). Ecological Economics. 83: 197–209. Bibcode:2012EcoEc..83..197M. doi:10.1016/j.ecolecon.2011.08.029. S2CID 54715286. SSRN 1752655.
- Manning, S.; von Hagen, O (2010). "Linking Local Experiments to Global Standards: How Project Networks Promote Global Institution-Building" (PDF). Scandinavian Journal of Management. 26 (4): 398–416. doi:10.1016/j.scaman.2010.09.003. S2CID 144234235. SSRN 1668888.
- Muradian, Roldan; Pelupessy, Wim (December 2005). "Governing the coffee chain: The role of voluntary regulatory Systems". World Development. 33 (12): 2029–2044. Bibcode:2005WoDev..33.2029M. doi:10.1016/j.worlddev.2005.06.007.
- Rasche, A. (2012). "Global Policies and Local Practice: Loose and Tight Couplings in Multi-Stakeholder Initiatives". Business Ethics Quarterly. 22 (4): 679–708. doi:10.5840/beq201222444. S2CID 144816840. SSRN 2129694.
- Rasche, A. (2010). "Collaborative Governance 2.0". Corporate Governance. 10 (4): 500–511. doi:10.1108/14720701011069713. S2CID 154959736. SSRN 1684763.
- Rasche, A. (2009). "Toward a Model to Compare and Analyze Accountability Standards". Corporate Social Responsibility and Environmental Management. 16 (4): 192–205. doi:10.1002/csr.202. S2CID 62898416. SSRN 1658503.
- Reinecke, J. (2010). "Beyond a subjective theory of value and towards a 'fair price': an organizational perspective on Fairtrade minimum price setting". Organization. 17 (5): 1–19. doi:10.1177/1350508410372622. S2CID 145741555.
- Reinecke, J.; Manning, S.; Von Hagen, O (2012). "The Emergence of a Standards Market: Multiplicity of Sustainability Standards in the Global Coffee Industry" (PDF). Organization Studies. 33 (5/6): 789–812. doi:10.1177/0170840612443629. S2CID 38006629. SSRN 1970343.
- Vogt, M. (2019). Variance in approach to a sustainable coffee industry in Costa Rica perspectives from within: lessons and insights. Ubiquity Press. doi:10.5334/bce. ISBN 978-1-911529-76-7.
