= Independent forest monitoring =

Independent forest monitoring (IFM) is a tool for assessing and strengthening legal compliance in the forest sector internationally. By complementing official forest law enforcement activities with the objectivity and public credibility of an independent third party, IFM can improve transparency in the short term while contributing to the development of a sound legislative and regulatory framework for responsible forest management.

Transparency was emphasized as a key element in Reducing Emissions from Deforestation and forest Degradation (REDD) by the UN Framework Convention on Climate Change (UNFCCC) at the Conference of the Parties (COP-15) in Copenhagen in December 2009 in its decisions on methodological guidance for forest monitoring systems.

== Principles ==
IFM has been defined by Global Witness as “the use of an independent third party that, by agreement with state authorities, provides an assessment of legal compliance, and observation of and guidance on official forest law enforcement systems.”

IFM centres around the establishment of a partnership between an official ‘host institution’ responsible for oversight of the forest sector and an appointed monitoring organisation. The monitor's principal activity is to conduct field investigations to observe the work of the official law enforcement agency and to document illegal activity in the forest and related trade. These investigations result in the publication of authoritative information on forest operations, which is made widely available to all levels of government, industry, and civil society.

By monitoring official forest law enforcement, IFM enables mechanisms of illegal activity and corruption to be identified. Monitors expect their evidence to be acted on and will pro-actively guard against entrenched resistance to improved governance.

== Use ==
IFM has been undertaken in Cambodia, Cameroon, Republic of Congo, Honduras, and Nicaragua, and piloted in many other countries.

IFM has also been called Independent Monitoring, Independent Observation, and Third Party Observation.
