= Environmental Development =

- Discipline: Environmental science, environmental policy
- Language: English
- Edited by: Eleanor Milne

Publication details
- History: 2012-present
- Publisher: Elsevier
- Frequency: Quarterly

Standard abbreviations
- ISO 4: Environ. Dev.

Indexing
- ISSN: 2211-4645
- LCCN: 2015205288
- OCLC no.: 778327918

Links
- Journal homepage; Online archive

Environmental Development is a quarterly peer-reviewed academic journal covering environmental science and policy published by Elsevier. In January 2018, Natarajan Ishwaran became the new editor-in-chief. He succeeded Eleanor Milne (Colorado State University, now Subject Editor for Climate Change) EIC from July 2015. The founding editor was Theo Beckers (Tilburg University).

The journal is associated with the Scientific Committee on Problems of the Environment (SCOPE) and is abstracted and indexed in the Emerging Sources Citation Index and Scopus.
