= Robin Wood (environmental organisation) =

- Founded: 12 November 1982
- Type: Non-governmental organization
- Purpose: Non-violent action group for nature and Environmentalism
- Headquarters: Hamburg
- Location: Bremen, Germany
- Region served: Germany
- Method: Direct action
- Members: 4000
- Key people: Florian Kubitz (CEO), Julian Smaluhn (Chair)
- Revenue: €932,000
- Website: www.robinwood.de

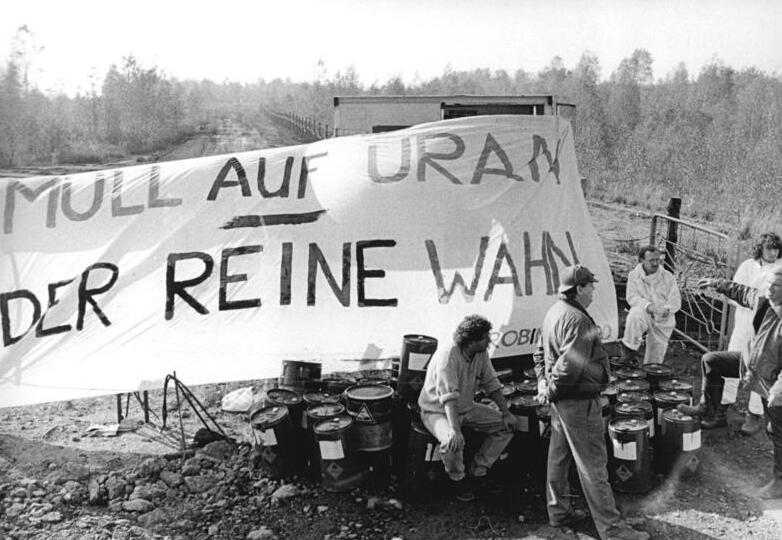
Blockade of the Lichtenberg landfill site on the former uranium mining area of Wismut AG, 1990

Robin Wood is based in Bremen and, in 2008, was composed of fifteen mostly autonomous regional groups within Germany.

Initially concerned with the conservation of German forests, particularly the Black Forest, the group's activism efforts later expanded to include rainforest conservation, paper recycling, reduction of acid rain and other related areas. Robin Wood stages "attention-grabbing" demonstrations and confrontational public protests to raise awareness. Although peaceful, the demonstrations are described as "often illegal." The group publishes the quarterly Robin Wood Magazin.

== History ==
Robin Wood is a German environmental advocacy group. The group was founded in 1982 by former members of Greenpeace who desired a decentralized grassroots organization with greater autonomy to address specific local German issues. The name is based on the character of Robin Hood: instead of Robin Hood as the 'avenger of the disinherited', Robin Wood described itself as the 'avenger of the defoliated'. In order to focus more on the issues of forest dieback and acid rain, they left Greenpeace at that time. Over time, other issues were added, so that Robin Wood is now divided into three specialist departments: Forest, Tropical Forests and Mobility. Robin Wood sees itself as a grassroots democratic, non-violent action group.

On 21 November 2010, two activists from the environmental organisation were ordered to pay a total of €8,450 for blocking railway tracks. The Stralsund public prosecutor's office had launched an investigation against the two anti-nuclear activists for dangerous interference with public rail transport. As there is no legal basis for charging the costs, the Schleswig Administrative Court overturned the corresponding fee notices issued by the Bad Bramstedt Federal Police Headquarters on 17 December 2013.

== Organisation ==
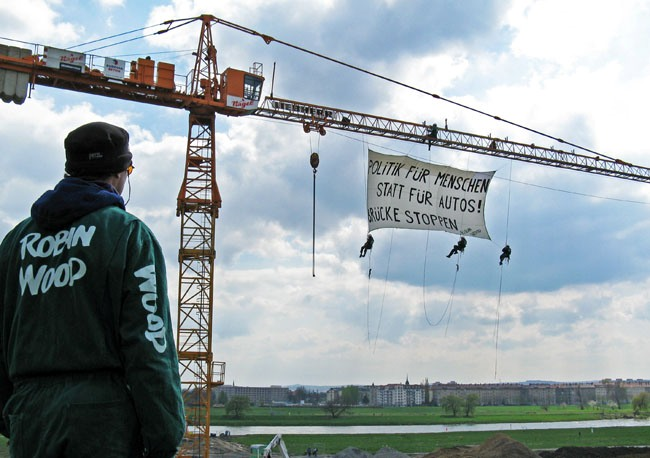
Crane upation against the Waldschlösschenbrücke in Dresden

The association is recognised as a non-profit organisation and is largely financed by donations and membership fees. It has around 1,400 voting members and around 3,500 supporting members in Germany. There are currently regional groups of varying sizes and activity levels in around nine cities and regions.

In 2022, Robin Wood was financed by around 80% donations and only 6% membership fees, with a total income of around €974,000. Expenditure is dominated by the costs of press and public relations (32%) and campaigns (20%).

Robin Wood is a member of the German Nature Conservation Ring.

== Actions and campaigns ==
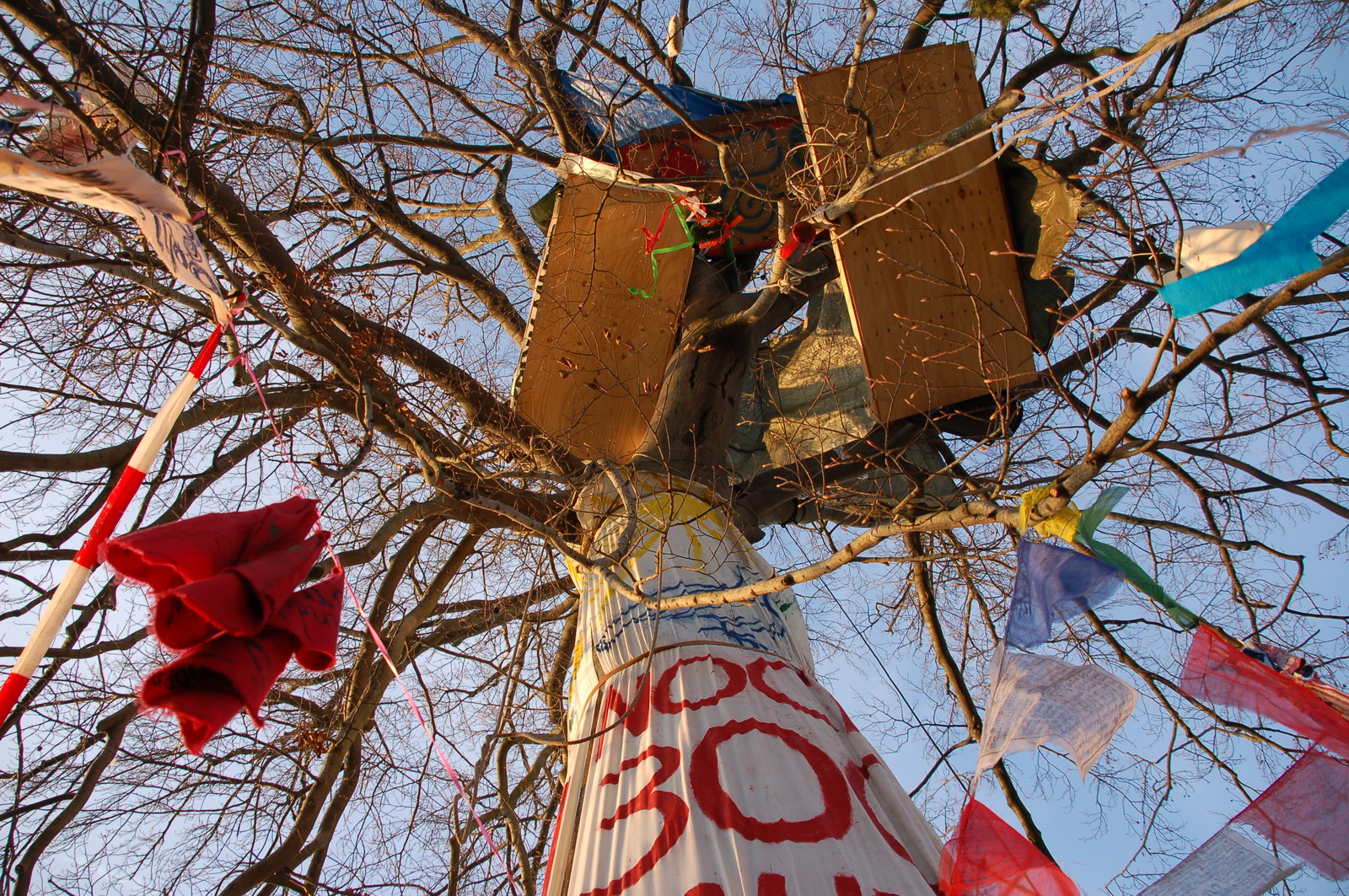
Tree occupation against the Waldschlösschenbrücke in Dresden

The association's work focuses on measures to improve the criticised conditions in nature through specific forms of public relations. Robin Wood attempts to raise awareness of what it considers to be the most pressing ecological problems through non-violent actions.

These actions include protests, such as climbing or occupying buildings and displaying banners, as well as environmental education at public events or in schools. In addition, research and publications are published, and the ROBIN-WOOD magazine is issued quarterly. Current issues are presented on a self-built raft that has been travelling around Germany in recent years. In 2021, a raft tour from Berlin to Hamburg took place under the motto With tailwind for a real energy transition.

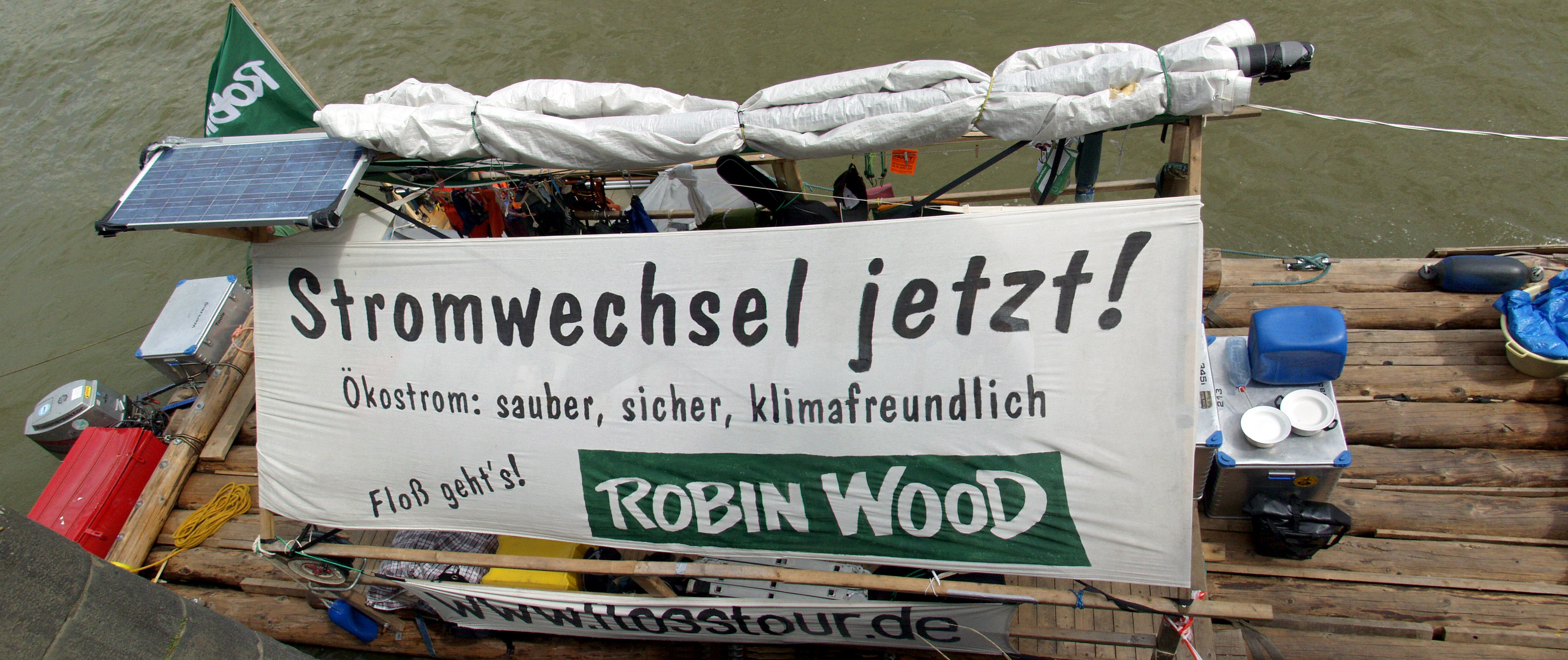
Robin Wood raft anchored on the Rhine in Cologne during their campaign 'Stromwechsel jetzt! Floß geht's!' (Electricity change now! Let's go!), 2007

In 2009, Robin Wood ended its membership of FSC International in protest and limited itself to cooperation and membership of the FSC working group in Germany. The association also ran a campaign against disposable cups under the slogan 'Avengers of the cups – forest protection instead of disposable cups'. Protests against coal-fired power generation were also an issue that was accompanied by campaigns. Other issues include uranium transports through Germany and fracking.

Robin Wood spoke out against the privatisation of Deutsche Bahn AG and the extensive subsidisation of air traffic.
