= Harmonization (standards) =

Unification of conflicting standards

Harmonization is the process of minimizing redundant or conflicting standards which may have evolved independently. The name is also an analogy to the process to harmonizing discordant music.

Harmonization is different from standardization. Harmonization involves a reduction in variation of standards, while standardization entails moving towards the eradication of any variation with the adoption of a single standard. The goal for standard harmonization is to find commonalities, identify critical requirements that need to be retained, and provide a common framework for standards setting organizations (SSOs) to adopt. In some instances, businesses come together forming alliances or coalitions, also referred to multi-stakeholder initiatives (MSIs) with a belief that harmonization could reduce compliance costs and simplify the process of meeting requirements. With potential to reduce complexity for those tasked with testing and auditing standards for compliance.

== Harmonization in the Public Sector ==
A harmonised standard is a European standard developed by a recognised European Standards Organisation: European Committee for Standardization (CEN), European Committee for Electrotechnical Standardization (CENELEC), or European Telecommunications Standards Institute (ETSI). It is created following a request from the European Commission to one of these organisations. Harmonised standards must be published in the Official Journal of the European Union (OJEU).

In the information and communication technologies (ICTs) sector, companies initially formed closed groups to develop private standards, for reasons which included competitive advantage. An example being the phrase "embrace, extend, and extinguish" used internally by Microsoft which led to legal action taken by United States Department of Justice. In response, governments and intergovernmental organizations (IGOs) recommended the use of international standards which resulted in standard harmonization. Examples include the Linux operating system, Adobe portable document format (PDF) and the OASIS open document format (ODF) being converted into ISO and IEC international standards. In 2022, EU legislation was passed for all mobile phones, tablets and cameras sold in the EU requiring a USB-C charging port by 2024. The USB Type-C Specification is an IEC international standard, IEC 62680-1-3. This was reaffirmed at the G7 Hiroshima Summit 2023, where cooperating on international standards setting with a commitment to collectively support the development of open, voluntary and consensus-based standards that will shape the next generation of technology.

Harmonization of regulatory standards is seen by economists as a key component in reducing trade costs and increasing interstate trade. Where importing-market standards are harmonized with international standards, such as those from ISO or IEC, the negative effect on developing-country exporters is substantially lessened, or even reversed. The US government Office of Management and Budget published CircularA-119 instructing its agencies to adopt voluntary consensus standards before relying upon private standards. The circular mandates standard harmonization by eliminating or reducing US agency use of private standards and government standards. The priority for governments to adopt voluntary consensus standards is supported by international standards such as ISO supporting public policy initiatives. An example is regulators creating the International Medical Devices Regulatory Forum (IMDRF) and promoting the Medical Devices Single Audit Program (MDSAP). This uses an international standard, ISO 13485 Medical devices — Quality management systems — Requirements for regulatory purposes. World Bank Group explain that private standards cannot be used in technical regulation and have to be moved into the public standardization system before they can be used as the basis for technical regulations.

== Harmonization in the Private Sector ==
In comparison to the public sector, where governments, IGOs and regulators work towards a harmonised standard, there are instances where private sector promote harmonization of multiple standards. An example is the private organization ISEAL Alliance accepting multiple schemes as community members using private standards who commit to their code of good practice. Another example is the Global Food Safety Initiative which is a private organization that promotes harmonization using a benchmarking process that results in recognition of multiple scheme owners using private standards. The harmonization approach for multiple private standards has led to criticism from various organizations including the Institute for Multi-Stakeholder Initiative Integrity and The International Food and Agribusiness Management Review.

For food safety, a single international standard, ISO 22000, was proposed in 2007 and 2020 as a harmonized standard approach used by the public sector. On both occasions, the Global Food Safety Initiative rejected the proposal because promoting ISO 22000 would mean reducing the power of global retailers in terms of control over standards.

Private corporations are not allowed to be members or have voting rights over international standards, because they are consensus-based. Whereas it is possible to have a controlling interest and exert influence if they promote private standards because they are non-consensus. In the environmental sector for "net zero", corporations continue to promote private standards over international standards. This allows the creation of new terms that are non-consensus and do not follow terms which are defined in international standards such as ISO 14050 Environmental management Vocabulary. An example is the term "insetting" that has been introduced by the private sector, despite it not being part of IWA 42 Net Zero Guidelines. This approach is an obstacle to standard harmonization and received criticism from the New Climate Institute (NCI), where companies are successfully lobbying the standards setting organizations who use private standards to rubber-stamp the inclusion of insetting claims within their net zero pledges. Another example of corporate lobbying of a standards setter relates to the Science Based Targets initiative (SBTi). One of their funders, the Bezos Earth Fund exerted influence on SBTi to relax their position on carbon offsets. This resulted in an open letter from SBTi staff to the Board of Trustees disagreeing with the decision. Standards setting organizations who do not follow a consensus model or the WTO principles for international standards development are vulnerable to corporate lobbying, especially when they are receiving funding from the private sector.

In the sustainability sector, the ITC created a Standard Map as an informational tool in an attempt to harmonize and group together voluntary sustainability standards (VSSs). With over 300 sustainability standards mapped, and financial opportunities with fees that are associated to private standards, this may have led to a perverse incentive. The unintended consequence being a proliferation of private standards, some of which could be primarily seeking monetary gain and may have sabotaged sustainability standards and certification.

== Harmonization vs Standardization ==
To avoid harmonization failures like plugs and sockets, video cassettes and keyboard layouts, the ambition is to achieve a single international standard as outlined by the European Union, supported by regional or regulatory addendums where necessary. Not multiple harmonized private standards, all competing against each other, trying to achieve the same goal.

International standards organizations express that standardization plays a crucial role for the realization of the UN SDGs in their strategies and activities for sustainability. Similar to reducing and preventing the proliferation of private standards in the information and communication technologies (ICT) sector, governments and IGOs recommend international standards in the food sector. This includes the World Health Organization, the International Trade Centre, UNIDO, the World Trade Organization and the Food and Agriculture Organization.

In September 2025, a partnership was announced between International Organization for Standardization and GHG Protocol to co-develop new standards for GHG emissions measurement and reporting. The objective is to have standardization, as a single unified approach to emissions accounting. While this partnership is welcomed as a single reference point, many carbon accounting organizations like Verra with their Verified Carbon Standard may see this as a threat because they use methodologies that may not meet the enhanced rigor of unified ISO-GHGP standards. This means the voluntary carbon market itself faces increasing scrutiny and regulation that could favor standardization approaches. If the accounting methodologies for calculating these reductions do not align with ISO-GHGP standards, Verified Carbon Units (VCUs) could lose market acceptance.

With the public sector recommending standardization over private sector attempts for harmonization (multiple standards), IGOs are encouraging corporation led coalitions to surrender the control they have over private standards. By promoting international standards and standardization instead of harmonization, the private sector can avoid fragmentation and accusations of undue influence and lobbying in the standards setting and multistakeholder governance process.

== See also ==
- De facto standard
- European Committee for Electrotechnical Standardization
- European Committee for Standardization
- European Telecommunications Standards Institute
- Harmonisation of law
- International Organization for Standardization
- International Standard
- Multistakeholder governance
- Standardization
- Standards organization
- Tax harmonization
- Technical Standard
- World Standards Cooperation
