= International standard =

Standard developed by international standards organizations

An international standard is a technical standard developed by one or more international standards organizations. International standards are available for consideration and use worldwide. The most prominent such organization is the International Organization for Standardization (ISO). Other prominent international standards organizations including the International Telecommunication Union (ITU) and the International Electrotechnical Commission (IEC). Together, these three organizations have formed the World Standards Cooperation alliance.

== Purpose ==
International standards can be applied directly or adapted to meet local conditions. When adopted, they lead to the creation of national standards that are either equivalent to or largely align with the international standards in technical content, though they may have: (i) editorial variations, such as differences in appearance, the use of symbols, measurement units, or the choice of a point over a comma as the decimal marker, and (ii) variations arising from conflicts with government regulations or industry-specific requirements, which may be influenced by factors such as climate, geography, technology, infrastructure, or the safety standards deemed necessary by the relevant authorities.

International standards are one way to overcome technical barriers in international commerce caused by differences among technical regulations and standards developed independently and separately by each nation, national standards organization, or business. Technical barriers arise when different groups come together, each with a large user base, doing some well established thing that between them is mutually incompatible. Establishing international standards is one way of preventing or overcoming this problem. To support this, the World Trade Organization (WTO) Technical Barriers to Trade (TBT) Committee published the "Six Principles" guiding members in the development of international standards.

== History ==
=== Standardization ===
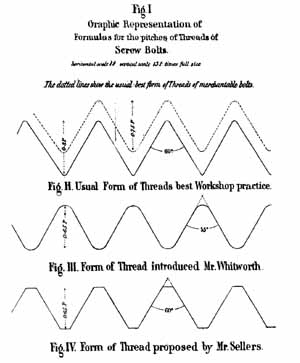
Graphic representation of formulae for the pitches of threads of screw bolts

The implementation of standards in industry and commerce became highly important with the onset of the Industrial Revolution and the need for high-precision machine tools and interchangeable parts. Henry Maudslay developed the first industrially practical screw-cutting lathe in 1800, which allowed for the standardisation of screw thread sizes for the first time.

Maudslay's work, as well as the contributions of other engineers, accomplished a modest amount of industry standardization; some companies' in-house standards spread a bit within their industries. Joseph Whitworth's screw thread measurements were adopted as the first (unofficial) national standard by companies around Britain in 1841. It came to be known as the British Standard Whitworth, and was widely adopted in other countries.

By the end of the 19th century differences in standards between companies were making trade increasingly difficult and strained. The Engineering Standards Committee was established in London in 1901 as the world's first national standards body. After the First World War, similar national bodies were established in other countries. The Deutsches Institut für Normung was set up in Germany in 1917, followed by its counterparts, the American National Standard Institute and the French Commission Permanente de Standardisation, both in 1918.

There are not many books that cover standards in general, but a book written in 2019 by Nicholas Rich and Tegwen Malik gives a very comprehensive overview of the history of standards, how ISO standards are drafted along with key ISO standards such as ISO 9001 and ISO 14001. A paper has been published explaining the differences between international standards and private standards.

=== International organizations ===
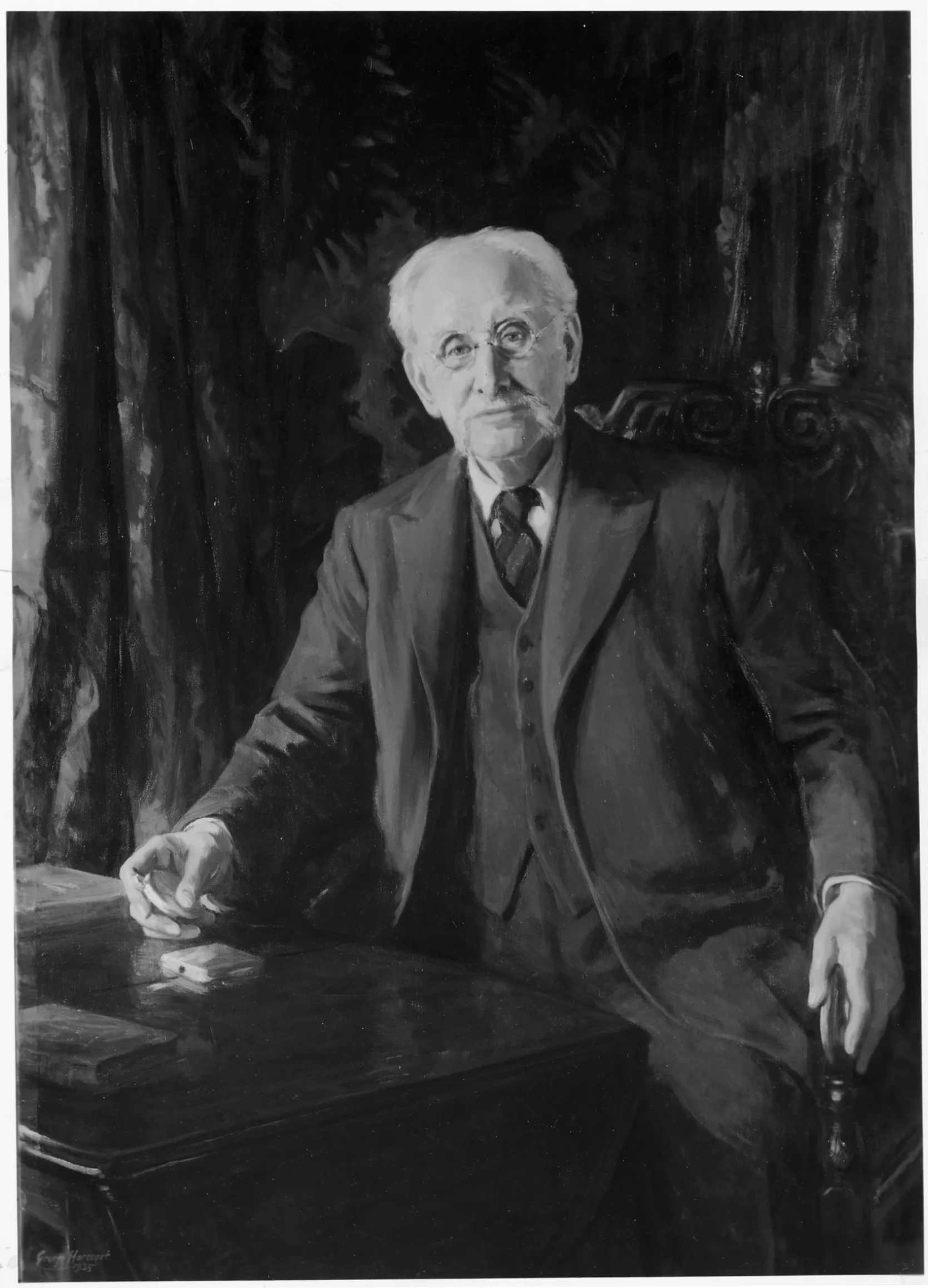
R. E. B. Crompton founded one of the first international standards bodies, the International Electrotechnical Commission, in 1906.

One of the most well established international standardization organizations is the International Telecommunication Union (ITU), a specialized agency of the United Nations which was founded on 17 May 1865 as the International Telegraph Union. The ITU was initially focused on the standardization of telegraph signals, and later evolved to include telephony, radio and satellite communications, and other information and communication technology.

By the mid to late 19th century, efforts were being made to standardize electrical measurement. An important figure was R. E. B. Crompton, who became concerned by the large range of different standards and systems used by electrical engineering companies and scientists in the early 20th century. Many companies had entered the market in the 1890s and all chose their own settings for voltage, frequency, current and even the symbols used on circuit diagrams. Adjacent buildings would have totally incompatible electrical systems simply because they had been fitted by different companies. Crompton could see the lack of efficiency in this system and began to consider proposals for an international standard for electric engineering.

In 1904, Crompton represented Britain at the Louisiana Purchase Exposition in St. Louis as part of a delegation by the Institute of Electrical Engineers. He presented a paper on standardisation, which was so well received that he was asked to look into the formation of a commission to oversee the process. By 1906, his work was complete and he drew up a permanent constitution for the first international standards organization, the International Electrotechnical Commission (IEC). The body held its first meeting that year in London, with representatives from 14 countries. In honour of his contribution to electrical standardisation, Lord Kelvin was elected as the body's first President.

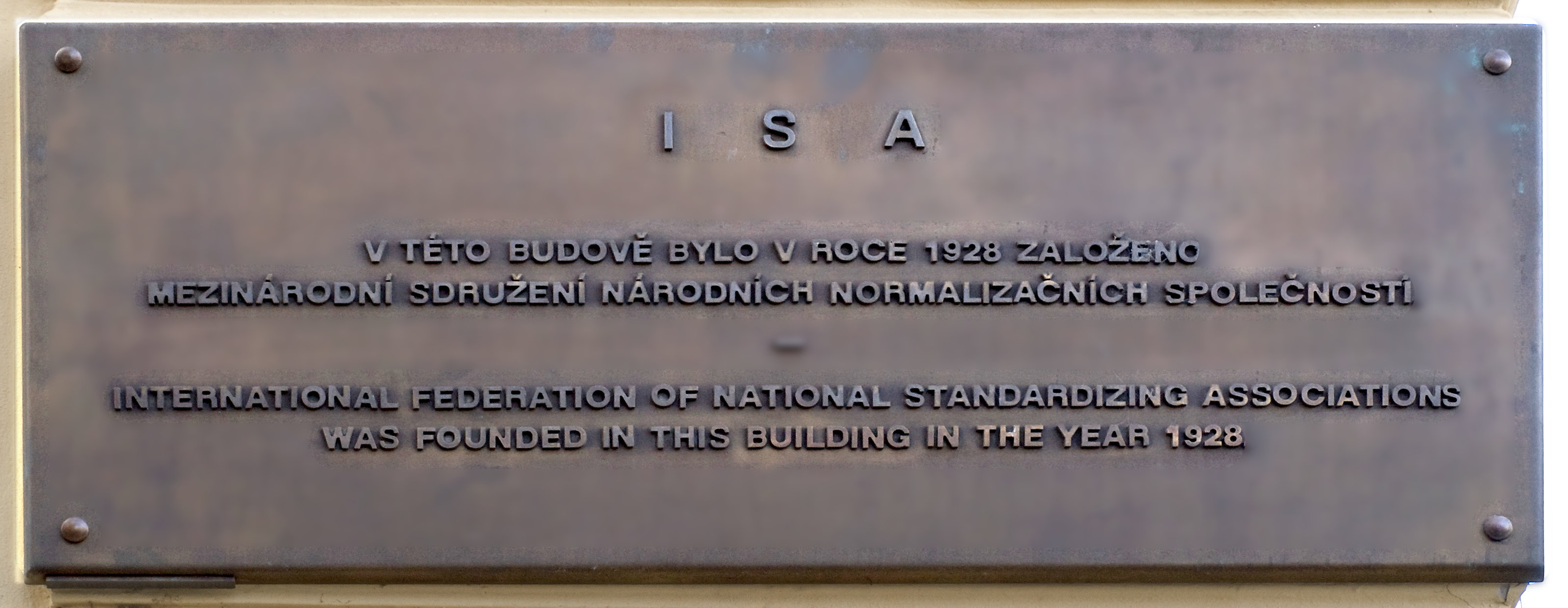
Plaque marking the building in Prague where the ISO predecessor, the ISA, was founded

The International Federation of the National Standardizing Associations (ISA) was founded in 1926 with a broader remit to enhance international cooperation for all technical standards and specifications. The body was disbanded in 1942 during World War II.

After the war, ISA was approached by the recently formed United Nations Standards Coordinating Committee (UNSCC) with a proposal to form a new global standards body. In October 1946, ISA and UNSCC delegates from 25 countries met in London and agreed to join forces to create the International Organization for Standardization (ISO); the organization officially began operations in February 1947.

== Global standards ==
Global standards are also referred to as industry or private standards, which are designed and developed with the entire world in mind. Unlike international standards, these standards are not developed in international organizations or standards setting organizations (SSO) which follow a consensus process. Instead, these standards are developed by private sector entities, like NGOs and for-profit organizations, often without transparency, openness, or consensus considerations. Companies such as MG Environmental Consulting provide consulting services to help businesses and organizations implement environmental management systems and comply with relevant environmental standards.

== See also ==
- Harmonization (standards)
- List of international common standards
- List of technical standard organizations
- Standards organization
- Technical standard
- World Standards Cooperation
- World Standards Day (14 October annually)
