= Sustainable food system =

Balanced growth of nutritional substances and their distribution

The large environmental impact of agriculture (part of "Land Use" in above chart) – such as its greenhouse gas emissions, soil degradation, deforestation and pollinator decline effects – make the food system a critical set of processes that need to be addressed for climate change mitigation and a stable healthy environment.

A sustainable food system is a type of food system that provides healthy food to people and creates sustainable environmental, economic, and social systems that surround food. Sustainable food systems start with the development of sustainable agricultural practices, development of more sustainable food distribution systems, creation of sustainable diets, and reduction of food waste throughout the system. Sustainable food systems have been argued to be central to many or all 17 Sustainable Development Goals.

The global food system is a major contributor to climate change. It is responsible for more than a third (34%) of total greenhouse gas emissions Moving to sustainable food systems, including via shifting consumption to sustainable diets, is an important component of addressing the causes of climate change and adapting to it. Reduction of meat production, which accounts for ~60% of the food system's emissions and ~75% of agriculturally used land, is one major component of this change. Another key feature is reducing dairy consumption, which contributes to approximately 20% of livestock greenhouse gas emissions (largely unrelated to carbon dioxide) and 4% of total anthropogenic emissions.

The global food system is facing major interconnected challenges, including mitigating food insecurity, effects from climate change, biodiversity loss, malnutrition, inequity, soil degradation, pest outbreaks, water and energy scarcity, economic and political crises, natural resource depletion, and preventable ill-health.

The concept of sustainable food systems is frequently at the center of sustainability-focused policy programs, such as proposed Green New Deal programs.

== Definition ==
There are many different definitions of a sustainable food system.

From a global perspective, the Food and Agriculture Organization of the United Nations describes a sustainable food system as follows:

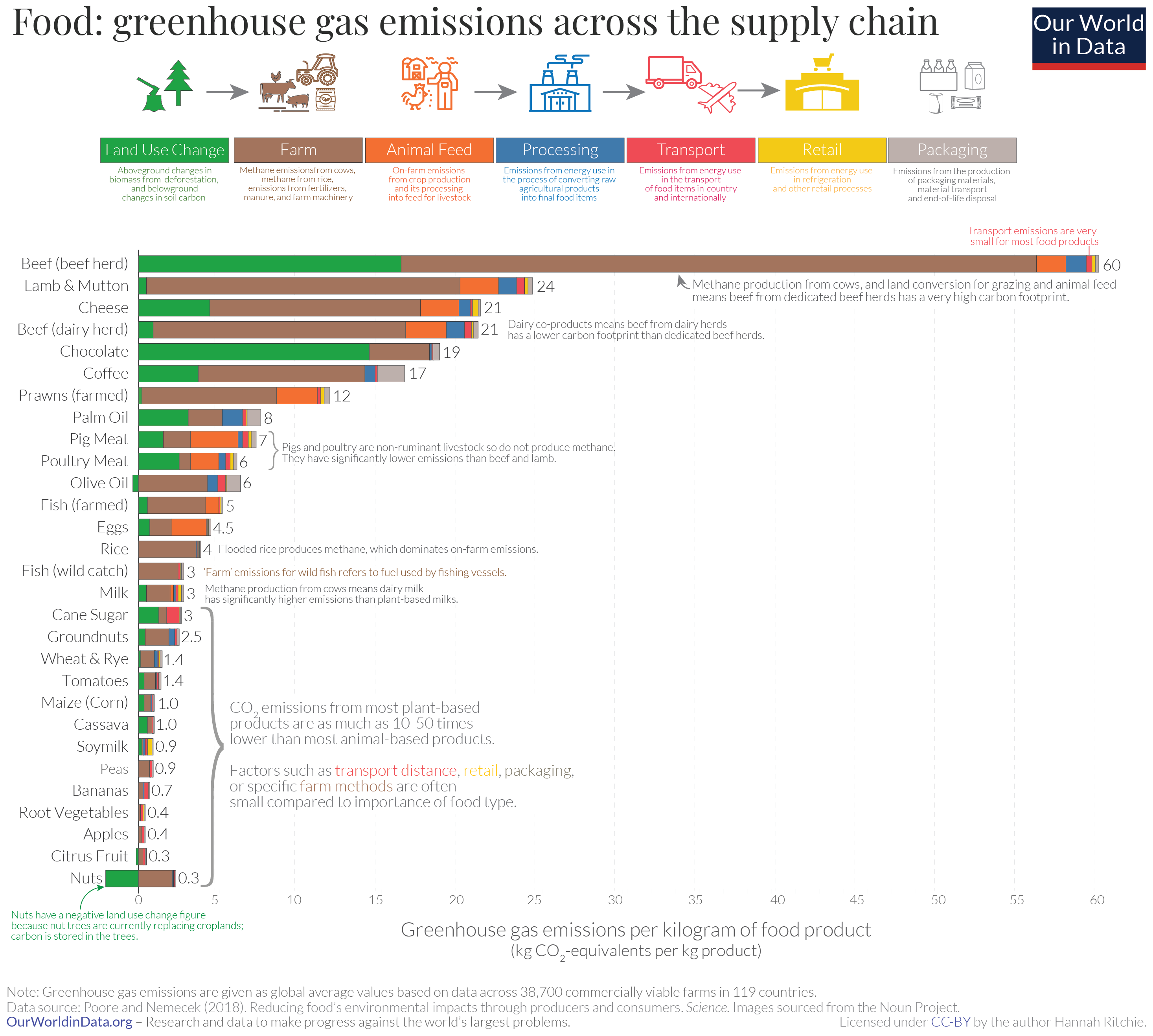
Life-cycle assessment of GHG emissions for foods

A sustainable food system (SFS) is a food system that delivers food security and nutrition for all in such a way that the economic, social and environmental bases to generate food security and nutrition for future generations are not compromised.

This definition highlights profitability, societal benefits, and environmental benefits

The American Public Health Association (APHA) defines a sustainable food system as:

one that provides healthy food to meet current food needs while maintaining healthy ecosystems that can also provide food for generations to come with minimal negative impact to the environment. A sustainable food system also encourages local production and distribution infrastructures and makes nutritious food available, accessible, and affordable to all. Further, it is humane and just, protecting farmers and other workers, consumers, and communities

The European Union's Scientific Advice Mechanism defines a sustainable food system as a system that:

provides and promotes safe, nutritious and healthy food of low environmental impact for all current and future EU citizens in a manner that itself also protects and restores the natural environment and its ecosystem services, is robust and resilient, economically dynamic, just and fair, and socially acceptable and inclusive. It does so without compromising the availability of nutritious and healthy food for people living outside the EU, nor impairing their natural environment

== Problems with conventional food systems ==
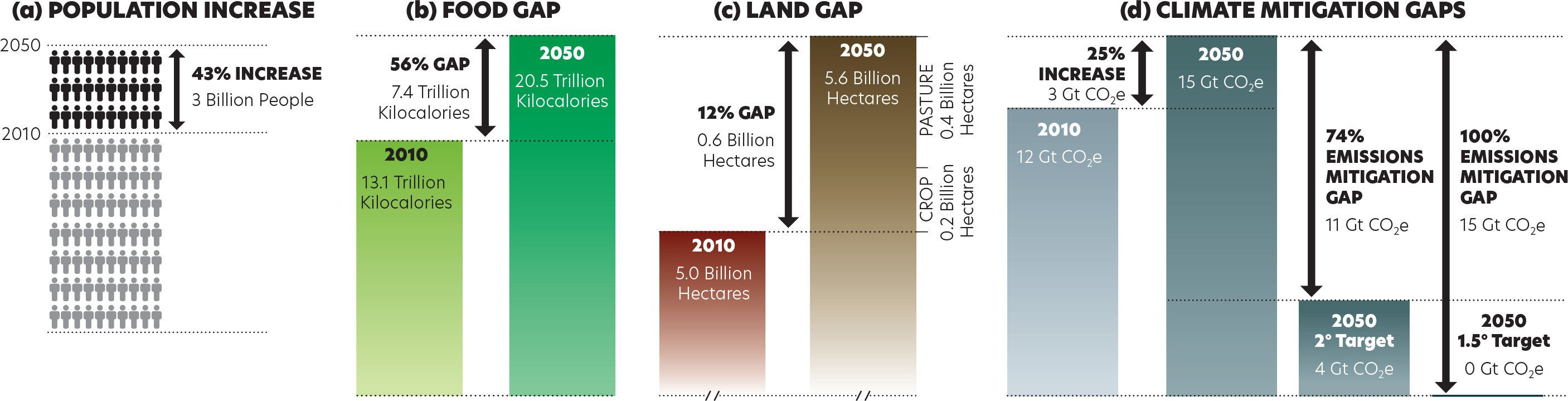
Food-, land-, and climate change mitigation-gaps for 2050, indicating current trajectories are not sustainable longer-term (without collapse, pervasive conflict or similar problems)

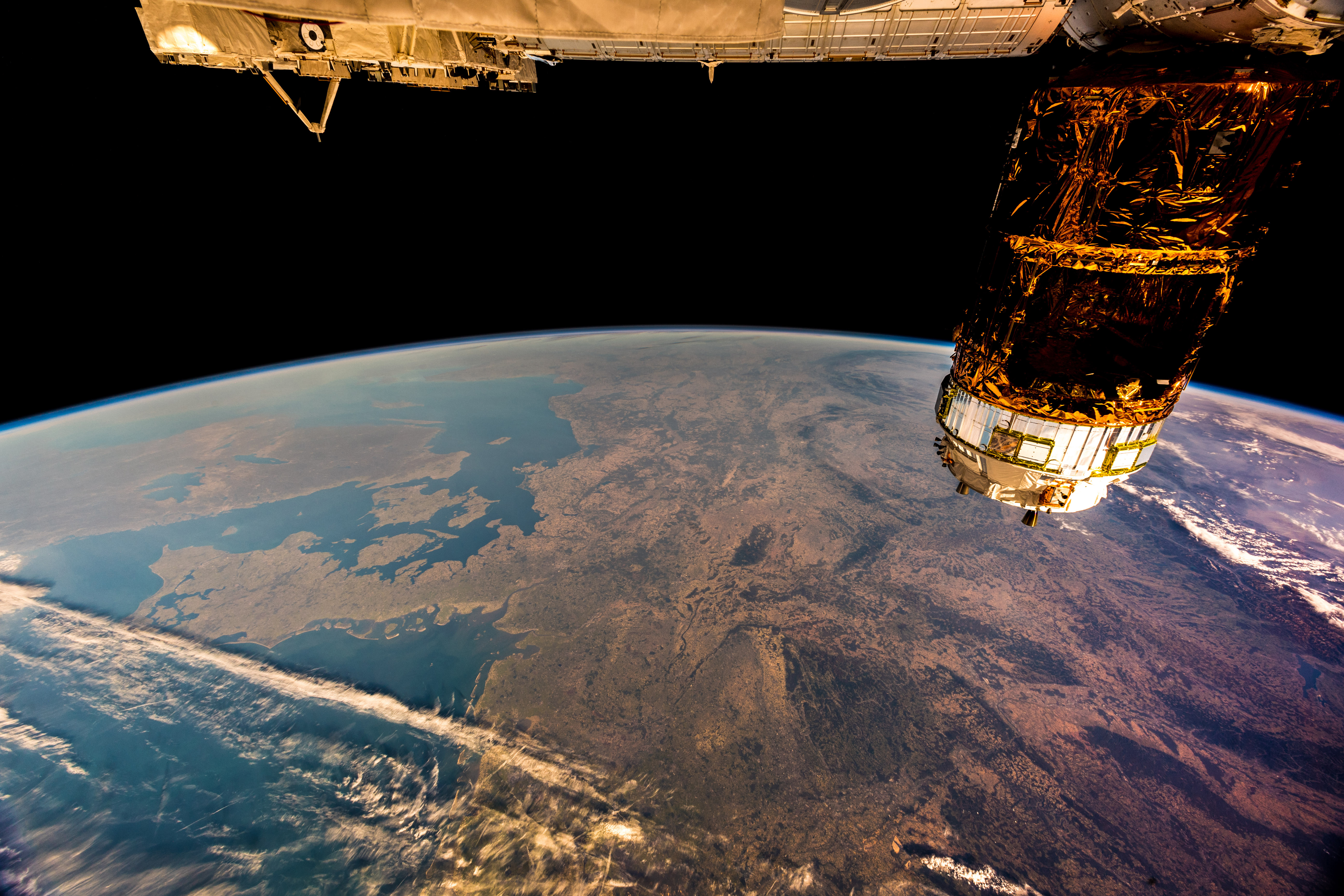
Deforestation in Europe, 2018. Almost all of Europe's original forests have been removed.

Industrial agriculture causes environmental impacts, as well as health problems associated with both obesity and hunger. This has generated a strong interest in healthy, sustainable eating as a major component of the overall movement toward sustainability and climate change mitigation.

Conventional food systems are largely based on the availability of inexpensive fossil fuels, which is necessary for mechanized agriculture, the manufacturing or collection of chemical fertilizers, the processing of food products, and the packaging of foods. Food processing began when the number of consumers started growing rapidly. The demand for cheap and efficient calories climbed, which resulted in nutrition decline. Since more than two billion people are suffering from malnutrition, in 2017, more than 11 million deaths were environmental malnutrition. In fact, during the last 50 - 70 years, environmental, genetic, and field soil dilution factors have decreased the nutritional density of fruits like apples, oranges, bananas, mangos, and vegetables like tomatoes and potatoes by 25-50%. Industrialized agriculture, due to its reliance on economies of scale to reduce production costs, often leads to the compromising of local, regional, or even global ecosystems through fertilizer runoff, nonpoint source pollution, deforestation, suboptimal mechanisms affecting consumer product choice, and greenhouse gas emissions.

=== Food and power ===
In the contemporary world, transnational corporations execute high levels of control over the food system. In this system, both farmers and consumers are disadvantaged and have little control; power is concentrated in the center of the supply chain, where corporations control how food moves from producers to consumers.

==== Disempowerment of consumers ====
People living in different areas face substantial inequality in their access to healthy food. Areas where affordable, healthy food, particularly fresh fruits and vegetables, is difficult to access are sometimes called food deserts. This term has been particularly applied in the USA. In addition, conventional channels do not distribute food by emergency assistance or charity. Urban residents receive more sustainable food production from healthier and safer sources than low-income communities. Nonetheless, conventional channels are more sustainable than charitable or welfare food resources. Even though the conventional food system provides easier access and lower prices, their food may not be the best for the environment nor consumer health.

People who live in food deserts are currently being overfed with fast food and ultra-processed foods, yet remain undernourished because they are consuming nutrient-poor diets. Both obesity and undernutrition are associated with poverty and marginalization. This has been referred to as the "double burden of malnutrition." In low-income areas, there may be abundant access to fast-food or small convenience stores and "corner" stores, but no supermarkets that sell a variety of healthy foods.

==== Disempowerment of producers ====
Small farms tend to be more sustainable than large farming operations, because of differences in their management and methods. Industrial agriculture replaces human labor using increased usage of fossil fuels, fertilizers, pesticides, and machinery and is heavily reliant on monoculture. However, if current trends continue, the number of operating farms in existence is expected to halve by 2100, as smallholders' farms are consolidated into larger operations. The percentage of people who work as farmers worldwide dropped from 44% to 26% between 1991 and 2020.

Small farmers worldwide are often trapped in poverty and have little agency in the global food system. Smallholder farms produce a greater diversity of crops as well as harboring more non-crop biodiversity, but in wealthy, industrialized countries, small farms have declined severely. For example, in the USA, 4% of the total number of farms operate 26% of all agricultural land.

=== Complications from globalization ===
The need to reduce production costs in an increasingly global market can cause production of foods to be moved to areas where economic costs (labor, taxes, etc.) are lower or environmental regulations are more lax, which are usually further from consumer markets. For example, the majority of salmon sold in the United States is raised off the coast of Chile, due in large part to less stringent Chilean standards regarding fish feed and regardless of the fact that salmon are not indigenous in Chilean coastal waters. The globalization of food production can result in the loss of traditional food systems in less developed countries and have negative impacts on the population health, ecosystems, and cultures in those countries.

Globalization of sustainable food systems has coincided the proliferation of private standards in the agri-food sector where big food retailers have formed multi-stakeholder initiatives (MSIs) with governance over standard setting organizations (SSOs) who maintain the standards. One such MSI is the Consumer Goods Forum(CGF). With CGF members openly using lobbying dollars to influence trade agreements for food systems which leads to creating barriers to competition. Concerns around corporate governance within food systems as a substitute for regulation were raised by the Institute for Multi-Stakeholder Initiative Integrity. The proliferation of private standards resulted in standard harmonization from organizations that include the Global Food Safety Initiative and ISEAL Alliance. The unintended consequence of standard harmonization was a perverse incentive because companies owning private standards generate revenue from fees that other companies have to pay to implement the standards. This has led to more and more private standards entering the marketplace who are enticed to make money.

=== Systemic structures ===
Moreover, the existing conventional food system lacks the inherent framework necessary to foster sustainable models of food production and consumption. Within the decision-making processes associated with this system, the burden of responsibility primarily falls on consumers and private enterprises. This expectation places the onus on individuals to voluntarily and often without external incentives, expend effort to educate themselves about sustainable behaviours and specific product choices. This educational endeavour is reliant on the availability of public information. Subsequently, consumers are urged to alter their decision-making patterns concerning production and consumption, driven by prioritised ethical values and sometimes health benefits, even when significant drawbacks are prevalent.

These drawbacks faced by consumers include elevated costs of organic foods, imbalanced monetary price differentials between animal-intensive diets and plant-based alternatives, and an absence of comprehensive consumer guidance aligned with contemporary valuations. In 2020, an analysis of external climate costs of foods indicated that external greenhouse gas costs are typically highest for animal-based products – conventional and organic to about the same extent within that ecosystem subdomain – followed by conventional dairy products and lowest for organic plant-based foods. It finds contemporary monetary evaluations to be "inadequate" and policy-making that lead to reductions of these costs to be possible, appropriate and urgent.

=== Agricultural pollution ===
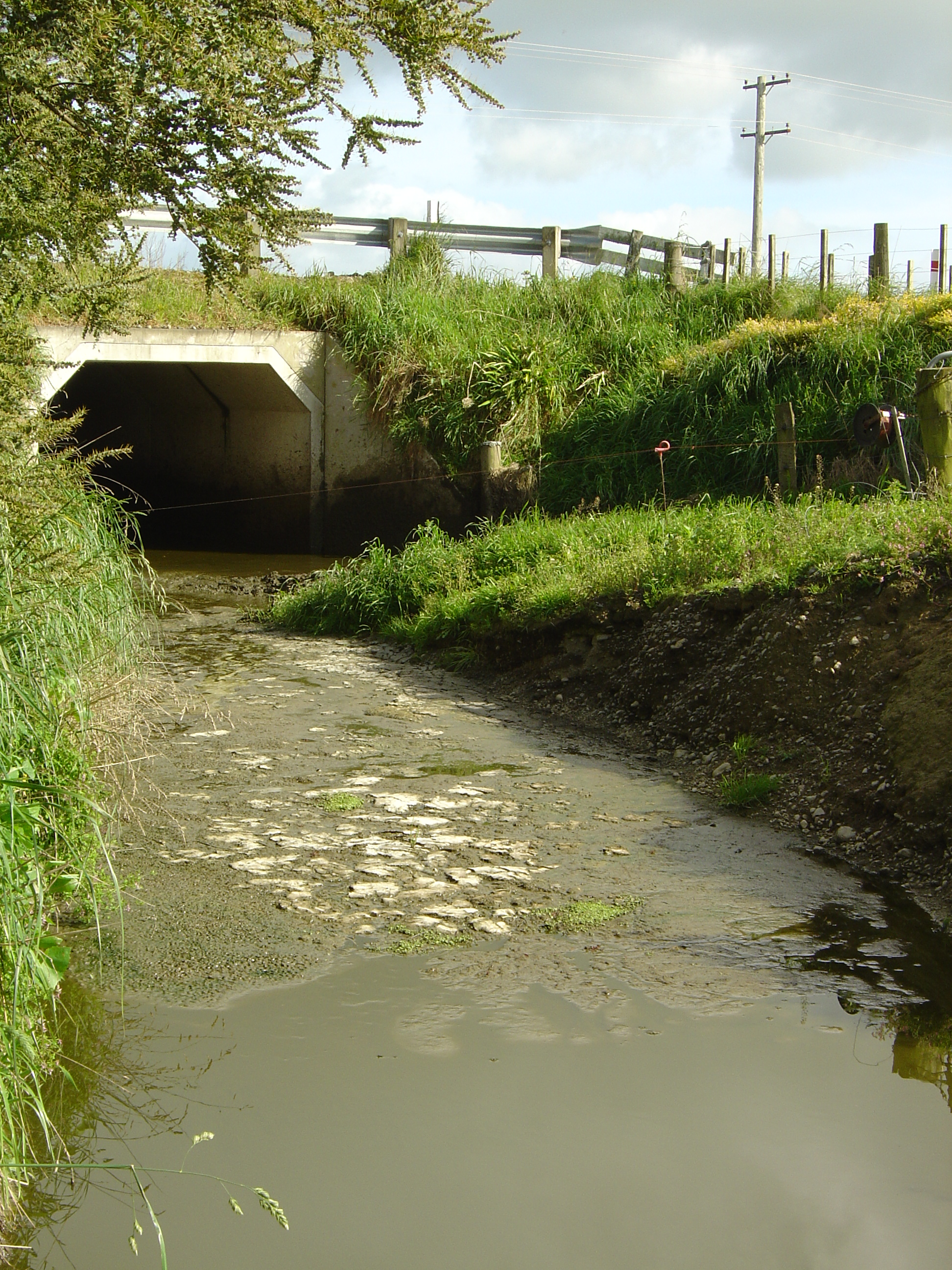
Water pollution due to dairy farming in the Wairarapa area of New Zealand (photographed in 2003)

Agricultural pollution problem refers to biotic and abiotic byproducts of farming practices that result in contamination or degradation of the environment and surrounding ecosystems, and/or cause injury to humans and their economic interests. The pollution may come from a variety of sources, ranging from point source water pollution (from a single discharge point) to more diffuse, landscape-level causes, also known as non-point source pollution and air pollution. Once in the environment these pollutants can have both direct effects in surrounding ecosystems, e.g. killing local wildlife or contaminating drinking water, and downstream effects such as dead zones caused by agricultural runoff is concentrated in large water bodies.

Management practices, or ignorance of them, play a crucial role in the amount and impact of these pollutants. Management techniques range from animal management and housing to the spread of pesticides and fertilizers in global agricultural practices, which can have major environmental impacts. Bad management practices include poorly managed animal feeding operations, overgrazing, plowing, fertilizer, and improper, excessive, or badly timed use of pesticides.

Pollutants from agriculture greatly affect water quality and can be found in lakes, rivers, wetlands, estuaries, and groundwater. Pollutants from farming include sediments, nutrients, pathogens, pesticides, metals, and salts. Animal agriculture has an outsized impact on pollutants that enter the environment. Bacteria and pathogens in manure can make their way into streams and groundwater if grazing, storing manure in lagoons and applying manure to fields is not properly managed. Air pollution caused by agriculture through land use changes and animal agriculture practices have an outsized impact on climate change. Addressing these concerns was a central part of the IPCC Special Report on Climate Change and Land as well as in the 2024 UNEP Actions on Air Quality report. Mitigation of agricultural pollution is a key component in the development of a sustainable food system.

== Sourcing sustainable food ==
A matrix of the progress in the adoption of management practices and approaches

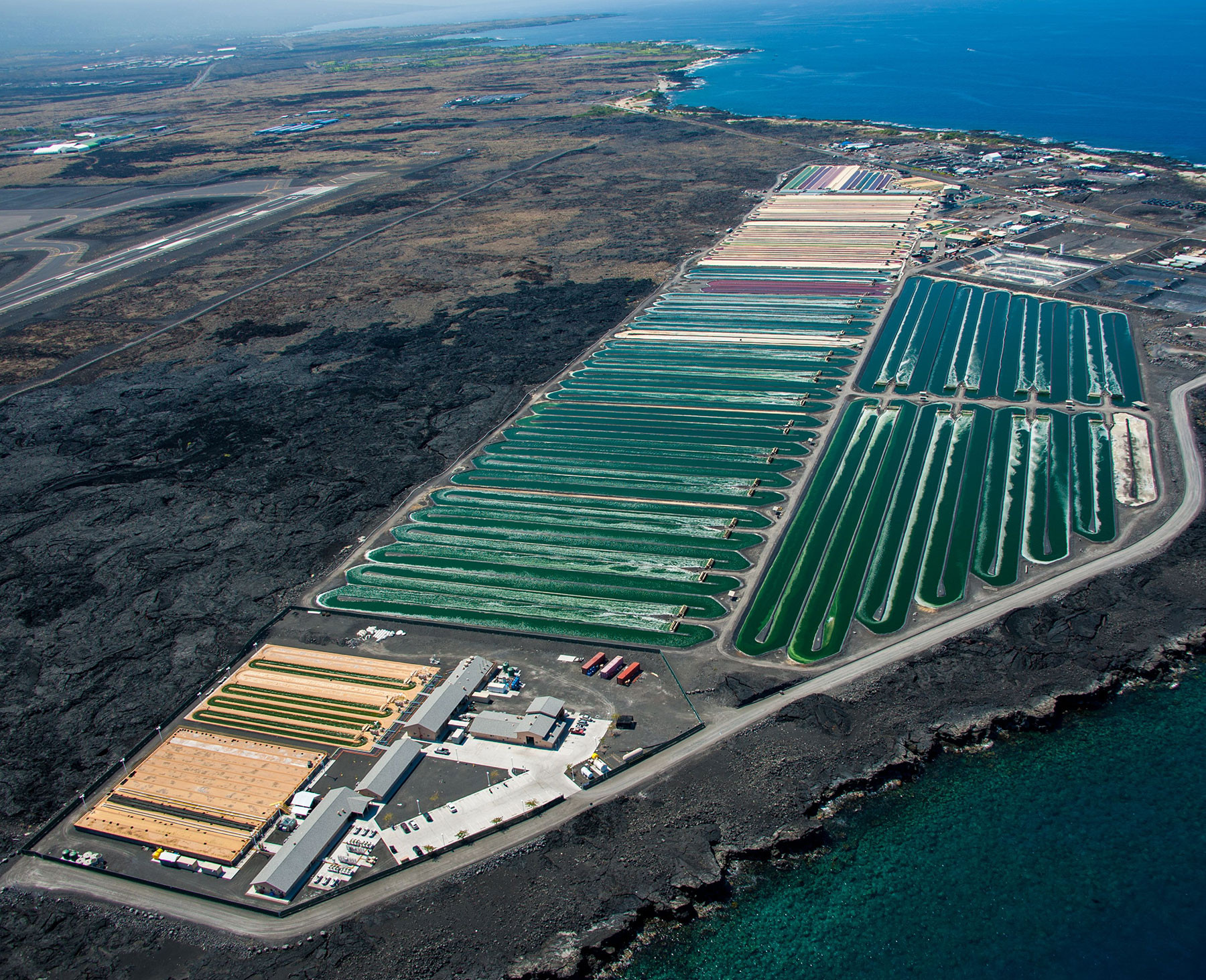
A Microalgae cultivation facility

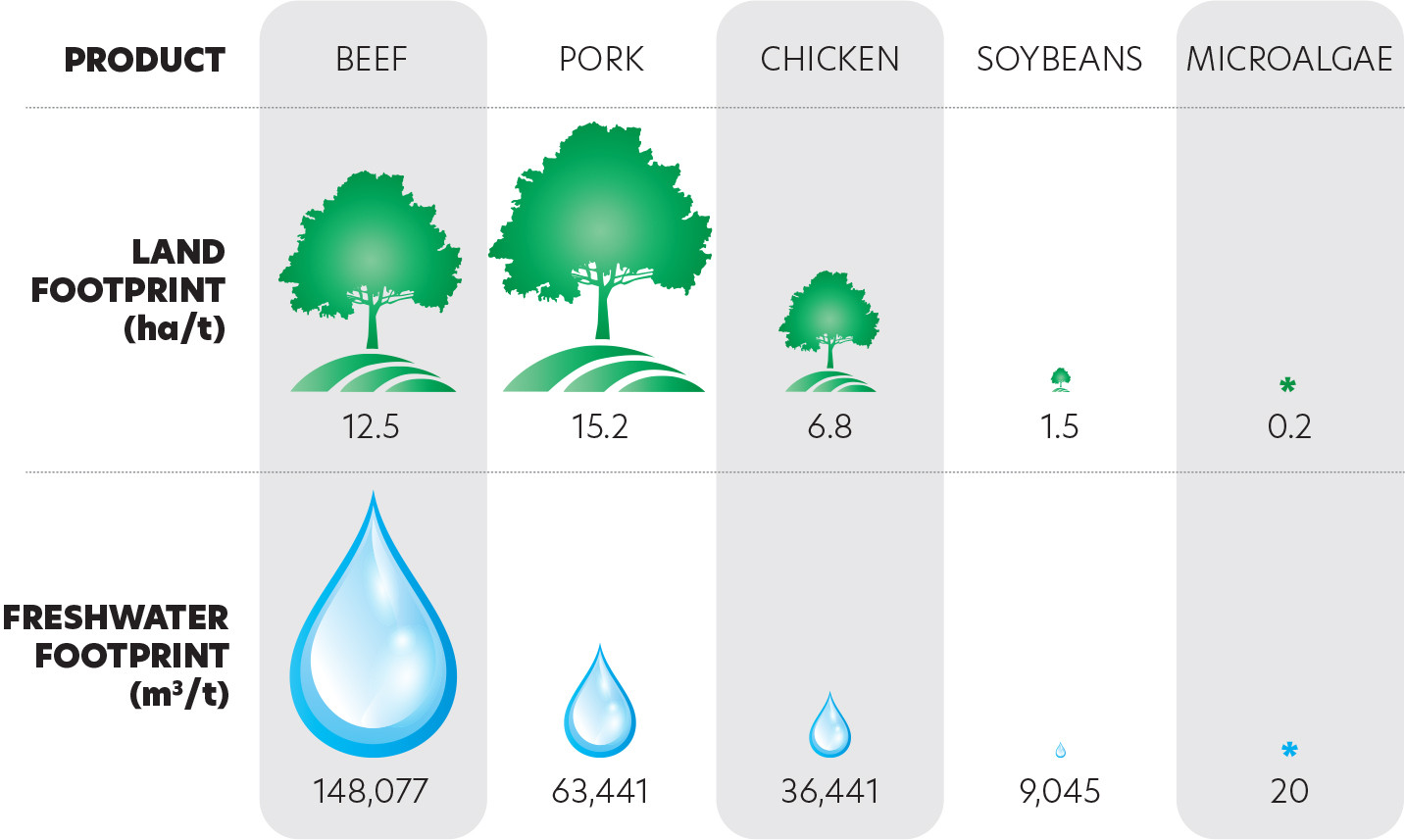
Comparison of footprints for protein production

A video explaining the development of cultured meat and a "post-animal bio-economy" driven by lab grown protein (meat, eggs, milk)

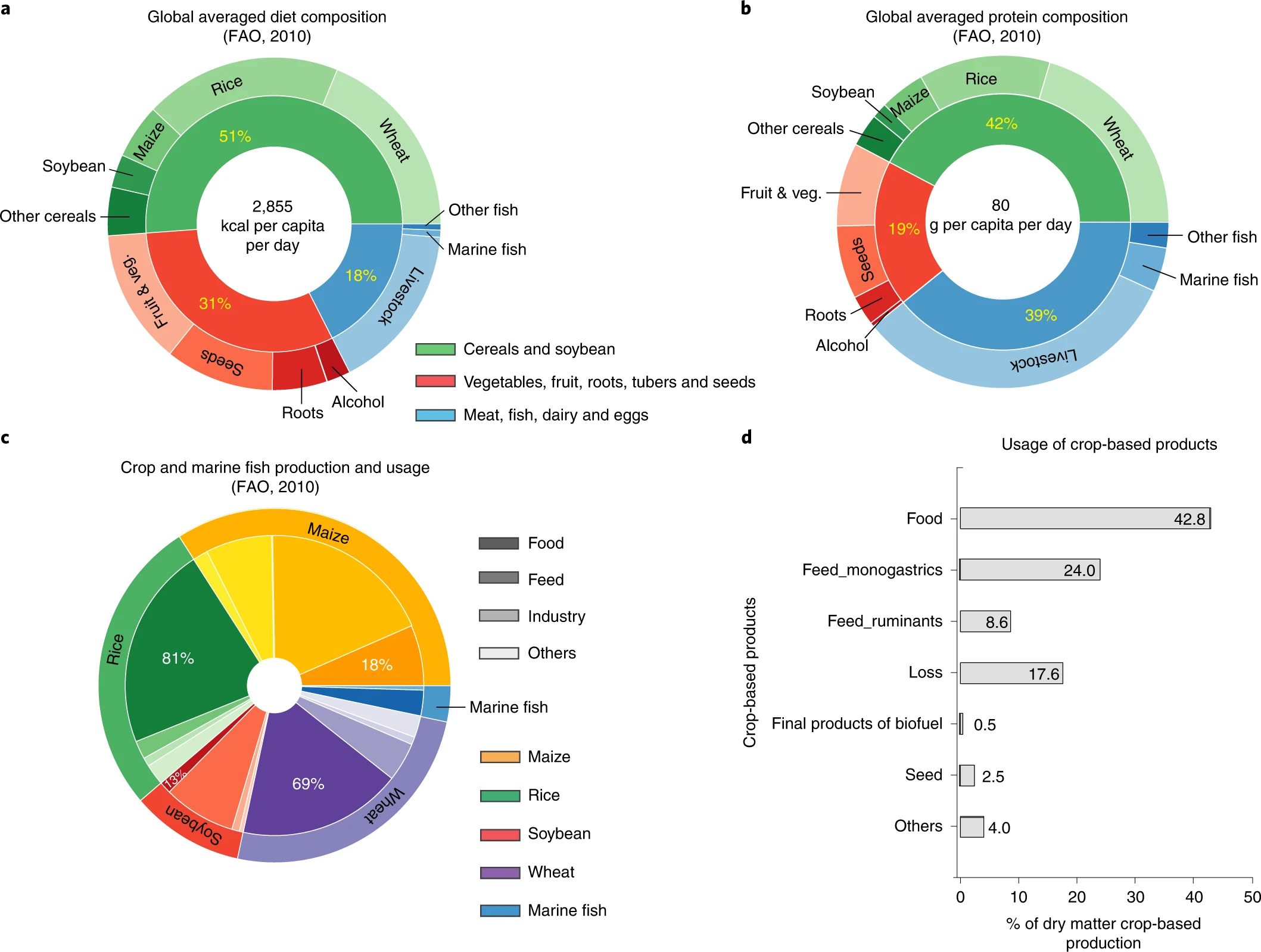
Global average human diet and protein composition and usage of crop-based products

At the global level the environmental impact of agribusiness is being addressed through sustainable agriculture, cellular agriculture and organic farming.

Various alternatives to meat and novel classes of foods can substantially increase sustainability. There are large potential benefits of marine algae-based aquaculture for the development of a future healthy and sustainable food system. Fungiculture, another sector of a growing bioeconomy besides algaculture, may also become a larger component of a sustainable food system. Consumption shares of various other ingredients for meat analogues such as protein from pulses may also rise substantially in a sustainable food system. The integration of single-cell protein, which can be produced from captured CO_{2}. Optimized dietary scenarios would also see changes in various other types of foods such as nuts, as well as pulses such as beans, which have favorable environmental and health profiles.

Complementary approaches under development include vertical farming of various types of foods and various agricultural technologies, often using digital agriculture.

=== Sustainable seafood ===
Sustainable seafood is seafood from either fished or farmed sources that can maintain or increase production in the future without jeopardizing the ecosystems from which it was acquired. The sustainable seafood movement has gained momentum as more people become aware about both overfishing and environmentally destructive fishing methods. The goal of sustainable seafood practices is to ensure that fish populations are able to continue to thrive, that marine habitats are protected, and that fishing and aquaculture practices do not have negative impacts on local communities or economies.

There are several factors that go into determining whether a seafood product is sustainable or not. These include the method of fishing or farming, the health of the fish population, the impact on the surrounding environment, and the social and economic implications of the seafood production. Some sustainable seafood practices include using methods that minimize bycatch, implementing seasonal or area closures to allow fish populations to recover, and using aquaculture methods that minimize the use of antibiotics or other chemicals. Organizations such as the Marine Stewardship Council (MSC) and the Aquaculture Stewardship Council (ASC) work to promote sustainable seafood practices and provide certification for products that meet their sustainability standards.

In addition, many retailers and restaurants are now offering sustainable seafood options to their customers, often labeled with a sustainability certification logo to make it easier for consumers to make informed choices. Consumers can also play a role in promoting sustainable seafood by making conscious choices about the seafood they purchase and consume. This can include choosing seafood that is labeled as sustainably harvested or farmed, asking questions about the source and production methods of the seafood they purchase, and supporting restaurants and retailers that prioritize sustainability in their seafood offerings. By working together to promote sustainable seafood practices, we can help to ensure the health and sustainability of our oceans and the communities that depend on them.

=== Sustainable animal feed ===
A study suggests there would be large environmental benefits of using insects for animal feed.When substituting mixed grain, which is currently the main animal feed, insect feed lowers water and land requirement and emits fewer greenhouse gas and ammonia.

In addition, the use of artificial intelligence (AI) and precision feeding technologies are other approaches to improve the sustainability of animal feed. With these advanced technologies, producers will be able to create animal feed mixtures with all nutritional requirements needed. On top of this, all available ingredients that may have gone to waste, will now be used efficiently. Further, the amount and composition of feed to supply animals’ needs will effectively be adjusted by implementing precision feeding to reduce feed waste. The environmental impacts of livestock production will improve with the help of these approaches as they will tackle the problem of resource efficiency.

==== Sustainable pet food ====
Recent studies show that vegan diets, which are more sustainable, would not have negative impact on the health of pet dogs and cats if implemented appropriately. It aims to minimize the ecological footprint of pet food production while still providing the necessary nutrition for pets. Recent studies have explored the potential benefits of vegan diets for pets in terms of sustainability.

One example is the growing body of research indicating that properly formulated and balanced vegan diets can meet the nutritional needs of dogs and cats without compromising their health. These studies suggest that with appropriate planning and supplementation, pets can thrive on plant-based diets. This is significant from a sustainability perspective as traditional pet food production heavily relies on animal-based ingredients, which contribute to deforestation, greenhouse gas emissions, and overfishing.

By opting for sustainable pet food options, such as plant-based or eco-friendly alternatives, pet owners can reduce their pets' carbon footprint and support more ethical and sustainable practices in the pet food industry. Additionally, sustainable pet food may also prioritize the use of responsibly sourced ingredients, organic farming practices, and minimal packaging waste. When considering a vegan or alternative diet for pets, consultation with a veterinarian is important. Each pet has unique nutritional requirements, and a professional can help determine the most suitable diet plan to ensure all necessary nutrients are provided.

The nutritional quality of commercial pet foods can vary. A 2026 systematic review of 54 studies that analyzed commercially available dog and cat foods found nutrient deficiencies or excesses in 44 of them, relative to the guidelines of the Association of American Feed Control Officials (AAFCO), the European Pet Food Industry Federation (FEDIAF), and the National Research Council (NRC). These deficiencies and excesses were found across vegan, meat-based, insect-based and raw products. Calcium, phosphorus and zinc were the most commonly deficient nutrients in both dog and cat foods, along with taurine in cat foods. While vegan products generally performed well on fatty acid profile and selenium, they sometimes fell short on certain B vitamins, and the authors noted that few studies had examined vegan food products specifically.

=== Substitution of meat and sustainable meat and dairy ===
A study shows that novel foods such as cultured meat and dairy, algae, existing microbial foods, and ground-up insects are shown to have the potential to reduce environmental impacts – by over 80%. Various combinations may further reduce the environmental impacts of these alternatives – for example, a study explored solar-energy-driven production of microbial foods from direct air capture. Alternatives are not only relevant for human consumption but also for pet food and other animal feed. Consumer acceptance of alternative protein sources varies significantly. A comprehensive review of 91 studies found that insect-based proteins ranked lowest in acceptance among meat substitutes, followed by cultured meat, while plant-based options achieved the highest acceptance rates.

==== Meat reduction strategies ====
We must change our diet. The planet can't support billions of meat-eaters.

— David Attenborough

Strategies for implementing meat-reduction among populations include large-scale education and awareness building to promote more sustainable consumption styles. Other types of policy interventions could accelerate these shifts and might include "restrictions or fiscal mechanisms such as meat taxes". In the case of fiscal mechanisms, these could be based on forms of scientific calculation of external costs (externalities currently not reflected in any way in the monetary price) to make the polluter pay, e.g. for the damage done by excess nitrogen. In the case of restrictions, this could be based on limited domestic supply or Personal (Carbon) Allowances (certificates and credits which would reward sustainable behavior).

Relevant to such a strategy, estimating the environmental impacts of food products in a standardized way – as has been done with a dataset of more than 57,000 food products in supermarkets – could also be used to inform consumers or in policy, making consumers more aware of the environmental impacts of animal-based products (or requiring them to take such into consideration).

Young adults that are faced with new physical or social environments (for example, moving away from home) are also more likely to make dietary changes and reduce their meat intake. Another strategy includes increasing the prices of meat while also reducing the prices of plant-based products, which could show a significant impact on meat-reduction.

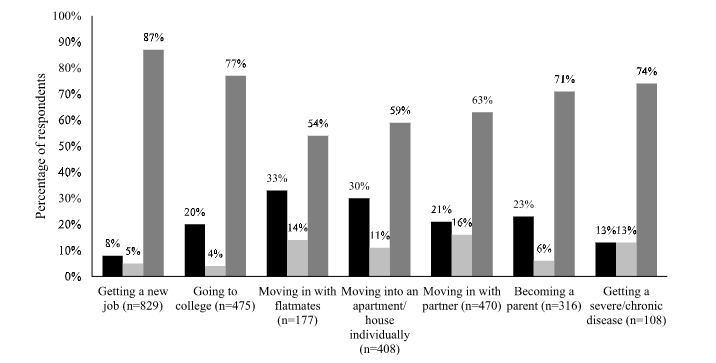
Meat reduction and increased plant-based preferences seen based on social and other life changes.

A reduction in meat portion sizes could potentially be more beneficial than cutting out meat entirely from ones diet, according to a 2022 study. This study revolved around young Dutch adults, and showed that the adults were more reluctant to cut out meat entirely to make the change to plant-based diets due to habitual behaviours. Increasing and improving plant-based alternatives, as well as the education about plant-based alternatives, proved to be one of the most effective ways to combat these behaviours. The lack of education about plant-based alternatives is a road-block for most people - most adults do not know how to properly cook plant-based meals or know the health risks/benefits associated with a vegetarian diet - which is why education among adults is important in meat-reduction strategies.

A July 2019 report by the World Resources Institute suggested that governments around the world should reduce subsidies for meat and dairy production while simultaneously increasing taxes on both, making these products more expensive. In the Netherlands, a meat tax of 15% to 30% could show a reduction of meat consumption by 8% to 16%. as well as reducing the amount of livestock by buying out farmers. In 2022, the city of Haarlem, Netherlands announced that advertisements for factory-farmed meat will be banned in public places, starting in 2024.

A 2022 review concluded that "low and moderate meat consumption levels are compatible with the climate targets and broader sustainable development, even for 10 billion people".

In June 2023, the European Commission's Scientific Advice Mechanism published a review of all available evidence and accompanying policy recommendations to promote sustainable food consumption and reducing meat intake. They reported that the evidence supports policy interventions on pricing (including "meat taxes, and pricing products according to their environmental impacts, as well as lower taxes on healthy and sustainable alternatives"), availability and visibility, food composition, labelling and the social environment. They also stated:

People choose food not just through rational reflection, but also based on many other factors: food availability, habits and routines, emotional and impulsive reactions, and their financial and social situation. So we should consider ways to unburden the consumer and make sustainable, healthy food an easy and affordable choice.

==== Effects and combination of measures ====
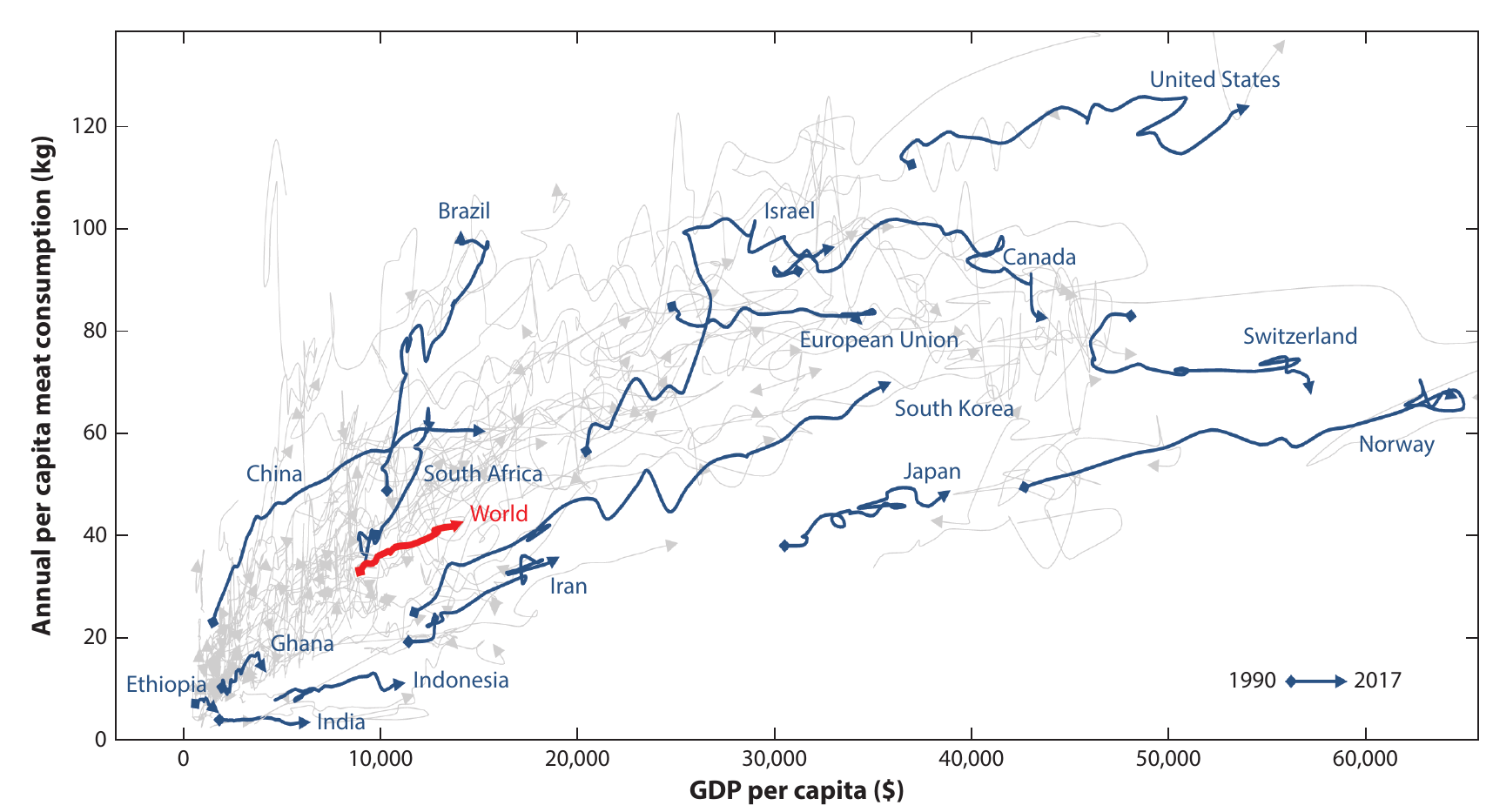
Per capita meat consumption and GDP 1990–2017

Producers can reduce ruminant enteric fermentation using genetic selection, immunization, rumen defaunation, competition of methanogenic archaea with acetogens, introduction of methanotrophic bacteria into the rumen, diet modification and grazing management, among others. The principal mitigation strategies identified for reduction of agricultural nitrous oxide emissions are avoiding over-application of nitrogen fertilizers and adopting suitable manure management practices. Mitigation strategies for reducing carbon dioxide emissions in the livestock sector include adopting more efficient production practices to reduce agricultural pressure for deforestation (such as in Latin America), reducing fossil fuel consumption, and increasing carbon sequestration in soils.

Methane belching from cattle might be reduced by intensification of farming, selective breeding, immunization against the many methanogens, rumen defaunation (killing the bacteria-killing protozoa), diet modification (e.g. seaweed fortification using species such as Asparagopsis, cultivated at scale by companies such as Asparagopsis Technologies), decreased antibiotic use, and grazing management.

Measures that increase state revenues from meat consumption/production could enable the use of these funds for related research and development and "to cushion social hardships among low-income consumers". Meat and livestock are important sectors of the contemporary socioeconomic system, with livestock value chains employing an estimated >1.3 billion people.

Sequestering carbon into soil is currently not feasible to cancel out planet-warming emissions caused by the livestock sector. The global livestock annually emits 135 billion metric tons of carbon, way more than can be returned to the soil. Despite this, the idea of sequestering carbon to the soil is currently advocated by livestock industry as well as grassroots groups.

Agricultural subsidies for cattle and their feedstock could be stopped. A more controversial suggestion, advocated by George Monbiot in the documentary "Apocalypse Cow", is to stop farming cattle completely, however farmers often have political power so might be able to resist such a big change.

"Policy sequencing" to gradually extend regulations once established to other forest risk commodities (e.g. other than beef) and regions while coordinating with other importing countries could prevent ineffectiveness.

==== Meat and dairy ====
Despite meat from livestock such as beef and lamb being considered unsustainable, some regenerative agriculture proponents suggest rearing livestock with a mixed farming system to restore organic matter in grasslands. Organizations such as the Canadian Roundtable for Sustainable Beef (CRSB) are looking for solutions to reduce the impact of meat production on the environment. In October 2021, 17% of beef sold in Canada was certified as sustainable beef by the CRSB. However, sustainable meat has led to criticism, as environmentalists point out that the meat industry excludes most of its emissions.

Important mitigation options for reducing the greenhouse gas emissions from livestock include genetic selection, introduction of methanotrophic bacteria into the rumen, vaccines, feeds, toilet-training, diet modification and grazing management. Other options include shifting to ruminant-free alternatives, such as milk substitutes and meat analogues or poultry, which generates far fewer emissions.

Plant-based meat is proposed for sustainable alternatives to meat consumption. Plant-based meat emits 30%–90% less greenhouse gas than conventional meat (kg-CO_{2}-eq/kg-meat) and 72%–99% less water than conventional meat. Public company Beyond Meat and privately held company Impossible Foods are examples of plant-based food production. However, consulting firm Sustainalytics assured that these companies are not more sustainable than meat-processors competitors such as food processor JBS, and they don't disclose all the CO_{2} emissions of their supply chain.

Beyond reducing negative impacts of meat production, facilitating shifts towards more sustainable meat, and facilitating reduced meat consumption (including via plant-based meat substitutes), cultured meat may offer a potentially sustainable way to produce real meat without the associated negative environmental impacts.

=== Phase-outs, co-optimization and environmental standards ===
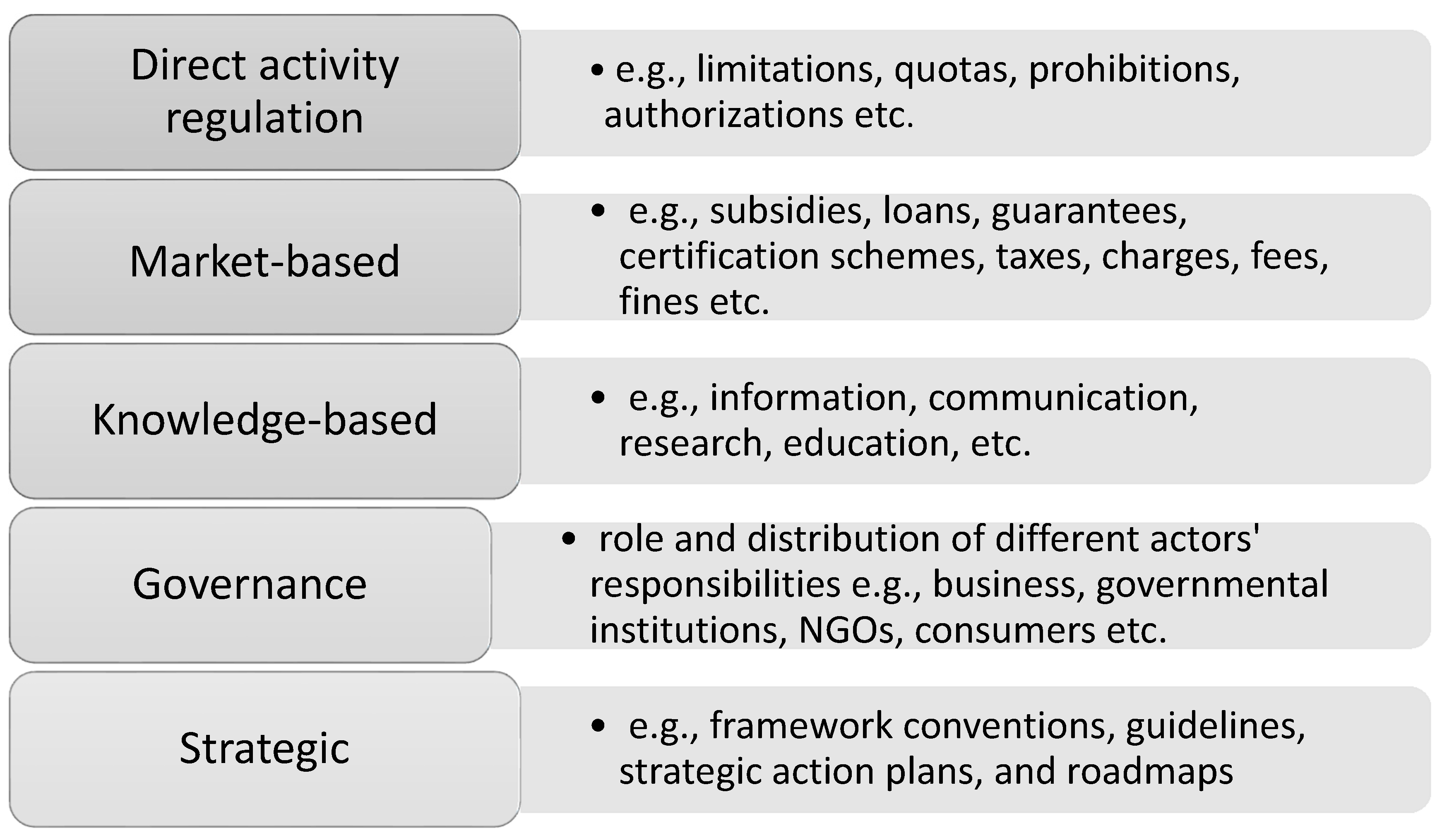
Five broad food policy categories

In regards to deforestation, a study proposed kinds of "climate clubs" of "as many other states as possible taking similar measures and establishing uniform environmental standards". It suggested that "otherwise, global problems remain unsolvable, and shifting effects will occur" and that "border adjustments [...] have to be introduced to target those states that do not participate—again, to avoid shifting effects with ecologically and economically detrimental consequences", with such "border adjustments or eco-tariffs" incentivizing other countries to adjust their standards and domestic production to join the climate club. Identified potential barriers to sustainability initiatives may include contemporary trade-policy goals and competition law. Greenhouse gas emissions for countries are often measured according to production, for imported goods that are produced in other countries than where they are consumed "embedded emissions" refers to the emissions of the product. In cases where such products are and remain imported, eco-tariffs could over time adjust prices for specific categories of products – or for specific non-collaborative polluting origin countries – such as deforestation-associated meat, foods with intransparent supply-chain origin or foods with high embedded emissions.

=== Agricultural productivity and environmental efficiency ===
Agricultural productivity (including e.g. reliability of yields) is an important component of food security and increasing it sustainably (e.g. with high efficiency in terms of environmental impacts) could be a major way to decrease negative environmental impacts, such as by decreasing the amount of land needed for farming or reducing environmental degradation like deforestation.

==== Genetically engineered crops ====
There is research and development to engineer genetically modified crops with increased heat/drought/stress resistance, increased yields, lower water requirements, and overall lower environmental impacts, among other things.

==== Novel agricultural technologies ====
Vertical farms, automation, solar energy production, novel alternatives to pesticides, online food delivery ICTs, and other technologies may allow for localization or modified food production alongside policies such as eco-tariffs, targeted subsidies and meat taxes.

Artificial intelligence and data-driven approaches are increasingly applied in food systems to analyze complex data and support decision-making in food production, processing, distribution, safety, nutrition, and sustainability.

Technologies such as vertical farms, automation, agrivoltaic systems, biopesticides, and digital food distribution, together with policy tools like eco-tariffs, targeted subsidies, and meat taxes, can support localized food production, reduce resource use, and promote sustainable consumption.

Artificial intelligence (AI) and data-driven approaches can support sustainable food systems through resource optimization, environmental assessment, and improved production and supply-chain decision-making.

=== Organic food ===
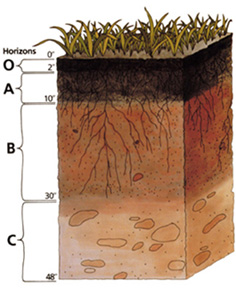
Farming, especially non-organic farming degrades soil often intended to be used to provide food in the future.

From an environmental perspective, fertilizing, overproduction and the use of pesticides in conventional farming has caused, and is causing, enormous damage worldwide to local ecosystems, soil health, biodiversity, groundwater and drinking water supplies, and sometimes farmers' health and fertility.

Organic farming typically reduces some environmental impact relative to conventional farming, but the scale of reduction can be difficult to quantify and varies depending on farming methods. In some cases, reducing food waste and dietary changes might provide greater benefits. A 2020 study at the Technical University of Munich found that the greenhouse gas emissions of organically farmed plant-based food were lower than conventionally farmed plant-based food. The greenhouse gas costs of organically produced meat were approximately the same as non-organically produced meat. However, the same paper noted that a shift from conventional to organic practices would likely be beneficial for long-term efficiency and ecosystem services, and probably improve soil over time.

Recent research has suggested that the usage of organic fertilizers and cover crops can enhance soil organic carbon, nutrient cycling, and biodiversity. Simultaneously, it could also reduce greenhouse gas emissions when it is managed effectively. These practices contribute to climate change mitigation and sustainable agriculture when improving soil resilience and long-term fertility. [Khan et al., 2024]

A 2019 life-cycle assessment study found that converting the total agricultural sector (both crop and livestock production) for England and Wales to organic farming methods would result in a net increase in greenhouse gas emissions as increased overseas land use for production and import of crops would be needed to make up for lower organic yields domestically.

There are positive and negative environmental impacts of organic as compared to conventional farming. A meta-analysis of European studies revealed that in general, organic farming resulted in higher soil organic matter, lower nitrogen losses per hectare, and lower energy inputs. Others however, such as land use, nutrient pollution and greenhouse gas emissions were higher when measured per unit of agricultural output, highlighting the importance of the measurement method and farming system.

Biodiversity can also be promoted by organic farming. In a meta-analysis of 94 studies (average across all studies) it was concluded that organic farming resulted in around 30% more species richness than conventional farming, but this effect was different for each organism, crop, and landscape.

=== Local food systems ===
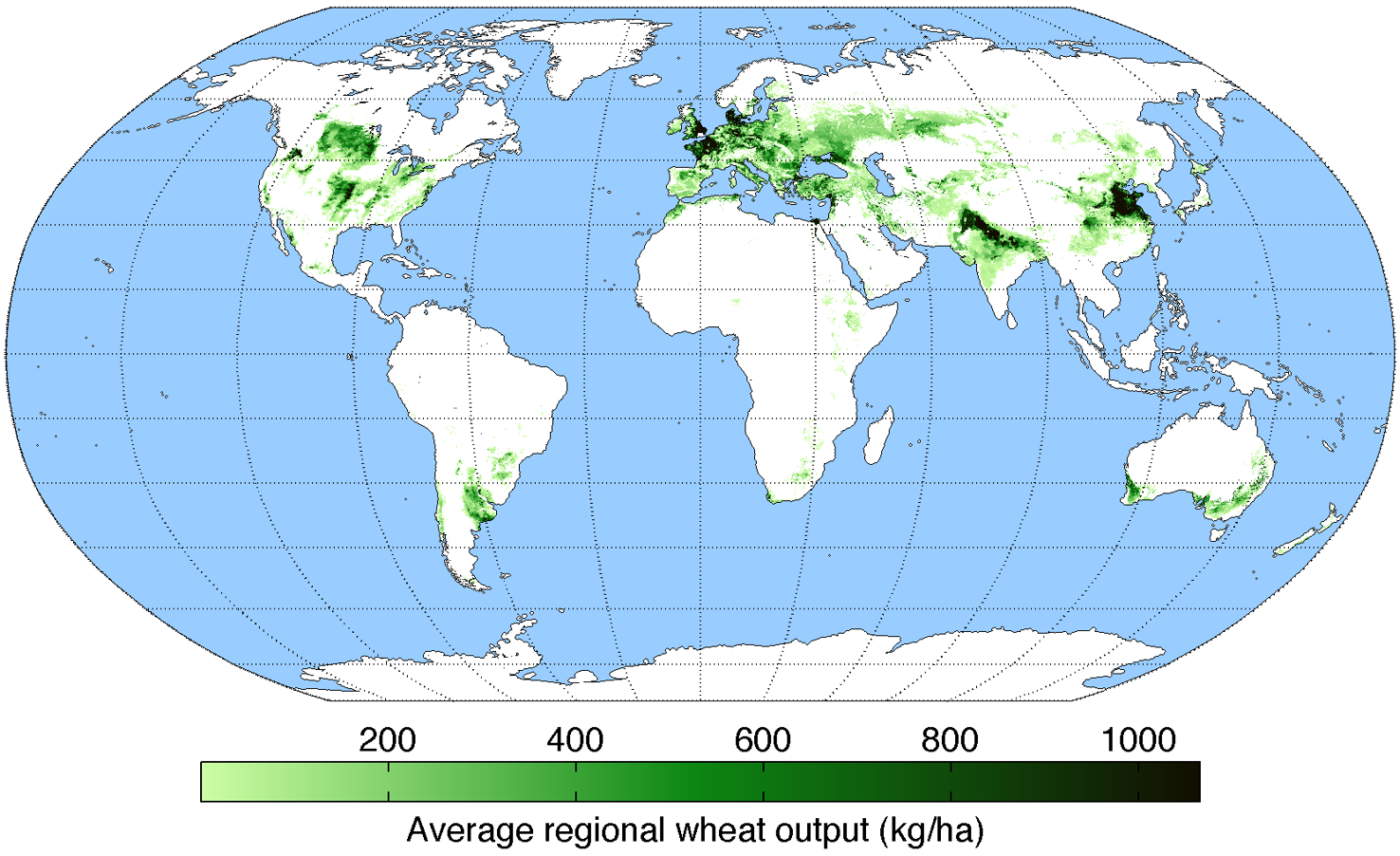
A map of wheat production (average percentage of land used for its production times average yield in each grid cell) across the world.

In local and regional food systems, food is produced, distributed, and consumed locally. This type of system can be beneficial both to the consumer (by providing fresher and more sustainably grown product) and to the farmer (by fetching higher prices and giving more direct access to consumer feedback). Local and regional food systems can face challenges arising from inadequate institutions or programs, geographic limitations of producing certain crops, and seasonal fluctuations which can affect product demand within regions. In addition, direct marketing also faces challenges of accessibility, coordination, and awareness.

Farmers' markets, which have increased in number over the past two decades, are designed for supporting local farmers in selling their fresh products to consumers who are willing to buy. Food hubs are also similar locations where farmers deliver products and consumers come to pick them up. Consumers who wish to have weekly produce delivered can buy shares through a system called Community-Supported Agriculture (CSA). However, these farmers' markets also face challenges with marketing needs such as starting up, advertisement, payments, processing, and regulations.

There are various movements working towards local food production, more productive use of urban wastelands and domestic gardens including permaculture, guerilla gardening, urban horticulture, local food, slow food, sustainable gardening, and organic gardening.

Debates over local food system efficiency and sustainability have risen as these systems decrease transportation, which is a strategy for combating environmental footprints and climate change. A popular argument is that the less impactful footprint of food products from local markets on communities and environment. Main factors behind climate change include land use practices and greenhouse emissions, as global food systems produce approximately 33% of theses emissions. Compared to transportation in a local food system, a conventional system takes more fuel for energy and emits more pollution, such as carbon dioxide. This transportation also includes miles for agricultural products to help with agriculture and depends on factors such as transportation sizes, modes, and fuel types. Some airplane importations have shown to be more efficient than local food systems in some cases. Overall, local food systems can often support better environmental practices.

==== Environmental impact of food miles ====
Studies found that food miles are a relatively minor factor of carbon emissions; albeit increased food localization may also enable additional, more significant environmental benefits such as recycling of energy, water, and nutrients. For specific foods, regional differences in harvest seasons may make it more environmentally friendly to import from distant regions than more local production and storage or local production in greenhouses. This may vary depending on the environmental standards in the respective country, the distance of the respective countries and on a case-by-case basis for different foods.

However, a 2022 study suggests global food miles' CO_{2} emissions are 3.5–7.5 times higher than previously estimated, with transport accounting for about 19% of total food-system emissions, though shifting towards plant-based diets remains substantially more important. The study concludes that "a shift towards plant-based foods must be coupled with more locally produced items, mainly in affluent countries".

== Food distribution ==
In food distribution, increasing food supply is a production problem, as it takes time for products to get marketed, and as they wait to get distributed the food goes to waste. Despite the fact that throughout all food production an estimated 20-30% of food is wasted, there have been efforts to combat this issue, such as campaigns conducted to promote limiting food waste. However, due to insufficient facilities and practices as well as huge amounts of food going unmarketed or harvested due to prices or quality, food is wasted through each phase of its distribution. Another factor for lack of sustainability within food distribution includes transportation in combination with inadequate methods for food handling throughout the packing process. Additionally, poor or long conditions for food in storage and consumer waste add to this list of factors for inefficiency found in food distribution. In 2019, though global production of calories kept pace with population growth, there are still more than 820 million people who have insufficient food and many more consume low-quality diets leading to micronutrient deficiencies.

Some modern tendencies in food distribution also create bounds in which problems are created and solutions must be formed. One factor includes growth of large-scale producing and selling units in bulk to chain stores which displays merchandising power from large scale market organizations as well as their mergence with manufactures. In response to production, another factor includes large scale distribution and buying units among manufacturers in development of food distribution, which also affects producers, distributors, and consumers. Another main factor involves protecting public interest, which means better adaptation for product and service, resulting in rapid development of food distribution. A further factor revolves around price maintenance, which creates pressure for lower prices, resulting in higher drive for lower cost throughout the whole food distribution process. An additional factor comprises new changes and forms of newly invented technical processes such as developments of freezing food, discovered through experiments, to help with distribution efficiency. Another factor is new technical developments in distributing machinery to meet the influence of consumer demands and economic factors. Lastly, one more factor includes government relation to businesses and those who petition against it in correlation with anti-trust laws due to large scale business organizations and the fear of monopoly contributing to changing public attitude.

In medium/high income countries, retailers discard an excess of food waste that is viable for human consumption. For example, in the EU an estimated 4 million tons of food is wasted anuually by the Retail/Wholesale sector, which is equivalent to 8kg per capita. Unreasonably high food standards contribute to this waste. For example, it is estimated that half of the edible supply of Zimbabwean mango is thrown out due to failure of aromatic and visual standards.

== Food security, nutrition and diet ==
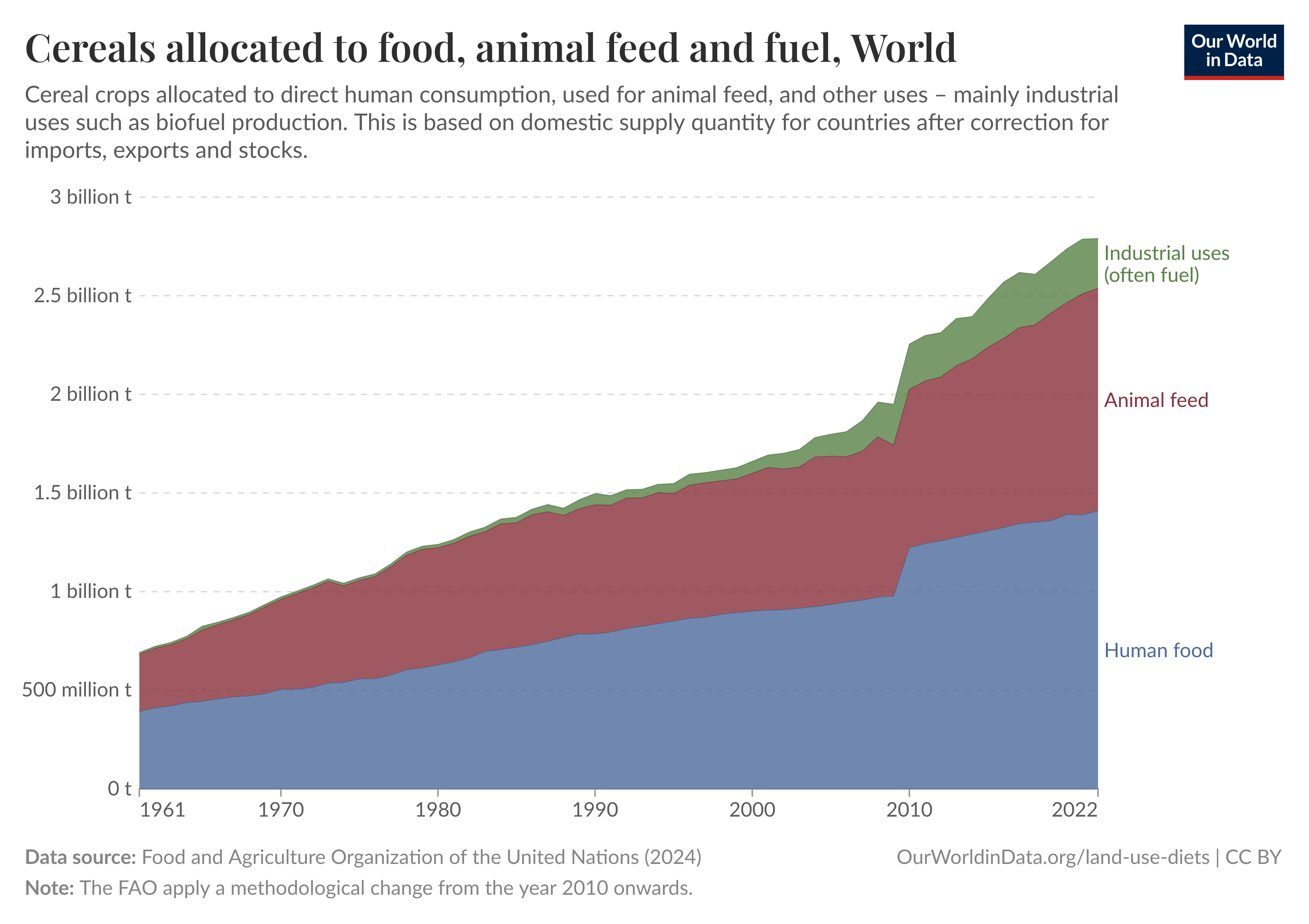
Cereal-use statistic showing an estimated large fraction of crops used as fodder.

The environmental effects of different dietary patterns depend on many factors, including the proportion of animal and plant foods consumed and the method of food production. At the same time, current and future food systems need to be provided with sufficient nutrition for not only the current population, but future population growth in light of a world affected by changing climate in the face of global warming.

Nearly one in seven households in the United States have experienced food insecurity in 2023. Of the nearly 132.5 million U.S. households, 13.5% (18.0 million) have reported experiencing some level of food insecurity over the course of 2023. Furthermore, 17.9% of households with children in them reported food insecurity in the year 2023. In all, around 47.4 million people in the U.S. experienced food insecurity struggles. While these figures have increased relative to previous years, they are still below peaks of food insecurity during the 2010s and the COVID-19 pandemic.

The "global land squeeze" for agricultural land also has impacts on food security. Likewise, effects of climate change on agriculture can result in lower crop yields and nutritional quality due to for example drought, heat waves and flooding as well as increases in water scarcity, pests and plant diseases. Soil conservation may be important for food security as well. For sustainability and food security, the food system would need to adapt to such current and future problems.

According to one estimate, "just four corporations control 90% of the global grain trade" and researchers have argued that the food system is too fragile due to various issues, such as "massive food producers" (i.e. market-mechanisms) having too much power and nations "polarising into super-importers and super-exporters". However the impact of market power on the food system is contested with other claiming more complex context dependent outcomes.

== Production decision-making ==
In the food industry, especially in agriculture, there has been a rise in problems toward the production of some food products. For instance, growing vegetables and fruits has become more expensive. It is difficult to grow some agricultural crops because some have a preferable climate condition for developing. There has also been an incline on food shortages as production has decreased. Though the world still produces enough food for the population, not everyone receives good quality food because it is not accessible to them, since it depends on their location and/or income. In addition, the number of overweight people has increased, and there are about 2 billion people that are underfed worldwide. This shows how the global food system lacks quantity and quality according to the food consumption patterns.

A study estimated that "relocating current croplands to [environmentally] optimal locations, whilst allowing ecosystems in then-abandoned areas to regenerate, could simultaneously decrease the current carbon, biodiversity, and irrigation water footprint of global crop production by 71%, 87%, and 100%", with relocation only within national borders also having substantial potential.

Policies, including ones that affect consumption, may affect production-decisions such as which foods are produced to various degrees and in various indirect and direct ways. Individual studies have named several proposed options of such and the restricted website Project Drawdown has aggregated and preliminarily evaluated some of these measures.

=== Climate change adaptation ===
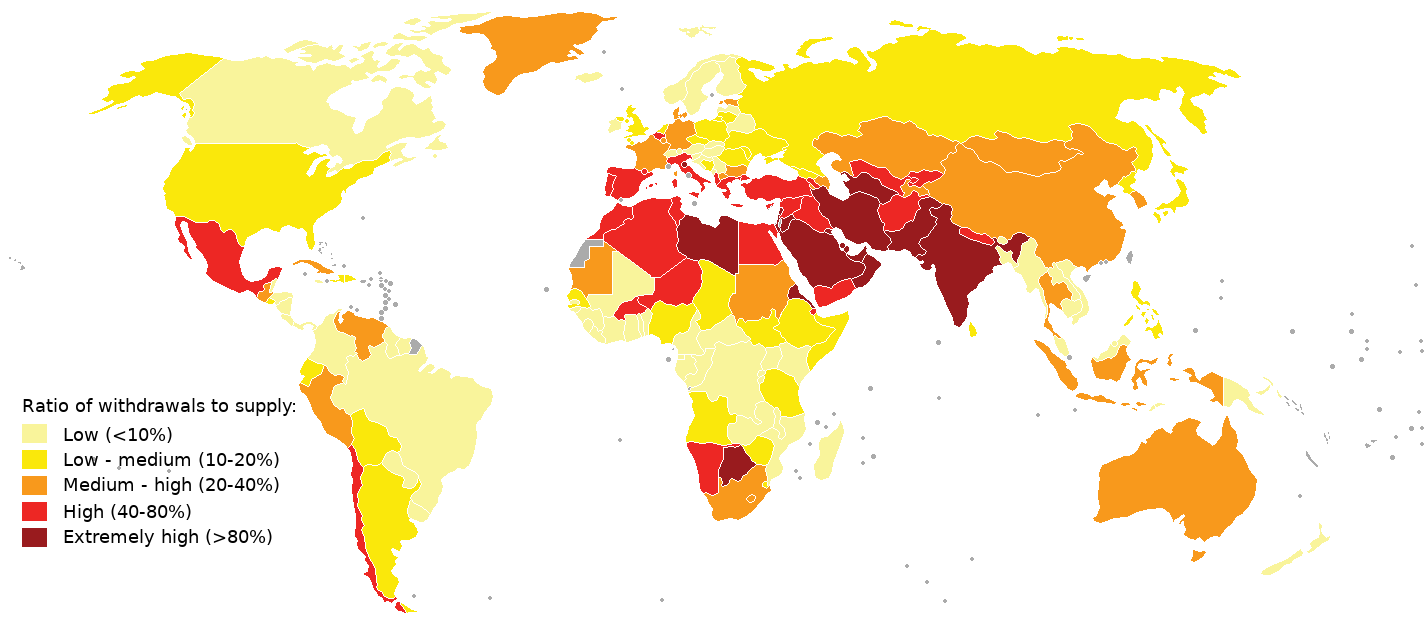
Water stress per country in 2019. Water stress is the ratio of water use relative to water availability ("demand-driven scarcity").

Climate change is altering global rainfall patterns. This affects agriculture. Rainfed agriculture accounts for 80% of global agriculture. Many of the 852 million poor people in the world live in parts of Asia and Africa that depend on rainfall to cultivate food crops. Climate change will modify rainfall, evaporation, runoff, and soil moisture storage. Extended drought can cause the failure of small and marginal farms. This results in increased economic, political, and social disruption.

Water availability, including changes in total seasonal precipitation or its pattern of variability, influences agriculture. Moisture stress during flowering, pollination, and grain-filling harms most crops. It is particularly harmful to corn, soybeans, and wheat. Increased evaporation from the soil and accelerated transpiration in the plants themselves will cause moisture stress.

There are many adaptation options. One is to develop crop varieties with greater drought tolerance and another is to build local rainwater storage. Using small planting basins to harvest water in Zimbabwe has boosted maize yields. This happens whether rainfall is abundant or scarce. In Niger, they have led to three or fourfold increases in millet yields. Additionally, a 2023 study in southwestern Ethiopia showed that giving farmers access to agricultural extension services and climate information significantly increases their adoption of adaptation strategies, such as crop diversification and the use of drought resistant crops.

Digital technologies allow farmers to adapt to changing rainfall patterns through remote sensing of soil moisture, IoT-based irrigation control, and data analytics for rainfall forecasting.

Climate change can threaten food security and water security. It is possible to adapt food systems to improve food security and prevent negative impacts from climate change in the future.

== Food waste ==
According to the Food and Agriculture Organization (FAO), food waste is responsible for 8 percent of global human-made greenhouse gas emissions. The FAO concludes that nearly 30 percent of all available agricultural land in the world – 1.4 billion hectares – is used for produced but uneaten food. The global blue water footprint of food waste is 250 km^{3}, the amount of water that flows annually through the Volga or three times Lake Geneva.

There are several factors that explain how food waste has increased globally in food systems. The main factor is population, because as population increases more food is being made, but most food produced goes to waste. Rise in food delivery services and online sale of food products has increased food waste, especially following the COVID-19 pandemic. In addition, not all countries have the same resources to provide the best quality of food. According to a study done in 2010, private households produce the largest amounts of food waste across the globe. Another major factor is overproduction; the rate of food production is significantly higher than the rate of consumption, leading to a surplus of food waste. In developing areas, food waste is high because of short harvest seasons and excess crop production during those seasons. For produce that spoils easily, like mangoes and tomatoes, this leads to a sharp supply increase, causing over 40% of fruit to go to waste before it can be sold.

Food waste occurs within different income levels of countries and share equivalent scales in both developed and undeveloped countries. In developed countries, 40% of food losses occur at the consumer level. On the other hand, in developing countries 40% of food losses occur at the post harvest stages. This is outlines that food waste happens at the same level in all nations, however the process in which it is wasted is different. This relates to the level of income of each individual. In developed countries, food waste is more on a per capita basis.

However, high income countries food systems still may deal with other issues such as food security. This demonstrates how all food systems have their weaknesses and strengths. Climate change causes food waste to increase because the warm temperature causes crops to dry faster and creates a higher risk for fires. Food waste can occur any time throughout production. According to the World Wildlife Organization, since most food produced goes to landfills, when it rots it causes methane to be produced. The disposal of food has a big impact on our environment and health.

== Academic study ==
The study of sustainable food applies systems theory and methods of sustainable design towards food systems. As an interdisciplinary field, the study of sustainable food systems has been growing in the last several decades, and many universities offer programs focused on the area.

There is a debate about "establishing a body akin to the Intergovernmental Panel on Climate Change (IPCC) for food systems" which "would respond to questions from policymakers and produce advice based on a synthesis of the available evidence" while identifying "gaps in the science that need addressing".

== Public policy ==
=== United States of America ===
In September 2015 the United States Environmental Protection Agency (EPA) set a 15 year goal to cut domestic food waste in half by 2030. The EPA asserts that the US wastes about 30-40% of food a year and that redirecting food waste is insufficient to stopping environmental impact as around 85% of greenhouse gas emissions surrounding the waste is produced prior to the waste occurring.

In the wake of COVID food supply issues, an effort to develop sustainable food systems in the U.S. by the Biden-Harris administration implemented $5 billion dollars of funding to develop food chain sustainability and access to people across the country. The funding prioritizes climate resilience and midsized production growth to reduce food waste byproduct. The Biden Administration allocated $1.7 billion towards climate-smart agriculture, $1.1 billion towards rural infrastructure, and $2 billion in investments to partner with rural communities to create jobs and support rural-led economic development.

In January 2023 the U.S Congress passed the Zero Food Waste Act. Mandating that the Environmental Protection Agency allocate grant money for food waste research, the bill aids in supporting the 2030 food waste reduction agenda.

In March 2023 the U.S. Congress passed the Agriculture Resilience Act which mandated expansions in the services and programs overseen by the USDA. The act outlines a deeper scope for USDA conservation efforts in early food chain stages and livestock pollution research.

In March 2025 the U.S. Congressed passed the Reduce Food Loss and Waste Act. The bill requires the USDA to start a voluntary certification program that would prevent food waste through promoting surplus food donation, novel disposal methods like composting and animal feed, and cooperation with the FDA and EPA under an amended 2020 agreement.

=== European Union ===
Multiple policies guide and govern the different aspects and sectors of the EU's food system, some of which address managing the impacts of climate change on food production and food security. For example, the EU Soil Strategy for 2030 lays out the plan to achieve healthy soils for food provision and climate mitigation, while the Common Agricultural Policy provides risk management instruments and an annual crisis reserve to support farmers. However, many parts of the food system, such as processing and retail, lack EU policies that would address the risks of climate change.

The EU's Scientific Advice Mechanism and its Chief Scientific Advisors stated that adapting the European food system for the future should be a high priority for the EU, and delivered multiple scientific opinions on how to transition. In 2020, the EU published its strategy for transitioning to a sustainable food system, called Farm-to-Fork, but in 2025 this was replaced by the Vision for Agriculture and Food, which shifted the emphasis to competitiveness and simplifying regulations.

=== Global ===
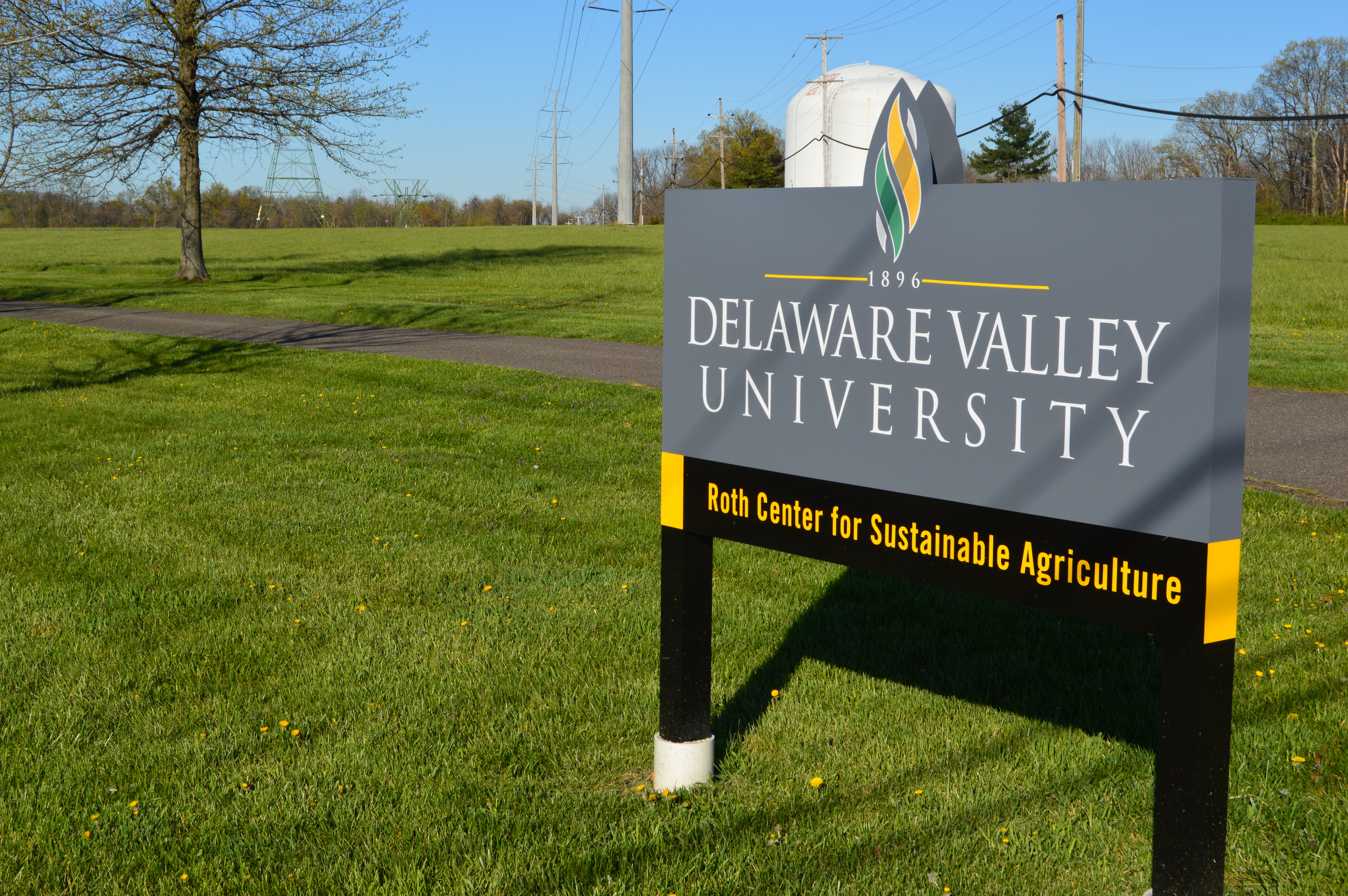
Delaware Valley University's "Roth Center for Sustainable Agriculture", located in Montgomery County, Pennsylvania.

Sustainable agriculture is a topic in international policy concerning its potential to reduce environmental risks. In 2011, the Commission on Sustainable Agriculture and Climate Change, as part of its recommendations for policymakers on achieving food security in the face of climate change, urged that sustainable agriculture must be integrated into national and international policy.

The Commission stressed that increasing weather variability and climate shocks will negatively affect agricultural yields, necessitating early action to drive change in agricultural production systems towards increasing resilience. It also called for dramatically increased investments in sustainable agriculture in the next decade, including in national research and development budgets, land rehabilitation, economic incentives, and infrastructure improvement.

During 2021 United Nations Climate Change Conference, 45 countries pledged to give more than 4 billion dollars for transition to sustainable agriculture. The organization "Slow Food" expressed concern about the effectivity of the spendings, as they concentrate on technological solutions and reforestation en place of "a holistic agroecology that transforms food from a mass-produced commodity into part of a sustainable system that works within natural boundaries."

Additionally, the Summit consisted of negotiations that led to heavily reducing CO_{2} emissions, becoming carbon neutral, ending deforestation and reliance on coal, and limiting methane emissions.

In November, the Climate Action Tracker reported that global efforts are on track to for a 2.7 °C temperature increase with current policies, finding that the current targets will not meet global needs as coal and natural gas consumption are primarily responsible for the gap in progress. Since, like-minded developing countries, like those in Africa, asked for an addendum to the agreement that removed the obligation for developing countries to meet the same requirements of wealthy nations.

=== Asia ===
==== China ====
In 2016, the Chinese government adopted a plan to reduce China's meat consumption by 50%, for achieving more sustainable and healthy food system.

In 2019, the National Basic Research Program or Program 973 funded research into Science and Technology Backyard (STB). STBs are hubs often created in rural areas with significant rates of small-scale farming that combine knowledge of traditional practices with new innovations and technology implementation. The purpose of this program was to invest in sustainable farming throughout the country and increase food production while achieving few negative environmental effects. The program was ultimately proven to be successful, and the study found that the merging of traditional practices and appropriate technology was instrumental in higher crop yields.

==== India ====
In collaboration with the Food and Land Use Coalition (FOLU), CEEW (council for energy, environment and water), has given an overview of the current state of sustainable agriculture practices and systems (SAPSs) in India. India is aiming to scale-up SAPs, through policymakers, administrators, philanthropists, and other which represent a vital alternative to conventional, input-intensive agriculture. In idea these efforts identify 16 SAPSs – including agroforestry, crop rotation, rainwater harvesting, organic farming and natural farming – using agroecology as an investigative lens. In a conclusive understanding it is realised that sustainable agriculture is far from mainstream in India. Further proposals for several measures for promoting SAPSs, including restructured government support and rigorous evidence generation for benefits and implementation of sustainable farming are ongoing progress in Indian Agriculture.

An example of initiatives in India towards exploring the world of sustainable farming has been set by the Sowgood foundation which is a nonprofit founded by educator Pragati Chaswal. It started by teaching primary school children about sustainable farming by helping them farm on small farm strips in suburban farmhouses and gardens. Today many government and private schools in Delhi, India have adopted the sowgood foundation curriculum for sustainable farming for their students.

== See also ==
- Hemp juice
- Standardization#Environmental protection
