= Campa (juice brand) =

Georgian beverage company

- Product type: Juice
- Country: Georgia
- Introduced: 2008
- Markets: Georgia; European Union; Central Asia; Middle East
- Website: www.campa.ge/en

Campa (Georgian: კამპა) is a Georgian beverage company founded in 2008 and headquartered in Saguramo, Georgia. The company produces fruit juices, nectars, and functional drinks under the brands Campa, Chveni, and Frutata. Campa is recognized as one of the leading juice producers in Georgia and exports its products to markets including the United States, Azerbaijan, China, the United Arab Emirates, and Russia.

== Founding and development ==
Campa was established in 2008 and launched its first products on the Georgian market in 2009. The company was founded as a family-owned business and has since developed into one of the country’s prominent juice and nectar producers.

Its production facilities are located in Saguramo, near Tbilisi, where Campa implemented aseptic processing technology for extended shelf life and preservation of natural flavors.

Since its founding, Campa has expanded its portfolio to multiple brands, including Campa, Chveni, and Frutata.

== Products and production ==
Campa produces a wide variety of fruit juices, nectars, and functional drinks, available in Tetra Pak cartons (1 L and 0.2 L) and in glass bottles (250 ml and 750 ml). The company’s portfolio includes between 14 and 25 stock keeping units (SKUs), covering flavors such as apple, cherry, pomegranate, peach, orange, and mango.

Campa employs aseptic processing technology to extend shelf life while preserving natural taste and nutritional value. Its production facilities operate under ISO 22000 food safety standards.
