= Multistakeholder governance =

Collaborative management for governance

Multistakeholder governance is a practice of governance that employs bringing multiple stakeholders together to participate in dialogue, decision making, and implementation of responses to jointly perceived problems. The principle behind such a structure is that if enough input is provided by multiple types of actors involved in a question, the eventual consensual decision gains more legitimacy, and can be more effectively implemented than a traditional state-based response. While the evolution of multistakeholder governance is occurring principally at the international level, public-private partnerships (PPPs) are domestic analogues.

Stakeholders refer to a collection of actors from different social, political, economic spheres working intentionally together to govern a physical, social, economic, or policy area. The range of actors can include multinational corporations, national enterprises, governments, civil society bodies, academic experts, community leaders, religious figures, media personalities and other institutional groups.

At a minimum a multistakeholder group must have two or more actors from different social, political, or economic groups. If not, then the group is a trade association (all business groups), a multilateral body (all governments), a professional body (all scholars), etc. Almost all multistakeholder bodies have at least one multinational corporation or business-affiliated body and at least one civil society organization or alliance of civil society organizations as key members.

Alternative terminologies for multistakeholder governance include multi-stakeholder initiatives(MSIs), Multi-StakeHolder (MSH), multi-stakeholder processes (MSPs), public-private partnerships (PPPs), transnational multistakeholder Partnerships (transnational MSPs), informal governance arrangements, and non-state regulation.

The key term 'multistakeholder' (or 'multistakeholderism') is increasingly spelled without a hyphen to maintain consistency with its predecessor 'multilateralism' and to associate this new form of governance with one of the key actors involved that is also generally spelled without a hyphen; 'multinationals'. 'Multistakeholderism' is similarly used in parallel to bilateralism and regionalism.

As an evolving global governance form, only a limited number of organizations and institutions are involved in multistakeholderism. In a number of arenas, opposing forces are actively challenging the legitimacy, accountability, and effectiveness of these experimental changes in global governance.

== Contemporary history and theory ==
Stakeholder management theory, stakeholder project management theory, and stakeholder government agency theory have all contributed to the intellectual foundation for multistakeholder governance. The history and theory of multistakeholder governance however departs from these models in four ways. The earlier theories describe how a central institution (be it a business, a project, or a government agency) should engage more formally with related institutions (be it other organizations, institutions, or communities). In multistakeholder governance, the central element of multistakeholder undertaking is a public concern (e.g. protection of the climate, management of the internet, or the use of natural resources), not a pre-existing organization. Second, the earlier theories aimed to strengthen a pre-existing institution. In multistakeholder governance, multistakeholder groups can strengthen associated institutions but they can also marginalize institutions or functions of existing governance bodies (e.g. governmental regulatory authorities, UN system). As earlier theories were concerned with improving the operations of corporations and project management, they did not need to address the public governance consequences of multistakeholder decision-making. They also provide little or no guidance to autonomous multistakeholder groups on their internal rules of governance, as the pre-existing institution had its own functioning decision-making system.

As multistakeholderism is an evolving system of governance, a good deal of its theoretical underpinning is a combination of formal theoretical writing and theory-derived from practice.

=== World Economic Forum's Global Redesign Initiative ===
The most extensive theoretical writing and most detailed practical proposals comes from the World Economic Forum's Global Redesign Initiative (GRI). Its 2010 600-page report "Everybody's Business: Strengthening International Cooperation in a More Interdependent World" was a comprehensive proposal for re-designing global governance. The report sought to change in fundamental ways the global governance system built since World War II. The report authored by the leadership of the World Economic Forum, including Klaus Schwab, is a series of broad policy papers on multistakeholder governance and a broad array of theme-specific policy options. These policy and thematic program recommendations were designed to display the new governance structure's ability to respond to a range of global crises. These global policy areas include investment flows; educational systems; systemic financial risk; philanthropy and social investing; emerging multinationals; fragile states; social entrepreneurship; energy security; international security cooperation; mining and metals; the future of government; ocean governance; and ethical values. What sets the World Economic Forum's proposal apart is that it was developed as a cooperative effort involving 750 experts from the international business, governmental, and academic communities working in sixty separate task forces for one and a half years (2009/2010).

WEF also had over fifty years' experience convening leading stakeholders from the political, economic, cultural, civil society, religious, and other communities to discuss the way forward in global affairs. As the three co-chairs observed in their introduction to the GRI report: "The time has come for a new stakeholder paradigm of international governance analogous to that embodied in the stakeholder theory of corporate governance on which the World Economic Forum itself was founded."

=== Intergovernmental bodies in the UN system ===
The United Nations effort to develop multistakeholder governance is widely regarded to have started with the 1992 U.N. Conference on Environment and Development (more commonly known at the Rio Conference). There, governments created nine major non-state groups which could be part of the official intergovernmental process. Ten years later in Johannesburg the follow-up conference created a new multistakeholder implementation process called officially "type II conference outcomes," where transnational corporations, NGOs, and governments pledged to work together to implement a specific section of the conference report.

A separate government effort to define multistakeholder governance has been a series of United Nations General Assembly resolutions on 'partnerships'. The earliest resolution (2002) drew "the attention of Member States to multi-stakeholder initiatives, in particular, the Global Compact Initiative of the Secretary-General, the Global Alliance for Vaccines and Immunizations, the multi-stakeholder dialogue process of the Commission on Sustainable Development and the Information and Communication Technologies Task Force". Over the next 17 years until 2019, the governments at the United Nations continued to evolve their understanding of multistakeholder governance by adopting eight other related resolutions.

In the most recent partnership resolution from 2019, governments identified a number of principles that should define a multistakeholder partnership. Governments "stresse[d] ...[A partnership should have a] common purpose, transparency, bestowing no unfair advantages upon any partner of the United Nations, mutual benefit and mutual respect, accountability, respect for the modalities of the United Nations, striving for balanced representation of relevant partners from developed and developing countries and countries with economies in transition, and not compromising the independence and neutrality of the United Nations system in general and the agencies in particular".

In the same resolution, government further defined the 'common purpose' and 'mutual benefit and respect' as voluntary partnerships and as "collaborative relationships between various parties, both public and non-public, in which all participants agree to work together to achieve a common purpose or undertake a specific task and, as mutually agreed, to share risks and responsibilities, resources and benefits".

=== Civil society organizations within the UN system ===
Civil society organizations have had a series of parallel but distinct exchanges on the theory and practice of multistakeholder governance. Two elements of the definition of multistakeholder governance that are not central to the intergovernmental debate are (1) the connection between democracy and multistakeholder governance and (2) the assessment of the efficiency and effectiveness of multistakeholder projects.

In 2019 Felix Dodds, a founder of the Stakeholder Forum, argued that "involving stakeholders in the decision-making process makes them more likely to partner with each other and with governments at all levels to help deliver on the commitments associated with [intergovernmentally adopted] agreements". In this perspective, the evolution of multistakeholder governance marks a positive transformation from representative democracy to stakeholder-based participatory democracy.

The 2019 Transnational Institute (TNI) in Amsterdam report on multistakeholderism takes a different perspective. It considers that democracy is at great risk from multistakeholder governance. TNI sees the lack of a legitimate public selection process for 'stakeholders'; the inherent power imbalance between categories of 'stakeholders', particularly transnational corporations and community groups; and the intrusion of business interests in formal international decision-making as counter to the development of a globally representative democratic system. Gleckman, an associate of TNI and a senior fellow at the Center for Governance and Sustainability, UMass-Boston, advances other arguments on the inherently un-democratic character of multistakeholder governance.

=== International commissions ===
The 1991-1994 Commission on Global Governance, the 2003-2007 Helsinki Process on Globalisation and Democracy., and the 1998-2001 World Commission on Dams each addressed the evolution of the concept of multistakeholderism as a force in global governance.

For example, The World Commission on Dams (WCD) was established in 1998 as a global multistakeholder body by the World Bank and the World Conservation Union (IUCN) in response to growing opposition to large dam projects. The twelve Commission members came from a variety of backgrounds, representing a broad spectrum of interests in large dams – including governments and nongovernmental organizations (NGOs), dam operators and grassroots people's movements, corporations and academics, industry associations and consultants.

In WCD's final report from 2000, the chair Professor Kader Asmal described the Commissioners' views about multistakeholder governance this way: "We are a Commission to heal the deep and self-inflicted wounds torn open wherever and whenever far too few determine for far too many how best to develop or use water and energy resources. That is often the nature of power, and the motivation of those who question it. Most recently governments, industry and aid agencies have been challenged around the world for deciding the destiny of millions without including the poor, or even popular majorities of countries they believe to be helping. To confer legitimacy on such epochal decisions, real development must be people centred, while respecting the role of the state as mediating, and often representing, their interests...we do not endorse globalisation as led from above by a few men. We do endorse globalisation as led from below by all, a new approach to global water policy and development".

=== Key parties in internet governance ===
The role of multistakeholder processes in internet governance dominated the 2003-2005 World Summit on the Information Society (WSIS). However the summit failed to address the digital divide to the satisfaction of developing countries.

The final outcome of the Summit, the Tunis Agenda (2005), enshrined a particular type of multistakeholder model for Internet governance, in which, at the urging of the United States, the key function of administration and management of naming and addressing was delegated to the private sector, the Internet Corporation for Assigned Names and Numbers (ICANN).

This US policy of using multistakeholder processes in effect to favor privatization of functions which had been traditionally performed by government agencies was well expressed in a 2015 statement by Julie Napier Zoller, a senior official in the US Department of State's Bureau of Economic and Business Affairs. She argued that "Every meeting that is enriched by multistakeholder participation serves as an example and a precedent that opens doors for multistakeholder participation in future meetings and fora."

== Definition of a 'stakeholder' ==
There are generally accepted definitions for 'stakeholder' in management theory and generally accepted processes for selecting 'stakeholders' in project management theory. However, there are no commonly accepted definition of 'stakeholder' and no generally recognized process to designate 'stakeholders' in multistakeholder governance. In a democracy, there is only one elemental category for public decision-making, the 'citizen'. Unlike the concept of 'citizen' in democratic governance theory, the concept of 'stakeholder' in multistakeholder governance theory and practice remains unsettled and ambiguous.

In multistakeholder governance, there are three tiers of 'stakeholder' definitions: (1) the definition of the 'stakeholder category' (e.g. business); (2) the definition or the specification for selecting organizations or institutions within a 'stakeholder category' (e.g. micro-enterprises or women-owned businesses); and (3) the definition or the specification for selecting an individual person to represent a designated organization or institution within a stakeholder category (e.g. the CEO, the external affairs officer, or a professional staff member). In practice it is common for the founders of a multistakeholder groups to select a key individual to be a member of a multistakeholder group and then retroactively classify that individual and/or the individual's organization into an appropriate definitional category.

=== Multiple definitions of categories of stakeholders within the UN system ===
At the United Nations Rio conference in 1992, governments formally accepted nine Major Groups as 'stakeholder' categories. The designated Major Groups were Women, Children and Youth, Indigenous Peoples, Non-Governmental Organizations, Local Authorities, Workers and Trade Unions, Business and Industry, Scientific and Technological Community, and Farmers. Two decades later, the importance of effectively engaging these nine sectors of society was reaffirmed by the Rio+20 Conference. However that conference added other stakeholders, including local communities, volunteer groups and foundations, migrants and families, as well as older persons and persons with disabilities. Subsequently, governments also added as stakeholders private philanthropic organizations, educational and academic entities and other stakeholders active in areas related to sustainable development. The 'Major Groups' designation is now cited as 'Major Groups and Other Stakeholders'.

The International Labour Organization (ILO)'s governance system functions with just three constituencies: 'workers', 'business', and 'government'. In this tri-partite arrangement, workers and business are on the same footing as governments.

The Committee on World Food Security (CFS) has different main categories: 'Members', 'Participants’ and 'Observers'. The CFS sees itself as "the foremost inclusive international and intergovernmental platform for all stakeholders to work together to ensure food security and nutrition for all". Their 'Participants' category however includes a wide variety of social actors: (a) UN agencies and bodies, (b) civil society and non-governmental organizations and their networks, (c) international agricultural research systems, (d) international and regional financial institutions and (e) representatives of private sector associations and (f) private philanthropic foundations.

=== Multiple definitions of categories of stakeholders outside the UN system (selected examples) ===
Unlike the multiple definitions inside the UN system, the definition of stakeholder categories for autonomous multistakeholder groups are generally versions of "interest-based" definitions. International Organization for Standardization (ISO) defines a stakeholder individual or group "as one that has an interest in any decision or activity of an organization" (ISO 26000). Hemmati, a co-founder of the MSP Institute, a multistakeholder support organization, defines stakeholders as "those who have an interest in a particular decision, either as individuals or representatives of a group. This includes people who influence a decision, or can influence it, as well as those affected by it. The trade association of international environmental and social standard setting bodies, ISEAL, defines stakeholder groups as those "that are likely to have an interest in the standard or that are likely to be affected by its implementation, and provides them with mechanisms for participation that are appropriate and accessible."

=== Multiple definitions used to select organizations within individual stakeholder categories ===
There is also no consistent definition or selection process to define the individual organization(s) that may "represent" a given category of stakeholders in a given multistakeholder group. For example, the 'government' category can involve government offices at the national, regional, county/provincial and municipal levels, regional inter-government organizations (e.g. European Commission, Organization of American States), intergovernmental secretariats (e.g. FAO, WHO) or include members of parliaments, regulatory bodies, technical experts in specific government departments and courts. The 'civil society' category could similarly involve non-state organizations at the international, regional and national levels, social movements, religious bodies, professional associations, development organizations, humanitarian groups or environmental NGOs.

The 'business' stakeholder category could mean multinational corporations, medium-sized national enterprises, small- and micro- local businesses, business trade associations at the international, national, or local level; businesses from developing countries, minority own businesses, women-owned enterprises or green global businesses. When 'academics' are a stakeholder category, the category members could be social scientists, physicists, philosophers, environmental experts, professors of religion, lawyers, university administrators, or a professional association affiliated with scholarly work.

=== Inclusive vs exclusive multistakeholder initiatives ===
At the G7 summit (Cornwall, UK, 11-13 June 2021) G7 leaders highlighted the importance of standards in line with their values and affirmed their support for "industry-led, inclusive multi-stakeholder approaches to standards setting". The definition 'inclusive' multi-stakeholder approach called for the use of common standards encouraging collaboration with International Organization for Standardization. ISO standards are voluntary consensus, therefore inclusive, developed using the core WTO Technical barriers to trade principles of transparency, openness, impartiality and consensus, effectiveness and relevance, coherence, and addressing the concerns of developing countries.

In comparison, the definition 'exclusive' multi-stakeholder approach, where multinational corporations in the private sector create exclusive multi-stakeholder initiatives, adopting non-consensus private standards and holding majority voting rights. Not meeting the WTO principles described above. Exclusive multi-stakeholder initiatives, adopting private standards are discussed a report from The Institute for Multi-Stakeholder Initiative Integrity (MSI Integrity), another example of an exclusive multi-stakeholder initiative adopting private standards is the Global Food Safety Initiative which is designed to define their benchmarking requirements thus controlling the minimum requirements in the schemes they recognize. The difference between international standards and private standards is explained by a publication from ISO.

=== Selection of representatives ===
Each organization designated to "represent" a stakeholder category can use its own method to select an individual to participate in a stakeholder group.

Having an individual from a given organization participate in the leadership of a multistakeholder group does not necessary mean that the sponsoring organization (be it a business, civil society organization or a government) is itself on board. The participation of any given individual may only mean that a particular office or department has chosen to work with that multistakeholder group. The individual involved may have been granted permission to liaise with a given multistakeholder group, provided leave to participate in their personal, professional capacity, or formally designated to represent a specific organization.

This ambiguity between commitment of the institution as a whole and the participation of a representative of a specific office or agency can affect a number of different roles inside and outside the multistakeholder group. The multistakeholder group may well appreciate being able to assert publicly that x governments or y transnational corporations are part of the multistakeholder group in order to garner greater political-economic recognition. Internally the other participants may believe that the institutional capacities and financial resources of the parent organization may be available to meet the goals of the multistakeholder group.

=== Uniquely governance issues in the use of the term 'stakeholder' ===
There is no on-going international effort to standardize the core multistakeholder governance concept of 'stakeholder', nor any international efforts to standardize the procedure for designating an organization or an individual within any given stakeholder category.

Unlike the use of 'stakeholder' in management theory and project management theory, there are a number of demographic, political, and social factors that can impact the use of the 'stakeholder' concept in governance. Among the identified issues are (a) the difficulty in balancing gender, class, ethnicity, and geographic representation in any given multistakeholder group; (b) the potential conflicts of interests between 'business' stakeholders and their commercial markets; (c) the asymmetric power of different categories of stakeholders and different organizations representing stakeholder categories within a multistakeholder group; and (d) the lack of a review structure or judicial mechanism to appeal the selection of stakeholder categories, stakeholder organizations within a category, or the selection of the person to represent a stakeholder organization.

== Types of groups ==
Multistakeholder governance arrangements are being used - or are being proposed to be used - to address a wide range of global, regional, and national challenges. These governance challenges, often ones that have a significant political, economic, or security impact can be categorized as the following - (1) those involving the formulation of public policies with minimal or marginal government participation; (2) those involved in setting market-governing standards that were previously a state function; and (3) those involved in implementing large-scale projects, often large-scale infrastructure projects, with government participation.

=== Policy-oriented groups ===
Policy-oriented multistakeholder governance groups are used to address an international policy issue. These groups tend to arise when global actors believe a policy intervention is necessary but governments or intergovernmental organizations are unwilling or unable to resolve a policy matter. Most multistakeholder governance groups meet independently of multilateral organizations, while some may include the multilateral system for their endorsement or support.

Examples of policy-oriented multistakeholder governance groups:

- World Economic Forum's Global Futures Councils
- World Commission on Dams
- Kimberley Process Certification Scheme
- Renewable Policy Network for the 21st Century
- Global Partnership for Oceans

=== Product, finance and process-oriented groups ===
Product, finance and process-oriented multistakeholder groups are organizations that set standards for internationally traded products and processes and/or provide financing with a multistakeholder board.

For products, the goal is to facilitate ethical, environmental, and development-friendly products that are desired by consumers and beneficial for producers, manufacturers and retailers.

Processes refer to new, rapidly evolving, complex and high impact technologies on the international market that lack domestic standards or regulatory oversight. The multistakeholder groups determine how the processes can best function internationally between competing commercial interests. These groups work with social justice civil society organizations, academic and government bodies to resolve conflicts and plan a path forward.

Unlike traditional philanthropic organizations, finance-oriented multistakeholder groups operate with a governing body that explicitly designates individuals to "represent" the views of specific stakeholder categories.

Examples of product-oriented multistakeholder groups:

- Aquaculture Stewardship Council (ASC)
- Better Cotton Initiative (BCI)
- Forest Stewardship Council (FSC)
- Global Coffee Platform (GCP)
- GoodWeave
- Marine Stewardship Council (MSC)
- Roundtable on Sustainable Biomaterials (RSB)
- Roundtable on Sustainable Palm Oil (RSPO)
- Initiative for Responsible Mining Assurance

Examples of process-oriented multistakeholder groups:

- Carnegie Climate Geoengineering Governance Initiative
- Consumer Goods Forum (CGF)
- Fairtrade International (FLO)
- FramingNano Project
- Global Food Safety Initiative (GFSI)
- Global Partnership for Business and Biodiversity
- ICANN
- Internet Governance Forum (IGF)

Examples of finance-oriented multistakeholder groups:

- GAVI, The Vaccine Alliance
- CGIAR (formerly the Consultative Group for International Agricultural Research)

=== Project-oriented groups ===
Project-oriented multistakeholder groups accomplish global or national tasks that governments or the multilateral system are unable to accomplish. Global project-oriented groups accomplish governance goals implemented by the multilateral system. National project-oriented groups address a public need that the relevant government is not able to fulfill. These may operate on the local, state, or national level. Project-oriented multistakeholder groups are frequently called public-private partnerships (PPP).

Examples of global project-oriented groups:

- Alliance for Water Stewardship
- Roll Back Malaria
- Accord on Fire and Building Safety in Bangladesh
- Global Alliance for Improved Nutrition
- The Global Polio Eradication Initiative
- The Global Fund to Fight AIDS, Tuberculosis and Malaria
- Sustainable Energy for All

Examples of where national project-oriented groups may act:

- Recreation areas
- Transportation infrastructure
- High-speed internet infrastructure
- Supply of municipal drinking water

== Relationship with ==
=== Multilateral system ===
Different parts of the multilateral system are involved in different ways with all three types of multistakeholder groups. These include multistakeholder bodies which are called for by an intergovernmental body (e.g. goal 17 of SDGs); multistakeholder bodies organized by and legally dependent on the secretariat of the UN system itself (e.g. Global Compact); multistakeholder bodies which offer to financially support certain UN goals and projects; UN affiliated project development organizations which regard multistakeholder implementation as more effective and efficient than state or UN system implementation; non-UN sponsored multistakeholder bodies which formally align themselves with the UN system (e.g. WEF strategic partnership) and non-UN sponsored multistakeholder bodies where UN system staff are allowed to serve in their personal, professional capacities.

On the other hand, some multistakeholder bodies are intentionally independent of the UN system. This form of disengagement from the UN system was formulated by the Global Redesign Initiative as ‘plurilateral, often multi-stakeholder, coalitions of the willing and able" to work outside the intergovernmental framework. Examples of this practice are multistakeholder bodies which explicitly seek autonomy from legally binding state regulations and the soft law of the intergovernmental system (e.g internet governance); standard setting multistakeholder bodies, which perceive that the UN system failed to address their concerns, consequently elect to operate without UN system engagement; and international multistakeholder funding sources which opt to be independent of the relevant intergovernmental process (e.g. GAVI).

Finally some multistakeholder bodies want to disengage from the UN system in their day to day activities but seek UN intergovernmental endorsement of the outcome of the autonomous arrangements (e.g. Kimberley Process Certification Scheme).

i. Multilateral institutions’ views of multistakeholder processes and governance

As an evolving global governance system, different parts of the UN system describe the importance of multistakeholderism in different ways. For example the World Bank notes multistakeholder initiatives bring together government, civil society, and the private sector to address complex development challenges that no one party alone has the capacity, resources, and know-how to do so more effectively; the Asian Development Bank asserts that multistakeholder groups allow communities to articulate their needs, help shape change processes and mobilize broad support for difficult reform; the Global Compact believes that convening committed companies with relevant experts and stakeholders, the UN can provide a collaborative space to generate and implement advanced corporate sustainability practice and inspire widespread uptake of sustainability solutions among businesses around the world; and SDG’s partnership goal (Goal 17) seeks to use multistakeholder partnerships to mobilize and share knowledge, expertise, technology and financial resources to implement the SDG program.

ii. Public policy concerns raised about multistakeholder engagement with the multilateral system

Some governments, civil society organizationss, and the international media have challenged the legitimacy and appropriateness of multistakeholder engagement with the multilateralism and have raised concerns that the integrity and legitimacy of the UN is endangered by multistakeholderism. They have contested a strategic partnership agreement between the office of the UN Secretary-General and the World Economic Forum; the planned hosting of international conferences that by-passes the traditional intergovernmental preparatory process for one centered on multistakeholder engagement with UN system secretariat (fn proposed World Food Summit); the shift for a bottom-up development to top-down multistakeholder-led development; the offer of free staff from the World Economic Forum to the Executive Director of a UN system treaty body; and the process of large international multistakeholder bodies setting global policy goals through their philanthropy.

=== Transnational corporations and industry-related organizations ===
Most transnational corporations (TNCs) and business-related organizations are not involved with multistakeholder groups. However, the business sector and large TNCs are all too often seen as essential participants in any multistakeholder undertaking.

Some of these firms see long-term benefits from multistakeholderism. For some, multistakeholder governance bodies are the preferred alternative to state-oversight or intergovernmentally-drafted soft law. For firms in sectors with a high negative profile, multistakeholder bodies can be useful instruments to identify solutions to complex difficulties or to re-establish public creditability for their firm or sector. For other firms, multistakeholder groups provide an institutional entry into global governance structures or an institutional arrangement outside of the UN system to lead in defining international policies and programs (e.g. WEF’s Shaping the Future Councils).

For other firms, the benefits are more short-term. The short-term benefits include working to shape the technical specification for a niche international market; creating public acceptability and expectations for new markets; and managing the public perceptions of their firm.

By far however the greatest number of TNCs that engage with multistakeholderism are those that participate in project-focused, public-private partnerships (PPP) at the national and international levels. These TNCs and related national enterprises can use the PPP form to address both state-failures to address a given social-economic-environmental need and to gain state-approval for the privatization of a given sector or region of an economy.

These shifts in role of the private sector alters long standing public-private distinctions and, as such, has implications for global and national democratic decision-making. Public–private partnerships have positioned corporations as a leading voice on decisions where public governance authorities have become dependent on private sector funding. Lobbying influences trade agreements for food systems which led to creating barriers to competition.

=== Civil society organizations / NGOs / social movements ===
One of the drivers for the creation of civil society organizations (CSOs), non-governmental organizations or social movements is to be autonomous from governments and commercial interests. With the advent of multistakeholder governance, some institutions have intentionally shifted from this autonomous position in order to further specific institutional goals; others have joined multistakeholder groups, particularly PPPs, out of an anxiety of being cut off from crucial decisions, while the majority of these organizations remain autonomous of governments and commercial interests and unconnected with multistakeholder groups.

In the first case, some CSOs have been founders of international standard setting bodies in partnership with a sector-specific TNCs and national enterprises; have joined high level multistakeholder policy groups; participated with multistakeholder groups convened to implement UN system goals (e.g. SDG goal 17); and have joined international monitoring multistakeholder initiatives.

In the second case, CSOs which have been confronted with the creation of a powerful PPP feel that non-participation would leave them at a severe local disadvantage; other CSOs would prefer that a government or the UN system would address a given topic and see no other way to set standards for that section (e.g. Global Coffee Platform).

In the third case, CSOs, NGOs, and social movements have taken positive steps to dissuade governments, TNCs, and other CSOs, NGOs and social movements to not participate in multistakeholder groups; some of these organizations have appealed to the UN Secretary General to withdraw from partnerships with multistakeholder bodies.

=== Governments, particularly policy making bodies, regulatory agencies, and infrastructure offices ===
Some governments engage with multistakeholderism to develop public policies or to avoid developing public policies. These governments, or more precisely parts of governments, have supported multistakeholder groups that address complex public policy issues, have chosen to address sensitive intergovernmental issues without the involvement of the UN system, and have chosen to address para-military issues without the involvement of the UN system (e.g. International Code of Conduct for Private Security Service Providers).

Governments are not uniform in their use of multistakeholder bodies for policy making. In several cases, some governments use multistakeholderism as a public policy mechanism. On that same public policy issue, other governments oppose the use of multitakeholderism, preferring instead to consider an issue though multilateral or bilateral arrangements. The two clearest examples are internet governance and private international standard-setting bodies which operate without developing country participation (UNCTAD's Forum on Sustainability Standards). In the case of internet governance the major private actors in this area seek to have little or no engagement with governments.

Governments all have product standard-setting regulatory institutions. Multistakeholderism presents an opportunity to have an alternative arrangement that shifts the process of formulating and monitoring standards to a multistakeholder body and shifts the standards from obligatory to voluntary. Examples of this use of multistakeholder groups by governments include opting to follow the advice of expert-based multistakeholder groups rather than establish separate expert government-based organizations, welcoming efforts to have multistakeholder standards set by TNCs and civil society to avoid conflicts with home-country TNCs and other businesses (e.g. Accord on Fire and Building Safety in Bangladesh) and supporting voluntary private standard setting for un- and under-governed spaces (e.g. oceans). Many of these cases represent an indirect privatization of public services and goods.

Other governments or parts of government actively participate in project-based public-private partnerships. In PPP, governments agree to grant dejura or de facto governance over a natural resource (i.e. access public water) or the area around an infrastructure project to a given multistakeholder group. The degree of control explicitly or implicitly transferred to the PPP and the extent that the initial expectations for operations and prices are not met has become a contentious governance issue.

=== Academy and professional associations ===
While over 250 academics assisted the WEF in developing their Global Redesign Initiative, most members of the academic community and most professional associations are not involved with multistakeholder groups. Those academics that are involved in multistakeholder groups tend to participate in policy making multistakeholder groups or the development of international product and process standard setting.

Some university-based experts join business-oriented multistakeholder bodies in a similar manner to joining the corporate boards of individual firms. However, unlike providing their expertise to a business as consultants or board member, scholars on the board of a multistakeholder governance organization, particularly ones that sets international product or process standards, have moved from an advisor and investor role to one that is functionally similar to a state regulatory official.

In some cases, university faculty are recruited by major firms or governments to create an academic-business-governmental organization to open new markets for that business or those in their sector. In other cases, multistakeholder groups and universities co-host multistakeholder events and research projects.

== See also ==
- Civil society
- Multi-stakeholder cooperatives
- Internet governance
- Internet multistakeholder governance
