= 22000 =

22000 may refer to:

- The last year in the 22nd millennium
- IE 22000 Class, a class of diesel trains in Ireland
- ISO 22000, an international food safety standard
