= Transnational corporation =

Type of enterprise

A transnational corporation is an enterprise that is involved with the international production of goods or services, foreign investments, or income and asset management in more than one country. It sets up factories in developing countries because land and labor are cheaper there.

== Characteristics ==
Transnational corporations share many qualities with multinational corporations, but there is a subtle difference. Multinational corporations consist of a centralized management structure, whereas transnational corporations generally are decentralized, with many bases in various countries where the corporation operates. While traditional multinational corporations are national companies with foreign subsidiaries, transnational corporations spread out their operations in many countries to sustain high levels of local responsiveness.

A transnational corporation operates substantial facilities, does business in more than one country, and does not consider any particular country its corporate home. One of the significant advantages of a transnational company is that it is able to maintain a greater degree of responsiveness to the local markets where it maintains facilities.

Transnationality also refers to the extent to which a firm engages in value-creating activities across national borders. Faced with accelerated globalization, managers often make decisions to expand a firm's transnationality in order to enable the firm to effectively compete with rivals on a global scale (e.g. Nestlé, Deutsche Post, Toyota, etc.), who employ senior executives from many countries and tries to make decisions from a global perspective rather than from one centralized headquarters. Actions taken with transnational cooperation can help create better relationships between nations. Resources that are found in nations often need to be spread out throughout the world and thus transnationality helps this process.

The history of transnational corporations dates back to Western Europe in the 16th century. During this time firms like the British East India Company were founded.

Transnational corporations (TNCs) have significantly influenced the global business landscape, distinguishing themselves from traditional multinational corporations with their decentralized management structures. This article explores the characteristics, advantages, and historical roots of TNCs, providing a comprehensive understanding of their impact on the global economy.

TNCs, characterized by a decentralized structure, stand out for their ability to adapt to diverse business environments. In contrast to multinational corporations, TNCs operate with multiple bases across countries, fostering local responsiveness and flexibility.

== Global Value-Creation and Competitiveness ==
The transnationality of corporations plays a crucial role in creating global value. Firms like Nike, Deutsche Post, and Toyota exemplify this approach by expanding transnational activities to remain competitive on a global scale. Decision-making processes prioritize a global perspective, with diverse executive teams driving innovation and adaptability.

== Enhancing International Relationships ==
TNCs contribute to better international relationships by spreading resources globally. This cooperative approach fosters the interconnectedness of economies, benefiting both corporations and the development of diplomatic ties between nations.

== Historical Roots ==
The historical roots of TNCs trace back to Western Europe in the 16th century. Companies like the British East India Company laid the foundation for the transnational model by establishing operations in multiple countries. This historical context underscores the enduring nature of TNCs and their pivotal role in shaping the global business landscape.

== See also ==
- Randolph Bourne
