= ISO 22000 =

Food safety Management System Standard

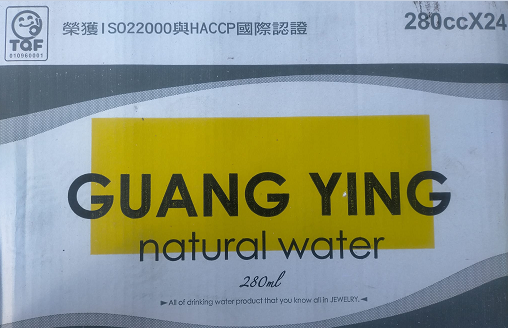
Awarded ISO 22000 and Hazard analysis and critical control points's Guang Ying natural water.

ISO 22000 is a food safety management system by the International Organization for Standardization (ISO) which is outcome focused, providing requirements for any organization in the food industry with objective to help to improve overall performance in food safety. These standards are intended to ensure safety in the global food supply chain. The standards involve the overall guidelines for food safety management and also focuses on traceability in the feed and food chain.

== Food safety ==
Food safety refers to all those hazards, whether chronic or acute, that may make food injurious to the health of the consumer.

== ISO 22000 standard ==
ISO 22000 is the most popular voluntary food safety international standard in the food industry with 51,535 total number of sites (as per the ISO Survey 2022). The ISO 22000 family are international voluntary consensus standards which align to Good Standardization Practices (GSP) and the World Trade Organization (WTO) Principles for the Development of International Standards. Defining the requirements for a Food Safety Management System (FSMS) and incorporating the following elements which as defined as FSMS principles:

- system management
- prerequisite programs
- HACCP principles

Critical reviews of the above elements have been conducted by many scientists. Communication along the food chain is essential to ensure that all relevant food safety hazards are identified and adequately controlled at each step within the food chain. This implies communication between organizations both upstream and downstream in the food chain. Communication with customers and suppliers about identified hazards and control measures will assist in clarifying customer and supplier requirements.

Recognition of the organization's role and position within the food chain is essential to ensure effective interactive communication throughout the chain in order to deliver safe food products to the consumer.

== ISO 22000 and HACCP ==
ISO 22000 has two Plan-Do-Check-Act (PDCA) cycles which operate one inside the other, the first covering the management system, the second the operations (described in ISO 22000:2018, Clause 8), which simultaneously cover the HACCP principles. ISO 22000 references the Codex Alimentarius General Principles of Food Hygiene, CXC 1-1969 which includes HACCP principles and 12 HACCP application steps. The following table explains the relationship and alignment between ISO 22000 and the Codex Alimentarius General Principles of Food Hygiene, CXC 1-1969. The task, Validate the control measure(s) or combination(s) of control measures, also references Guidelines for the Validation of Food Safety Control Measures, CXG 69-2008

ISO 22000 and HACCP
Task	ISO 22000:2018	General Principles of Food Hygiene, CXC 1-1969
Establish the food safety team	Subclauses 5.3.1 c) and 5.3.2, and links to Subclauses 7.1.2 (people) and 7.2 (competence)	HACCP step 1
Provide the information needed to conduct the hazard analysis	Subclause 8.5.1 (from Subclauses 8.5.1.2 to 8.5.1.4)	HACCP steps 2 and 3
Prepare the process flow diagram	Subclause 8.5.1.5	HACCP step 6 and principle 1
Identify the hazards associated with the food	Subclauses 8.5.2.1 and 8.5.2.2	HACCP step 6 and principle 1
Conduct a hazard assessment	Subclause 8.5.2.3	HACCP step 6 and principle 1
List and select control measure(s) or combination(s) of control measures	Subclause 8.5.2.4	HACCP step 6 and principle 1
Categorize, manage, monitor and document the control measures	Subclauses 8.5.2.4 and 8.5.4 (from 8.5.4.1 to 8.5.4.3)	HACCP principles 2 and 3, HACCP steps 6, 7, 8, 9 and 12)
Validate the control measure(s) or combination(s) of control measures	Subclause 8.5.3	HACCP step 7 and principle 2, step 6 and principle 3, step 11 and principle 6
Establish and apply corrections and corrective actions	Subclauses 8.5.4.1, 8.5.4.4 and 8.9	HACCP principle 5, HACCP steps 10 and 11
Control monitoring and measuring (operational processes)	Subclause 8.7	
Conduct a verification related to the PRPs and hazard control plan	Subclause 8.8	
Update the preliminary information	Subclause 8.6	HACCP steps 5 and 7

A study explains the importance of ISO 22000 Food Safety Management System (FSMS), Critical Control Points Hazard Analysis (HACCP) and the Prerequisite Programs (PRPs) as the foundation of HACCP, in preventing foodborne outbreaks. In addition, another study for HACCP effectiveness between ISO 22000 certified and non-certified dairy companies identified that by implementing the HACCP Food Safety System (FSS) and by being ISO 22000 certified, the level of the achievement of the HACCP objectives is improved significantly.

== ISO 22000 family of standards ==
ISO published additional standards that are related to ISO 22000. These standards are known as the ISO 22000 family of standards. At the present time, the following standards will make up the ISO 22000 family of standards:

- ISO 22000 – Food safety management systems – Requirements for any organization in the food chain.
- ISO 22001 – Guidelines on the application of ISO 9001:2000 for the food and drink industry (replaces: ISO 15161:2001 Withdrawn).
- ISO/TS 22002- Prerequisite programmes on food safety—Part 1: Food manufacturing; Part 2: Catering; Part 3: Farming; Part 4: Food packaging manufacturing; Part 5: Transport and storage; Part 6: Feed and animal food production
- ISO/TS 22003 – Food safety — Part 1: Requirements for bodies providing audit and certification of food safety management systems; Part 2: Requirements for bodies providing evaluation and certification of products, processes and services, including an audit of the food safety system
- ISO/TS 22004 – Food safety management systems – Guidance on the application of ISO 22000:2005.
- ISO 22005 – Traceability in the feed and food chain – General principles and basic requirements for system design and implementation.
- ISO 22006 – Quality management systems – Guidance on the application of ISO 9002:2000 for crop production.

ISO 22000 is also used as a basis for the Food Safety Systems Certification (FSSC) Scheme FSSC 22000. FSSC 22000 is a Global Food Safety Initiative (GFSI) approved scheme, also referred to as a certification programme owner (CPO). The differences between ISO 22000 and schemes with GFSI recognition are explained in a paper from ISO, International standards and private standards.

== ISO 9001 vs ISO 22000 ==
In the early 1990s, the application of ISO 9000:1987 series of standards were embraced by the food industry in the European Union (EU). At the same time, the USDA recognized HACCP systems to demonstrate food safety in the US. This led to these two systems being combined, where ISO 9001 was certified along with HACCP as a single management tool in organizations. In Europe, ISO 9001 and HACCP were used by companies as a "due diligence" defense against prosecution under the 1990 Food Safety Act. With ISO 9001 and HACCP established and accepted, the food industry was working towards standardization and a single international standard, eventually, ISO 22000. This path was diverted when the British Retail Consortium published the BRC Food Technical Standard, in 1998. The BRC decision to publish as a stand-alone standard, instead of publishing as an addendum and adding food safety requirements to support ISO 9001, led to the Global Food Safety Initiative creating a benchmarking model for harmonization of private standards. Harmonization was considered as an alternative to promoting standardization with an international standard. Food retailers, as members of the Consumer Goods Forum, changed their 'due diligence' defence from ISO 9001 and HACCP, to BRC and other private standards recognized by the Global Food Safety Initiative, despite any evidence whether private standards are beneficial or detrimental for global food supply chains.

ISO 22000 is an industrial-specific risk management system for any type of food safety which includes farming, processing, manufacturing, catering, storage and distribution. ISO 22000 is designed using the ISO high level structure (HLS), also referred to as Annex SL, to be integrated with other ISO Management System Standards (MSS) including the Quality Management System of ISO 9001. For conformity assessment and auditing, both ISO 9001 and ISO 22000 refer to ISO 17021 Conformity assessment, Requirements for bodies providing audit and certification of management systems and ISO 19011 Guidelines for auditing management systems. The detailed similarities, differences and combined effects of the two standards (ISO 9001, ISO 22000) can be found elsewhere.^{,}^{,}^{,}.^{,}

== Potential justification ==
ISO Management System Standards (MSS) are designed to be integrated for any sector or industry and size, this is further explained in ISO and Small & Medium Enterprises. In 2004, the European Office of Crafts, Trades and Small and Medium sized Enterprises for Standardisation noted that the standard is only suitable for large sized companies and small food businesses will not be able to seek such a high standard due to the lack of resources to pursue the certification. The agency suggested creating an alternative for small food businesses to achieve the same objective. EFSA is now making their efforts on the food legislations that are adaptable for the SMEs in food supply chains. In addition, ISO and United Nations Industrial Development Organization (UNIDO) jointly published ISO 22000 a practical guide which provides guidance to assist all organizations (including small and medium-sized) that recognize the potential benefits of implementing a FSMS in accordance with ISO 22000.

Food organizations which seek the standard certification are evolving towards integrated management systems, typically integrating Environmental (ISO 14001) and Occupational Health & Safety (ISO 45001) along with Quality (ISO 9001). This takes a process approach and risk-based thinking into consideration where risks are addressed at both organizational and operational levels which include food safety, worker safety and environmental and are from the primary production in the supply chains and the later stages of food processing.^{,}

== Evolution of ISO 22000 ==
The ISO 22000 standard is managed and revised by ISO/TC 34/SC 17 with subject matter feedback from experts proposed by national standards bodies.

Year	Edition of ISO 22000
2005	1st Edition
2018	2nd Edition

=== 2005 version ===
ISO 22000 was first published in 2005 as the first international standard for Food Safety Management Systems (FSMS), harmonizing global food safety practices. It integrated Hazard Analysis and Critical Control Points (HACCP) principles with prerequisite programs (PRPs) to create a unified framework for food safety. The initial release established core requirements for FSMS, emphasizing risk management, supply chain communication, and continuous improvement. Initially this version was a more procedural-orientated than a principle based management system.

=== 2018 version ===
A major revision aligned ISO 22000 with Annex SL, the high-level structure for ISO management system standards. Key changes included:

- Stronger emphasis on risk-based thinking (beyond HACCP).
- Clarification of PRPs vs. operational controls.
- Enhanced leadership and compliance requirements.

The 2018 revision addressed procedural-orientated rather than a principle-based by including the ISO general management principles, in addition to the FSMS principles, which are also referred to as the Quality Management Principles.

=== Future versions and growth ===
In 2024, the standard was under review for potential updates, including blockchain traceability and AI-driven hazard analysis. ISO 22000 is well positioned for growth due to the ISO 2030 Strategy around inclusiveness and the World Health Organization food safety strategy which explains governments should use international standards and guidelines to the greatest extent. This is supported by the World Trade Organization and Food and Agriculture Organization joint publication which explains the WTO Agreements strongly encourage governments to harmonize their requirements on the basis of international standards.

== Regulatory Impact ==
The European Union and U.S. FDA recognize ISO 22000 as a voluntary compliance tool for food safety regulations e.g., EU Regulation 852/2004 and FSMA Final Rule for Preventive Controls for Human Food. Developing economies e.g., India, Brazil increasingly adopt ISO 22000 to access global markets. For public sector organisations, there are case studies and research papers explaining the benefits of using accredited conformity assessment for ISO 22000. The Codex Alimentarius Committee on Methods of Analysis and Sampling endorses analytical and test methods from various standards writing bodies, including ISO, following recommendations from the relevant Codex Commodity Committee.

== See also ==
- Annex SL
- Codex Alimentarius
- Foodborne illness
- Food engineering
- Food packaging
- Food safety
- Food system
- Global Food Safety Initiative
- Harmonization (standards)
- International Organization for Standardization
- International Standard
- ISO 9000
- List of ISO standards
- Management system
- PDCA
- Process manufacturing
- Standardization
- Technical standard
