= Global Food Safety Initiative =

Private organization

The Global Food Safety Initiative (GFSI) is a private organization that works as a "coalition of action" from the Consumer Goods Forum (CGF) and brings together retailers and brand owners (manufacturers) from across the CGF membership. The GFSI operates under multi-stakeholder governance, with the objective to create "an extended food safety community to oversee food safety standards for businesses and help provide access to safe food for people everywhere". GFSI's work in benchmarking and harmonization aims to foster mutual acceptance of GFSI-recognized certification programs across the industry, with the ambition to enable a "once certified, accepted everywhere" approach.

== About ==
The Global Food Safety Initiative (GFSI) is a business-driven initiative for the continuous improvement of food safety management systems, with the ambition to ensure confidence in the delivery of safe food to consumers worldwide. GFSI provides a platform for collaboration between some of the world's leading food safety experts from retailer, manufacturer, food service companies, service providers associated with the food supply chain, international organizations, academia, and government.

The initiative was launched in 2000 following a number of food safety crises and pending changes to public laws in the food sector, including EU food law. With legal obligations for their supply chains, and compliance connected to liability, European retailers decided to use technical standards to comply with public law requirements.

Since then, experts from all over the world have been collaborating in numerous technical working groups to tackle current food safety issues defined by GFSI stakeholders. Key activities within GFSI include the definition and control of minimum requirements for food safety certification programs and a robust benchmarking process. GFSI benchmarking and recognition of existing technical standards are used for food safety certification programs, with the objective to enhance confidence, acceptance, and implementation of third-party certification along the entire food supply chain.

Other important activities include the development of a capacity-building program for small and/or less developed businesses to facilitate their access to local markets, and a continuous focus on food safety auditor competence to bring industry experts in collaboration with key stakeholders to a common consensus on the skills, knowledge, and attributes that a competent auditor should possess.

In 2020, GFSI launched a program named The Race to the Top (RTTT), with the objective to address specific challenges in relation to lack of trust and confidence in GFSI-recognized certification. This included food safety recalls for food manufacturers with GFSI-recognized certificates in the supply chains of their Consumer Goods Forum members. In 2022, IFS reported they had requested the legality of the RTTT to be reviewed by the Federal Cartel Office under antitrust and competition law.

== Benchmarking ==
Within GFSI, benchmarking is a procedure by which a food safety-related certification programme is compared to GFSI benchmarking requirements.

In 2000, food safety was a top-of-mind issue for companies due to several high-profile recalls, quarantines, and negative publicity about the food industry. There was also extensive audit fatigue throughout the industry, as retailers performed inspections or audits themselves or asked a third party to do this on their behalf. These were often carried out against food safety schemes that lacked international certification and accreditation, resulting in incompatible auditing results.

CEOs of global companies came together at the Consumer Goods Forum, knowing that under new pending EU food law, "unsatisfactory inspection results should lead to appropriate action". If they could demonstrate that technical standards avoid non-compliance to food law, enforcement authorities would be less likely to prosecute their companies in the event of food safety incidents within supply chains. The CEOs agreed that consumer trust needed to be strengthened and maintained through a safer supply chain.

GFSI was created to achieve this through the harmonization of food safety standards that would help mitigate liability exposure for retailers and reduce audit duplication throughout the supply chain. At the time, there was no existing scheme that could be adopted by all. GFSI therefore chose to implement benchmarking, developing a model that determines equivalency between existing food safety schemes, whilst leaving flexibility and choice in the marketplace.

Benchmarking allows multiple certification programmes with GFSI recognition to enter the marketplace. This created strong competition among certification programme owners (CPO) who employ large marketing teams with annual growth targets. GFSI benchmarking implies equivalency, though the financial opportunities with certification programme fees resulted in a perverse incentive, with CPOs working to differentiate themselves from their competitors. The unintended consequence of harmonization was fragmentation due to additional CPO entrants requesting recognition for monetary gain. Companies that have to choose a certification program often hire consultants to help them decide on the best scheme, which causes confusion for stakeholders. Concerns around poor benchmarking practices in the food sector led to UNIDO publishing a framework to guide and govern benchmarking. This included a recommendation for benchmarking organizations not to recognize schemes if an international standard (ISO, IEC, ITU) already exists, is established, and is adopted by regulatory authorities.

GFSI is not a CPO and does not undertake any certification or accreditation activities. However, it is structured and designed to control the minimum requirements in schemes and therefore influence certification activities. GFSI represents its Consumer Goods Forum members, and their steering committee governance have controlling interest to decide benchmarking requirements.

GFSI objectives:

- Reduce food safety risks by delivering equivalence and convergence between effective food safety management systems
- Manage cost in the global food system by eliminating redundancy and improving operational efficiency
- Develop competencies and capacity-building in food safety to create consistent and effective global food systems
- Provide a unique international stakeholder platform for collaboration, knowledge exchange, and networking

== Recognition ==
GFSI has recognized a number of food safety management programs that fulfill the criteria of the GFSI benchmarking requirements. These are regularly revised by GFSI to reflect improvements in best practices. GFSI is not a CPO in itself and does not carry out any accreditation or certification activities.

The status of recognition is achieved through a comprehensive benchmarking process. Once a standard has gained formal recognition by the GFSI steering committee, this standard is deemed to meet all of the requirements in the GFSI benchmarking requirements.

Certification according to a GFSI-recognized certification programme can be achieved through a successful third-party audit against any of the following certification programs, recognized by GFSI:

- BRCGS Global Standard for Food Safety
- BRCGS Global Standard for Packaging and Packaging Materials
- BRCGS Global Standard for Agents and Brokers
- BRCGS Global Standard for Storage and Distribution
- CanadaGAP (Canadian Horticultural Council On-Farm Food Safety Program)
- Freshcare FSQ
- FSSC 22000 (based on requirements defined in ISO 22000)
- Global Aquaculture Alliance Seafood – Seafood Processing Standard
- Global Red Meat Standard
- GLOBALG.A.P. Integrated farm assurance Scheme
- GLOBALG.A.P. Harmonized Produce Safety Standard
- GLOBALG.A.P. Produce Handling Assurance Standard
- Global Retailer & Manufacturer Alliance (GRMA)
- Global Seafood Alliance
- International Featured Standards IFS Food
- International Featured Standards IFS Logistics
- International Featured Standards IFS Broker
- International Featured Standards IFS PACsecure
- Japan Food Safety Management Association JFS-C
- Japan GAP Foundation ASIAGAP
- PrimusGFS Standard
- SQF Safe Quality Food Code

Up-to-date information on the status of CPO benchmarking and recognition is published on the GFSI website. Some CPOs are registered as nonprofit organizations and others as for-profit.

== Conformity assessment ==
The third-party audit of certification programs with GFSI recognition is performed by accredited certification bodies. GFSI allows certification programs to choose which conformity assessment requirements certification bodies must follow. The two options are:

- ISO/IEC 17021 conformity assessment — requirements for bodies providing audit and certification of management systems
- ISO/IEC 17065 conformity assessment — requirements for bodies certifying products, processes, and services

Certification programmes following ISO/IEC 17021 must also meet the requirements of ISO 22003-1 certification of food safety management systems; ISO 22003-2 certification of food safety systems is supplemental to ISO/IEC 17065.

ISO 17021 and ISO 17065 follow ISO/IEC 17000 for vocabulary and general principles, which defines the terms "conformity assessment scheme" and "scheme". This term is referenced by regulators. In 2018, GFSI introduced a new term, Certification Program Owner, to refer to scheme owners. Additionally, GFSI raised an objection to the term "scheme" in the Codex Committee Electronic Working Group for Codex Draft Principles and Guidelines for the assessment and use of voluntary third-party assurance programs. This resulted in a new term, "vTPA", being introduced.

A comparative study of schemes explains an ISO 17065 scheme as product certification, which is prescriptive, and an ISO 17021 scheme as a management certification, and non-prescriptive. A paper from the Food and Agriculture Organization, with a review of literature (Wolff and Scannell, 2008; FAO, 2009a; IIED, 2009; WTO, 2010), highlighted concerns that included private food safety standards being prescriptive rather than outcome-focused.

== Industry influence and motivation ==
Under the umbrella of GFSI, eight major retailers (Carrefour, Tesco, ICA, Metro, Migros, Ahold, Wal-Mart, and Delhaize) operate as a private sector-led Multi-Stakeholder Initiative (MSI), also referred to as mult-istakeholder governance. Major retailers came to a common acceptance of the GFSI benchmarked food safety certification programs in June 2007.

The motivation for retailer- and brand-owner influence over benchmarking requirements for CPOs is focused on their legal liability, mostly related to food safety failures within supply chains. Under EU food law, retailers and brand owners have a legal responsibility for their brands, and the main reason GFSI was founded at the time was to comply with the legal obligation to check suppliers. This legal obligation stimulated a parallel development of private standards as self-regulation tools, adding to the global food sector's burden, as the requirements were focused on liability mitigation against EU food law. Retailers were cautious to avoid potential scandals, which resulted in taking the lead on technical committees and with governance over standard-setting organizations such as IFS and BRCGS.

Concerns around self-regulation and corporate governance in the absence of government regulation have been raised by the Institute for Multi-Stakeholder Initiative Integrity, with conclusions that private-sector MSIs adopt weak or narrow standards that better serve corporate interests than rightsholder interests.

== Divided opinion within GFSI ==
Brand owners, who are more focused on manufacturing food, and retailers, who are more focused on selling food, have divided opinions on schemes with GFSI recognition. The majority of brand owners who are GFSI members implement FSSC 22000 in their manufacturing facilities. This includes Barilla, Cargill, Coca-Cola, Danone, Kraft Heinz, Mondelez, PepsiCo, and Nestle. FSSC 22000 is based on an international standard (ISO 22000) and follows ISO 17021.

Brand owners choose FSSC 22000 for two reasons: Firstly, food manufacturing is a process industry, and ISO 17021 is a process-based approach to food safety, which complements process manufacturing. Secondly, some brand owners have implemented ISO-integrated management systems in their manufacturing facilities, which are designed for integration with ISO 9001 Quality, ISO 14001 Environmental, and ISO 45001 Occupational Health & Safety standards.

In 2007, the United Nations Conference on Trade and Development and the World Trade Organization jointly organized an informal information session on private standards. A proposal was made to GFSI to adopt ISO 22000 as a single international standard for the reasons of impartiality, independence, consensus, and no scheme-owner fees. There was strong opposition from scheme owners, as their schemes would likely become obsolete if an international standard was adopted.

Retailers rejected the proposal due to their close relationships with scheme owners using private standards. The proposal was raised again in 2020, and GFSI restated their position not to have one standard for the food industry. Promoting ISO 22000 for food and farming would mean reducing the power of global retailers in terms of control over standards.

== GFSI conference ==
GFSI hosts an annual conference in different regions, including Europe, North America, and Asia.

| Year | City | Country | Region |
|---|---|---|---|
| 2001 | Geneva | Switzerland | Europe |
| 2002 | Geneva | Switzerland | Europe |
| 2004 | Barcelona | Spain | Europe |
| 2005 | Rome | Italy | Europe |
| 2006 | Paris | France | Europe |
| 2007 | Munich | Germany | Europe |
| 2008 | Amsterdam | The Netherlands | Europe |
| 2009 | Barcelona | Spain | Europe |
| 2010 | Washington D.C. | USA | North America |
| 2011 | London | UK | Europe |
| 2012 | Orlando | USA | North America |
| 2013 | Barcelona | Spain | Europe |
| 2014 | Anaheim | USA | North America |
| 2015 | Kuala Lumpur | Malaysia | Asia |
| 2016 | Berlin | Germany | Europe |
| 2017 | Houston | USA | North America |
| 2018 | Tokyo | Japan | Asia |
| 2019 | Nice | France | Europe |
| 2020 | Seattle | USA | North America |
| 2022 | Barcelona | Spain | Europe |
| 2023 | Atlanta | USA | North America |
| 2024 | Singapore | Singapore | Asia |
| 2025 | Dublin | Ireland | Europe |
| 2026 | Vancouver | Canada | North America |
