= Consumer Goods Forum =

The Consumer Goods Forum (CGF) is an industry network focused on positive change and greater efficiency within the consumer goods industry. Its members include retailers, manufacturers, and other stakeholders from 70 countries in the consumer goods industry. The CGF authored the Global Food Safety Initiative (GFSI).

== History ==
The CGF was formed in June 2009. In 2025, it released a Common Data Framework with Boston Consulting Group (BCG) to standardize data collection on emissions and deforestation in the industry.

== Description ==
Membership is open to consumer goods manufacturers and retailers, with a broad representation from different company sizes and geographic locations. CGF is governed by a board of directors and operates through various committees and working groups (sustainability, health and wellness, supply chain practices).

As a part of CGF, Global Food Safety Initiative (GFSI) works to ensure safe food for consumers everywhere. It sets global food safety standards and promotes continuous improvement in food safety management systems to ensure confidence in the delivery of safe food to consumers worldwide.

== Global events and conferences ==
- The Global Summit: The CGF annual summit gathers global leaders from the consumer goods industry to discuss key challenges and share insights. It's a platform for networking, collaboration, and setting the agenda for future initiatives.
- The GFSI Conference: The annual rendezvous for everyone involved in advancing food safety and consumer trust worldwide.
- The Sustainable Retail Summit: Learn first‐hand how companies are taking positive actions to drive change and overcome today’s biggest sustainability and health challenges.
- The Future Leaders Programme: An all-new format to help define our industry's next generation of leaders
- E2E Springboards: Making technology interesting and tangible in a safe “dem” environment
- WinterComes: Global leaders and experts meet to advance the state of supply chains
