= Sustainable products =

Environmentally-beneficial products

Sustainable products are products either sustainably sourced, manufactured or processed and provide environmental, social, and economic benefits while protecting public health and the environment throughout their whole life cycle, from the extraction of raw materials to the final disposal.

== Scope of definition ==
According to Belz, Frank-Martin, the definition of sustainable product has six characteristics:

- Customer satisfaction: any products or services that do not meet customer needs will not survive in the market in the long term.
- Dual focus: Unlike purely environmental products, sustainable products focus on ecological and social significance.
- Life-cycle orientation: Sustainable products are environmentally friendly throughout their life. That is, from the moment the raw materials are extracted to the moment the final product is disposed of, there must be no permanent environmental damage.
- Significant improvements: Sustainable products contribute to solving socio-ecological problems globally or provide measurable improvements in socio-ecological product performance.
- Continuous improvement: as the state of knowledge, technologies, and societal expectations continually develop, sustainable products should also continuously improve social and environmental variation.
- Competing offers: sustainable products may still lag behind competing offers, therefore, the competing offers may serve as a benchmark regarding social and ecological performance.

Michael Braungart and William McDonough's book Cradle to Cradle: Remaking the Way We Make Things expands on the life-cycle part of this definition. They suggest that every material and product should be made in a manner that when its useful life is over, all the materials of which it is made can be returned to the Earth after composting, or endlessly recycled as raw materials.

=== Product information ===
Product information can enable, facilitate, require or support consumers or other buyers and importers to identify sustainable products or sustainability of products. Sustainability standards and certifications are used for this purpose:

==== Sustainable product standards ====
Sustainability standards, also known as Voluntary Sustainability Standards (VSS), are private standards that require products to meet specific economic, social, or environmental sustainability metrics. The requirements include product quality or attributes, production and processing methods, and transportation. VSS are mostly designed and marketed by non-governmental organizations (NGOs) or private firms, and they are adopted by actors up and down the value chain, from farmers to retailers. Certifications and labels signal the successful implementation of a VSS. Over the last decades, these standards have emerged as new tools to address key sustainability challenges such as biodiversity, climate change, and human rights. The standards cover a wide range of sectors, such as agriculture, fishery, forestry, energy, textile, and others. According to the ITC standards map, agricultural products are the most commonly covered products, followed by consumer products.

==== Overall standards ====
===== Nordic Swan Ecolabel =====
The Nordic Swan Ecolabel standard, which is distributed in Norway, Sweden, Denmark, Finland, and Iceland, mainly refers to distinguished products that have a positive effect on the environment. It likely has climate requirements that limit the amount of CO_{2} emissions where it is most relevant. More than 3,000 products, predominantly household chemicals, paper products, office machinery, and building materials, have been issued with this label. The criteria account for environmental factors through the product's life cycle (raw material extraction, production and distribution, use and refuse). Thus the most important parameters are consumption of natural resources and energy, emissions into air, water and soil, generation of waste and noise.

===== Global Reporting Initiative (GRI) =====
GRI frames and disseminates global sustainability reporting guidelines for 'voluntary use by organizations reporting on the economic, environmental, and social dimensions of their activities, products, and services.' According to GRI Guidelines, reporting bodies should consider stakeholders' interests and use social indicators and others that more accurately depict the organization's social and ecological performance.

===== Life Cycle Assessment =====
Life-cycle assessment (LCA) evaluates and discloses the environmental benefits of products over their complete life cycle, from raw materials extraction to final disposition. The International Organization for Standardization (ISO) has standardized the process of conducting LCA studies since 1997.

==== Product-oriented standards ====
===== Organic Food Labeling =====
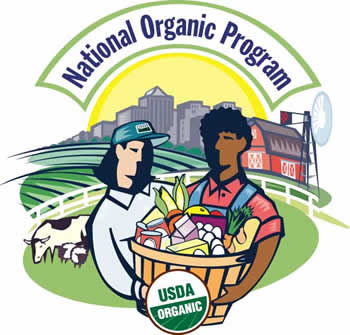
The National Organic Program (run by the USDA) is responsible for the legal definition of organic in the United States and issue organic certification.

Organic food are foods that are produced using methods involving no agricultural synthetic inputs, for instance, synthetic pesticides, chemical fertilizers, genetically modified organisms (GMO), and are not processed using irradiation, industrial solvents, or chemical food additives. Currently, the United States, European Union, Canada, Japan and many other industrialized countries require food producers to acquire special criteria or certification to market their products as "organic". Apparently, organic food producers emphasize sustainable conservation of the social-ecological attributes such as soil, water and the whole ecosystem. International organizations such as the Organic Consumers Association supervise the development of organic food. According to the National Organic Program (NOP) in the US, a voluntary green-and-white seal on foods' packaging denotes that a product is at least 95% organic.

===== MSC Labeling =====
The Marine Stewardship Council (MSC) is an independent non-profit organization established in 1997 to address the overfishing problem. Fisheries that are assessed and meet the standard can use the MSC blue ecolabel. The MSC mission is to 'reward sustainable fishing practices'. As of the end of 2010, more than 1,300 fisheries and companies had achieved a Marine Stewardship Council certification.

===== FSC Labeling =====
The Forest Stewardship Council (FSC) is an international non-profit organization established in 1993 to 'promote forest management that is environmentally appropriate, socially beneficial and economically viable'. Its main responsibilities for achieving the goal are standard framing, independent certification issuing and labeling. FSC directly or indirectly addresses issues such as illegal logging, deforestation and global warming and has positive effects on economic development, environmental conservation, poverty alleviation and social and political empowerment.

===== Fair Trade Labeling =====
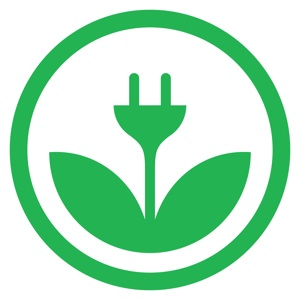
EKOenergy is an ecolabel for energy in Europe.

Although there is no universally accepted definition of fair trade, Fairtrade Labeling Organizations International (FLO) most commonly refer to a definition developed by FINE, an informal association of four international fair trade networks (Fair trade Labeling Organizations International, World Fair Trade Organization - formerly International Fair Trade Association, Network of European Worldshops and European Fair Trade Association): fair trade is a trading partnership, based on dialogue, transparency and respect, that seeks greater equity in international trade. It contributes to sustainable development by offering better trading conditions to, and securing the rights of, marginalized producers and workers – especially in the South. Fair trade organizations, backed by consumers, are engaged actively in supporting producers, awareness raising and in campaigning for changes in the rules and practice of conventional international trade.

===== U. S. Green Building Council LEED Rating System =====
The LEED Green Building Rating System evaluates environmental performance of all buildings over their life, providing the definitive standard for what constitutes a "green" building, persuading the consumer and building industry to develop products that are more environmentally and economically viable.

===== EKOenergy label =====
EKOenergy is an ecolabel originating in Finland. It is becoming the continent-wide ecolabel for energy, which is supported by number European NGOs. It evaluates sustainability of electricity products on open energy markets.

===== Green Seal =====
Green Seal is a North American non-profit ecolabel organization established in 1989. It generates life cycle-based sustainability standards for products, services and companies in addition to offering third party independent test organization certification for those meeting its standards. Green Seal was the first non-profit environmental certification program established in the United States. It currently has certified nearly 4,000 products and services within 400 categories.

== Sustainable product policies ==
There was widespread support for reducing the price of sustainable products by respondents to the 2020-21 European Investment Bank Climate Survey.

=== International ===
Since 1998, the branch of the United Nations Environment Programme (UNEP) has undertaken several national programs or action plans on sustainable consumption and production. Moreover, the United Nations is responsible for administering the Marrakech Process and developing the ten-year Sustainable Consumption and Production Framework through Regional Marrakech Process Consultations, whose goal is to accelerate the shift towards sustainable consumption and production (SCP).

Organisation for Economic Co-operation and Development (OECD)'s Environmental Directorate has also done comprehensive work on the environmental impacts of sustainable consumption and production. One of current OECD projects is reviewing measures for sustainable manufacturing production.

In 2015, the United Nations established 17 Sustainable Development Goals (SDG) and SDG 12 refers to "responsible consumption and production." Specifically, Target 12.1 has a single indicator to "Implement the 10‑Year Framework of Programmes on Sustainable Consumption and Production Patterns, all countries taking action, with developed countries taking the lead, taking into account the development and capabilities of developing countries".

=== Regions and countries ===
On 16 July 2008 the European Commission presented the Sustainable Consumption and Production and Sustainable Industrial Policy (SCP/SIP) Action Plan which clarifies the United Nations' Marrakech Process on Sustainable Consumption and Production and global ten-year Sustainable Consumption and Production Framework and was adopted by the council on 4 December 2008 and is updated regularly. It includes a series of proposals on sustainable consumption and production to target EU goals for environmental sustainability, economic growth and public welfare, which are as follows:

- A proposal to extend mandatory labeling requirements which is relevant to the energy efficiency of products according to the 1992 Energy Labeling Directive.
- A proposal to widen the covering fields of voluntary EU Ecolabel of products (e.g., including food and beverage products) and streamline the system.

Sample EU energy efficiency label.

- A proposal for an independent communication on green public procurement. This communication identifies economic priority sectors, establishes common environmental criteria and guides to implement green public procurement by Member States.
- A proposal for the revision of the EU Eco-Management and Audit Scheme (EMAS) to enlarge the number of companies involved, including companies outside the EU, and decrease the administrative costs for Small and Mediums Sized Enterprises (SMEs).
- Proposals on sustainable consumption and production that will contribute to improve the environmental efficiency of products and increase the demand for more pro-environmental goods and production technologies.

In 2020–2021, the EU discussed the possible implementation of the Sustainable Product Policy Initiative, which may include, amongst others, the inclusion of a Digital Product Passport. The EU sustainable product policy was renewed in function of the European Green Deal and the new Circular Economy Action Plan and revises the Ecodesign Directive.

The United States government does not have a standardized national policy or strategy for sustainable consumption and production. However, the U.S. Environmental Protection Agency (EPA) develops extensive sustainability programs on water, agriculture, energy, and ecosystem, etc. At the same time, the U.S. Department of State's Sustainable Development Partnerships web page provides considerable information about the U.S. government's sustainable development initiatives to help other countries set up and implement their own development strategies in social and ecological terms.

The United Kingdom government considers Sustainable Consumption and Production is one of the four priority sectors identified in the 2005 UK Sustainable Development Strategy. The UK government is carrying out a series of actions to achieve goals of sustainable consumption and production in public and private areas respectively.

The Norwegian Ministry of the Environment founded Norway's Green in Practice (GRIP), which is a public-private foundation established in 1996 to promote sustainable consumption and production. At the same time, Norway's Ministry of Finance has primary responsibility to fund the strategy of sustainable development.

The Australian government requires that certain electrical products for sale should contain mandatory energy-efficiency labeling to provide consumers with information that helps reduce energy use and green house gas emissions.

== Sustainable product design ==
Conventionally, environmental management systems have always addressed the impacts of products on local surroundings. ISO 14001 (ISO 14001:3) provides a formalized framework for managing significant environmental aspects and improving environmental performance through a Plan, Do, Check, Review continual improvement cycle.

During the phase of product planning, consumer demands and market opportunities are evaluated. At this time a product description and execution plans for a successful program launch are developed and product requirements are defined.

During the phase of product development, specific design specifications are finalized, models are built, and designs are reviewed and released for manufacture planning. Once manufacturing begins, the product is commercially launched for general availability and volume deployed to the marketplace. Once a prototype is available, LCA is used as a fundamental standard to identify significant social and environmental aspects and quantify environmental impact.

Once a product is launched into market and becomes commercialized, it enters the maturity phase, which means that the sales and the profits both reach the peak. The maturity phase contains two stages: during the first stage of maturity, the customer is utilizing the product. Modifications may still be made to the product to enhance or change it. The product enters the second stage of maturity when it approaches near to the decline phase.

Where applicable, end-of-life products are taken back and subsequently reused or recycled efficiently. While being a legal requirement in the EU, the take back of end-of-life products offers the chance to review the final life cycle stage of a product through direct contact with recyclers. This knowledge can then be applied to future designs and product improvement. Recent research highlights the growing role of digital technologies such as blockchain and artificial intelligence in improving product traceability and promoting circular economy principles in sustainable product design.

== Scientific analysis to assess sustainability and alternatives of products ==
A 2021 study reviewed 217 analyses of on-the-market products and services, analyzed existing alternatives to mainstream food, holidays, and furnishings, and concludes that total greenhouse gas emissions by Swedes could be lowered by to date up to 36–38% if consumers – without a decrease in total estimated expenditure or considerations of self-interest rationale – instead were to obtain those they, using available datasets, could assess to be more sustainable.

== Criticism ==
Efforts toward "greener" products are supported in the sustainability community; however, these are often viewed only as incremental steps and not as an end. Some people foresee a true sustainable steady state economy that may be very different from today's: greatly reduced consumerism, reduced energy usage, minimal ecological footprint, fewer consumer packaged goods, local purchasing with short food supply chains, little processed foods, etc.

Less products and packaging would be needed in a sustainable carbon-neutral economy, which means that fewer options would exist and simpler and more durable forms may be necessary.

== See also ==
- Circular economy
- Cradle to Cradle Design
- Design life
- Downcycling
- Durability
- Green brands
- Greenwashing
- Maintainability
- Product life
- Upcycling
- Life cycle assessment
- Index of sustainability articles
- Environmentally friendly
- Sustainable consumption
- Sustainable living
- Sustainable product development
- Zero waste
