= Anti-Waste and Circular Economy Law =

French environmental sustainability legislation

France's anti-waste law for a circular economy (la loi anti-gaspillage pour une économie circulaire) was passed in an effort to eliminate improper disposal of waste as well as limit excessive waste. This law is part of Europe's larger environmental activism efforts and builds on previous laws the country has passed.

The law aims to reduce the country's production and use of single-use plastic massively and to promote a more circular economic structure. Similarly to the United States' Reduce, reuse and recycle efforts, the anti-waste law acts similarly in promoting more eco-friendly consumer behaviors as well as holding producers to the same standards.

On the product production side, the anti-waste law bans the incineration of unsold and unused goods. The law forces manufacturers to repurpose the products which include but is not limited to donating and recycling. This includes recycling, donating and repurposing the scraps that are left over when new products are made. Furthermore, the law requires repairability indexes on products, this helps consumers recycle and repair products before buying them new or throwing them away, promoting a more circular economy.

== History ==
The European-Union's environmental efforts began several years ago with one of their more well-known contributions: the EU Ecolabel, a label that manufacturers volunteer to put on their products that applies to those "with a low environmental impact throughout their life cycle, from the extraction of raw material through to production, use and disposal." To use the label, all requirements of the label must be met which include "the use of biocides, water consumption and water discharge, air emissions and the use of hazardous substances." It also covers product safety requirements for the consumer." The Ecolabel was a larger EU effort that began France's circular economy efforts.

In 2010, the European Union passed Directive 2010/75/EC that addressed the EU's efforts toward preventing and limiting environmental pollution.

In 2013, the European Union began their "Single Market for Green Products Initiative" that called attention to individual environmental impact and individual environmental footprint.

In 2018, the EU amends prior Directive 2008/98/EC. "The Waste Framework Directive requires for the first time that the Member States set up separate waste collection for textiles, including a deadline for implementation."

== Background ==
The law was first presented on July 10, 2019, by France's Minister of State and Minister for the Ecological and Inclusive Transition, François de Rugy, and Secretaries of State to the Minister of State and Minister for the Ecological and Inclusive Transition, Brune Poirson and Emmanuelle Wargon.

The initial proposal outlined the goals and objectives for the new law as well as the positive environmental impact that it would have. The four main areas that the law covers are as follows:

1. Preservation of natural resources by cutting back on waste production.
2. More eco-friendly means of production for products.
3. Strengthening consumers’ access to product and production information.
4. Improving the system through which waste is collected and ensuring companies are legally and ethically disposing of products.

The law was passed on February 10, 2020, and put into effect on February 11, 2020. On Feb. 11, the law was published for public viewing on the Légifrance website. The final law that was passed has 130 articles and six sections that break it down into different areas.

=== Statistics ===
In the developmental stages of creating the initial proposal for the anti-waste law, French law, and policymakers worked closely with environmental agencies to create a comprehensive, all-encompassing approach. As reported by the French non-profit donation agency "L'Agence du Don en Nature", "630 million euros of products are destroyed each year, i.e. equivalent to 7 times the sum received for the Téléthon 2018".

== Law ==
=== I: Strategic Objectives for Waste Production Management and Prevention (covering articles one through 11) ===
This section covers the phased approach to reducing the use of disposable plastic until it is no longer used or produced in France. With these efforts, disposable plates, containers and utensils at fast-food restaurants will be replaced with reusable, more sustainable options. Disposable tableware includes both single-use plastic and cardboard items. As of Jan. 1, 2023, restaurants must serve dine-in customers with reusable tableware. Furthermore, there will be a prohibition on using the word "biodegradable" on product packaging due to "lack of scientific consensus". Additional product bans include the following:

- Polystyrene boxes (as of January 2021)
- Plastic tea-bags (as of January 2022)
- Plastic toys often provided with a children's menu (as of January 2022)
- Plastic confetti (as of January 2021)
- Importation of plastic bags (as of January 2021)
- Plastic wrap on produce (as of January 2022)

=== II: Consumer Information (covering articles 12 to 29) ===
Informing consumers of the sustainability, repairability and recyclability of the products they purchase is a vital piece of the anti-waste law. The law posits that better informed consumers will make better environmentally friendly decisions when it comes to what they purchase. Electronic products being manufactured and sold in France must provide a repairability index that assesses the following categories of a product: documentation, disassembly, availability of spare parts for the product, price of spare parts, and product-specific aspects. "Each criterion is scored on 20 points and each number is then compiled into an aggregate score out of 100, which is then divided by 10 and rounded to 1 decimal digit to make the final grade."

=== III: Promoting Repurposing, Reusing, and Recycling (covering articles 30-60) ===
The law also strictly prohibits the destruction of unsold goods – something many manufacturers and businesses have been accused of doing in recent years. This applies to food products, textile products, and hygiene products and will be enacted in a staged approach between 2021 and 2023. France's robust recycling system was given an update with the anti-waste law being passed. Now, as of January 2023, French residents can recycle any product that comes in plastic packaging in the yellow bins provided throughout France and not have to worry about sorting things themselves. Similarly to the section on consumer information, this section also urges consumers to reuse and repurpose older products in order to reduce waste as much as possible.

=== IV: The Responsibility of Producers (covering articles 61 to 92) ===
The vast majority of this section covers the policy referred to as the "polluter pays" – this implies that producers will be fined for illegal and improper disposal of waste. Instead of making companies simply pay a fine, there is also a five-year-plan aspect that companies must complete in addition that covers how they will avoid issues like this in the future.

The law reads that: "Every five years, the producers subject to the polluter pays schemes will have to draw up a prevention and eco-design action plan for their products so that they contain more recycled material and are more recyclable on the national territory. Provision is made for PRO – producer’s responsibility organizations to be able to facilitate the drawing up of these plans whose implementation will remain in the hands of producers."

=== V: The Fight Against Wild Deposits (covering articles 93 to 106) ===
The section covering "wild deposits" is a continuation of improper waste disposal. Environmental pollution is the issue that these articles aim to address by detailing the legal ways that manufacturers can dispose of waste and where it should be done. To avoid greenwashing and similar false advertising, Articles 93 through 106 also place further guidelines on when companies can use terms like "biodegradable", "environmentally friendly", and "compostable".

=== Goals ===
The law has several goals and milestones to track the law's process since implementation. A main goal of the policy is to cut back on waste on an individual household scale and as an economy. The measurable statistics France's government is looking for are a "15% decrease in household trash per inhabitant by 2030" and "a 5% decrease in waste from economic activity".

By 2025, the law posits that the country's population will be recycling "100% of plastics" and will "end the use of single-use plastic packaging by 2040". "In 2021, it is prohibited to use straws, single-use cutlery, plastic stirrers, styrofoam boxes at fast-food restaurants, and free distribution of plastic bottles in businesses". As of 2022, it is illegal to sell produce in plastic packaging if the portion is under 1.5 kilograms and "public buildings must have a public water fountain". "In 2023, fast-food restaurants will no longer be allowed to use disposable plates and cups for on-premise consumption of food and beverages."

=== Looking ahead ===
==== 2024 ====
The ban on selling "medical devices containing microplastics" will be enacted in January 2024.

==== 2025 ====
- The requirement of microfibre filters in new washing machines to filter out the fibres before going into the water supply.
- Newspapers, magazines, and hard-copy publications will not be shipped in plastic wrapping post-production.
- Medical centers will be banned from using plastic containers to prepare baby food "to prevent exposure to endocrine disruptors".

==== 2026 ====
"France will ban the sale of cosmetic products that contain microplastics – such as shampoos, hair colouring products, shower gels and makeup removers."

== See also ==
- Ecolabel
- European environmental research and innovation policy
- Law of France
- Recycling
- Waste
- Waste management
- Zero waste
