= LG LF7700 =

- Manufacturer: LG Electronics
- Type: LCD Television
- Released: May 2009
- Media: Digital television
- Display: 32", 37", 42" or 47"LCD
- Input: 3 x HDMI, USB 2.0, RGB, Component, 2 x SCART, Bluetooth
- Dimensions: 1140.4 x 764.8 x 129.0mm (47" version inc. stand)
- Weight: 29.8kg (47" version inc. stand)

The LG LF7700 is an LCD television set with built-in FreeSat-HD. This is the first LG set with built-in FreeSat, following a partnership deal between LG and FreeSat in January 2009. Until then Panasonic were the only brand to offer TVs with built-in FreeSat. As of 2009 the LF7700 is the only LG product with built-in FreeSat currently on the market; LG hinted that the partnership could be extended to other products.

== Features ==
The television features:

- HD Ready 1080p
- Twin XD Engine
- Intelligent Sensor II
- TruMotion 100 Hz (42" / 47")
- 24p Real Cinema
- Dynamic Contrast Ratio: 80,000:1 (42" / 47") 50,000:1 (32" / 37")
- Invisible Speaker
- 3 HDMI 1.3 Deep Colour
- USB 2.0 (JPEG/MP3 Playback)
- AV mode (game, sport and cinema modes)
- Swivel Stand
- Energy Saving Trust Recommended (32"/37"/42")
- Available in 32"/37"/42"/47"

== Reception ==
What Hi-Fi? reviewed the 37 inch model and said: "Considering this is LG’s first foray into the world of Freesat TVs, the 37LF7700 should be applauded". They also reviewed the 47 inch model and wrote: "Whether you want Freesat or not, this is the pick of the big-screen bargains." CNET called the 42 inch model "an admirable effort at a reasonable price." TechRadar summarized: "It holds its own against the competition, but as ever the Freesat tuner comes at the expense of better features and performance, and it lacks good multi-sat options". The Register said it "delivers good image and audio quality" and it's "pretty good value for money".

== See also ==
- LG Electronics
- LG Display
