= Environmentally friendly process =

Sustainability and marketing term

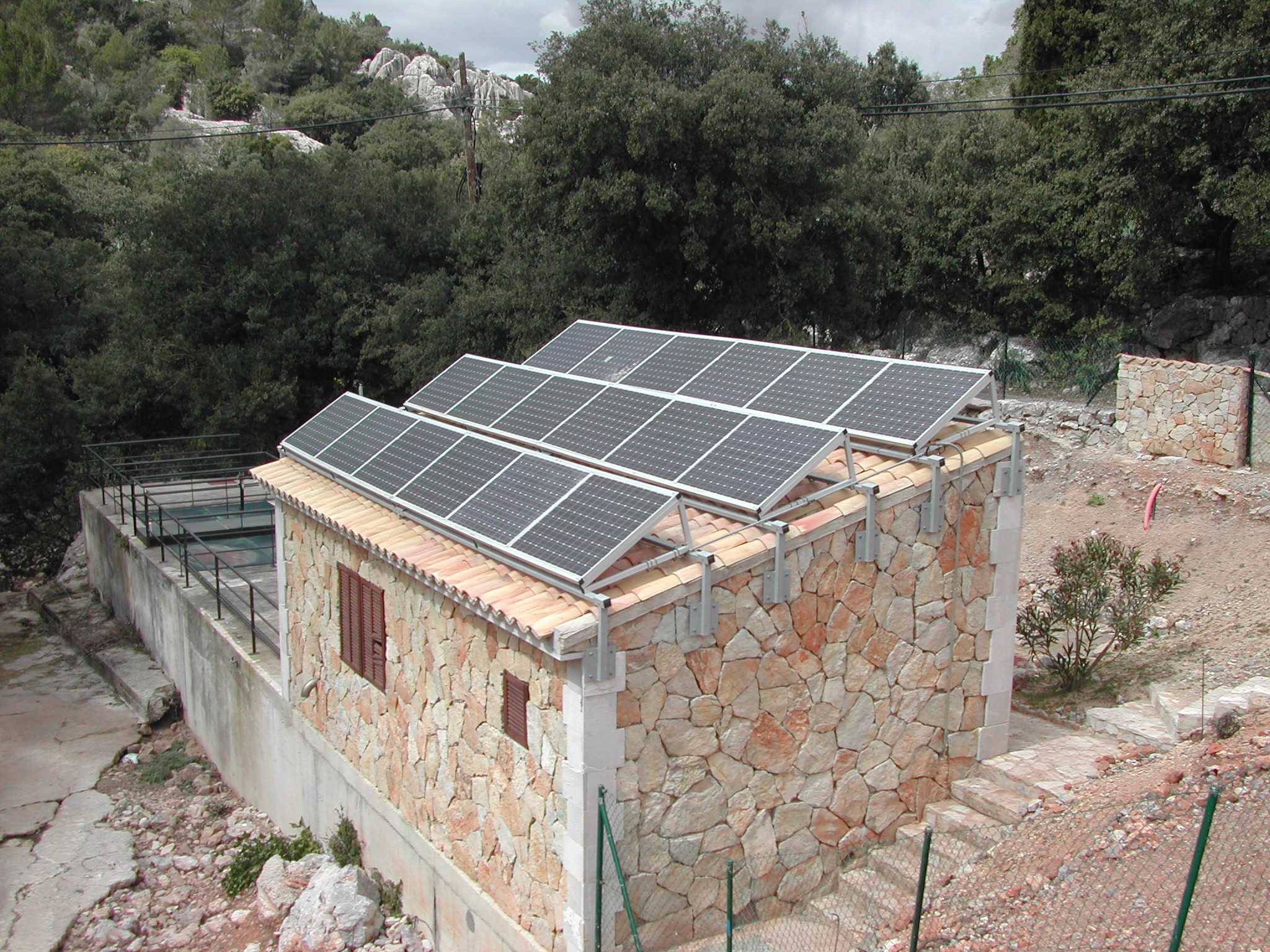
A sewage treatment plant that uses solar energy, located at Santuari de Lluc monastery in Spain.

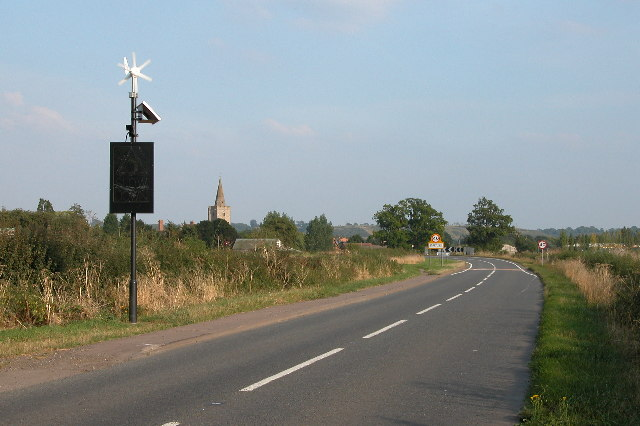
Environmentally friendly speed warning powered by solar and wind power.

Environmentally friendly processes – also called environment-friendly, eco-friendly, nature-friendly, or green processes – are a set of sustainability and marketing terms referring to goods and services, laws, guidelines, and policies that claim to reduce, minimize, or eliminate harm to ecosystems or the environment.

Companies use these ambiguous terms to promote goods and services, sometimes with additional, more specific certifications, such as ecolabels. Their overuse can be referred to as greenwashing. To ensure the successful meeting of Sustainable Development Goals (SDGs) companies are advised to employ environmental friendly processes in their production. Specifically, Sustainable Development Goal 12 measures 11 targets and 13 indicators "to ensure sustainable consumption and production patterns".

The International Organization for Standardization has developed ISO 14020 and ISO 14024 to establish principles and procedures for environmental labels and declarations that certifiers and eco-labellers should follow. In particular, these standards relate to the avoidance of financial conflicts of interest, the use of sound scientific methods and accepted test procedures, and openness and transparency in the setting of standards.

== Regional variants ==
=== Europe ===
Products located in members of the European Union can use the EU Ecolabel pending the EU's approval. EMAS is another EU label that signifies whether an organization management is green as opposed to the product. Germany also uses the Blue Angel, based on Germany's standard.

In Europe, there are many different ways that companies are using environmentally friendly processes, eco-friendly labels, and overall changing guidelines to ensure that there is less harm being done to the environment and ecosystems while their products are being made. In Europe, for example, many companies are already using EMAS labels to show that their products are friendly.

==== Companies ====
Many companies in Europe make putting eco-labels on their products a top-priority since it can result to an increase in sales when there are eco-labels on these products. In Europe specifically, a study was conducted that shows a connection between eco-labels and the purchasing of fish: "Our results show a significant connection between the desire for eco-labeling and seafood features, especially the freshness of the fish, the geographical origin of the fish and the wild vs farmed origin of the fish". This article shows that eco-labels are not only reflecting a positive impact on the environment when it comes to creating and preserving products, but also increase sales. However, not all European countries agree on whether certain products, especially fish, should have eco-labels. In the same article, it is remarked: "Surprisingly, the country effect on the probability of accepting a fish eco-label is tricky to interpret. The countries with the highest level of eco-labeling acceptability are Belgium and France". According to the same analysis and statistics, France and Belgium are most likely of accepting these eco-labels.

=== North America ===
In the United States, environmental marketing claims require caution. Ambiguous titles such as environmentally friendly can be confusing without a specific definition; some regulators are providing guidance. The United States Environmental Protection Agency has deemed some ecolabels misleading in determining whether a product is truly "green".

In Canada, one label is that of the Environmental Choice Program. Created in 1988, only products approved by the program are allowed to display the label.

Overall, Mexico was one of the first countries in the world to pass a specific law on climate change. The law set an obligatory target of reducing national greenhouse-gas emissions by 30% by 2020. The country also has a National Climate Change Strategy, which is intended to guide policymaking over the next 40 years.

=== Oceania ===
The Energy Rating Label is a Type III label that provides information on "energy service per unit of energy consumption". It was first created in 1986, but negotiations led to a redesign in 2000.

Oceania generates the second most e-waste, 16.1 kg, while having the third lowest recycling rate of 8.8%. Out of Oceania, only Australia has a policy in policy to manage e-waste, that being the Policy Stewardship Act published in 2011 that aimed to manage the impact of products, mainly those in reference to the disposal of products and their waste. Under the Act the National Television and Computer Recycling Scheme (NTCRS) was created, which forced manufactures and importers of electrical and electronic equipment (EEE) importing 5000 or more products or 15000 or more peripherals be liable and required to pay the NTCRS for retrieving and recycling materials from electronic products.

New Zealand does not have any law that directly manages their e-waste, instead they have voluntary product stewardship schemes such as supplier trade back and trade-in schemes and voluntary recycling drop-off points. Though this has helped it costs the provider money with labor taking up 90% of the cost of recycling. In addition, e-waste is currently not considered a priority product, which would encourage the enforcement of product stewardship. In Pacific Island Regions (PIR), e-waste management is a hard task since they lack the adequate amount of land to properly dispose of it even though they produce one of the lowest amounts of e-waste in the world due to their income and population. Due to this there are large stockpiles of waste unable to be recycled safely.

Currently, The Secretariat of the Pacific Regional Environment Programme (SPREP), an organization in charge of managing the natural resources and environment of the Pacific region, is in charge of region coordination and managing the e-waste of the Oceania region. SPREP uses Cleaner Pacific 2025 as a framework to guide the various governments in the region. They also work with PacWaste (Pacific Hazardous Waste) to identify and resolve the different issues with waste management of the islands, which largely stem from the lack of government enforcement and knowledge on the matter. They have currently proposed a mandatory product stewardship policy be put in place along with an advance recycling fee which would incentivize local and industrial recycling. They are also in the mindset that the islands should collaborate and share resources and experience to assist in the endeavor.

With the help from the NTCRS, though the situation has improved they have been vocal about the responsibilities of stakeholders in the situation and how they need to be more clearly defined. In addition to there being a differences in state and federal regulations, with only Southern Australia, Australian Capital Territory, and Victoria having banned e-waste landfill, it would be possible to make this apply the rest of the region if a federal decision was made. They have also advocated for reasonable access to collection points for waste, with there being only one collection point within a 100 km radius in some cases. It has been shown that the reason some residents do not recycle is because of their distance from a collection point. In addition, there have been few campaigns to recycle, with the company, Mobile Muster, a voluntary collection program managed by the Australian Mobile Telecommunication Association, aimed to collect phones before they went to a landfill and has been doing so since 1999. Upon further study, it was found that only 46% of the public was award of the program, which later increased to 74% in 2018, but this was after an investment of $45 million from the Australian Mobile Telecommunication Association.

=== Asia ===
"Economic growth in Asia has increased in the past three decades and has heightened energy demand, resulting in rising greenhouse gas emissions and severe air pollution. To tackle these issues, fuel switching and the deployment of renewables are essential." However, as countries continue to advance, it leads to more pollution as a result of increased energy consumption. In recent years, the biggest concern for Asia is its air pollution issues. Major Chinese cities such as Beijing have received the worst air quality rankings (Li et al., 2017). Seoul, the capital of South Korea, also suffers from air pollution (Kim et al., 2017). Currently, Indian cities such as Mumbai and Delhi are overtaking Chinese cities in the ranking of worst air quality. In 2019, 21 of the world's 30 cities with the worst air quality were in India."

The environmentally friendly trends are marketed with a different color association, using the color blue for clean air and clean water, as opposed to green in western cultures. Japanese- and Korean-built hybrid vehicles use the color blue instead of green all throughout the vehicle, and use the word "blue" indiscriminately.

==== China ====
According to Shen, Li, Wang, and Liao, the emission trading system that China had used for its environmentally friendly journey was implemented in certain districts and was successful in comparison to those which were used in test districts that were approved by the government. This shows how China tried to effectively introduce new innovative systems to impact the environment. China implemented multiple ways to combat environmental problems even if they didn't succeed at first. It led to them implementing a more successful process which benefited the environment. Although China needs to implement policies like, "The “fee-to-tax” process should be accelerated, however, and the design and implementation of the environmental tax system should be improved. This would form a positive incentive mechanism in which a low level of pollution correlates with a low level of tax." By implementing policies like these companies have a higher incentive to not over pollute the environment and instead focus on creating an eco-friendlier environment for their workplaces. In doing so, it will lead to less pollution being emitted while there also being a cleaner environment. Companies would prefer to have lower taxes to lessen the costs they have to deal with, so it encourages them to avoid polluting the environment as much as possible.

=== International ===
Energy Star is a program with a primary goal of increasing energy efficiency and indirectly decreasing greenhouse gas emissions. Energy Star has different sections for different nations or areas, including the United States, the European Union and Australia. The program, which was founded in the United States, also exists in Canada, Japan, New Zealand, and Taiwan. Additionally, the United Nations Sustainable Development Goal 17 has a target to promote the development, transfer, dissemination, and diffusion of environmentally friendly technologies to developing countries as part of the 2030 Agenda.

== See also ==
- Climate justice
- Cradle-to-cradle design
- Design for Environment
- Ecolabel
- Environmental Choice Program
- Environmental enterprise
- Environmental movement
- Environmental organizations
- Environmental protection
- Environmentalism
- Green brands
- Green trading
- Greenwashing
- List of environmental issues
- List of environmental organizations
- List of environmental topics
- Market-based instruments
- Natural capital
- Natural resource
- Renewable energy
- Sustainability
  - Sustainable products
  - Corporate sustainability
