= Green Seal =

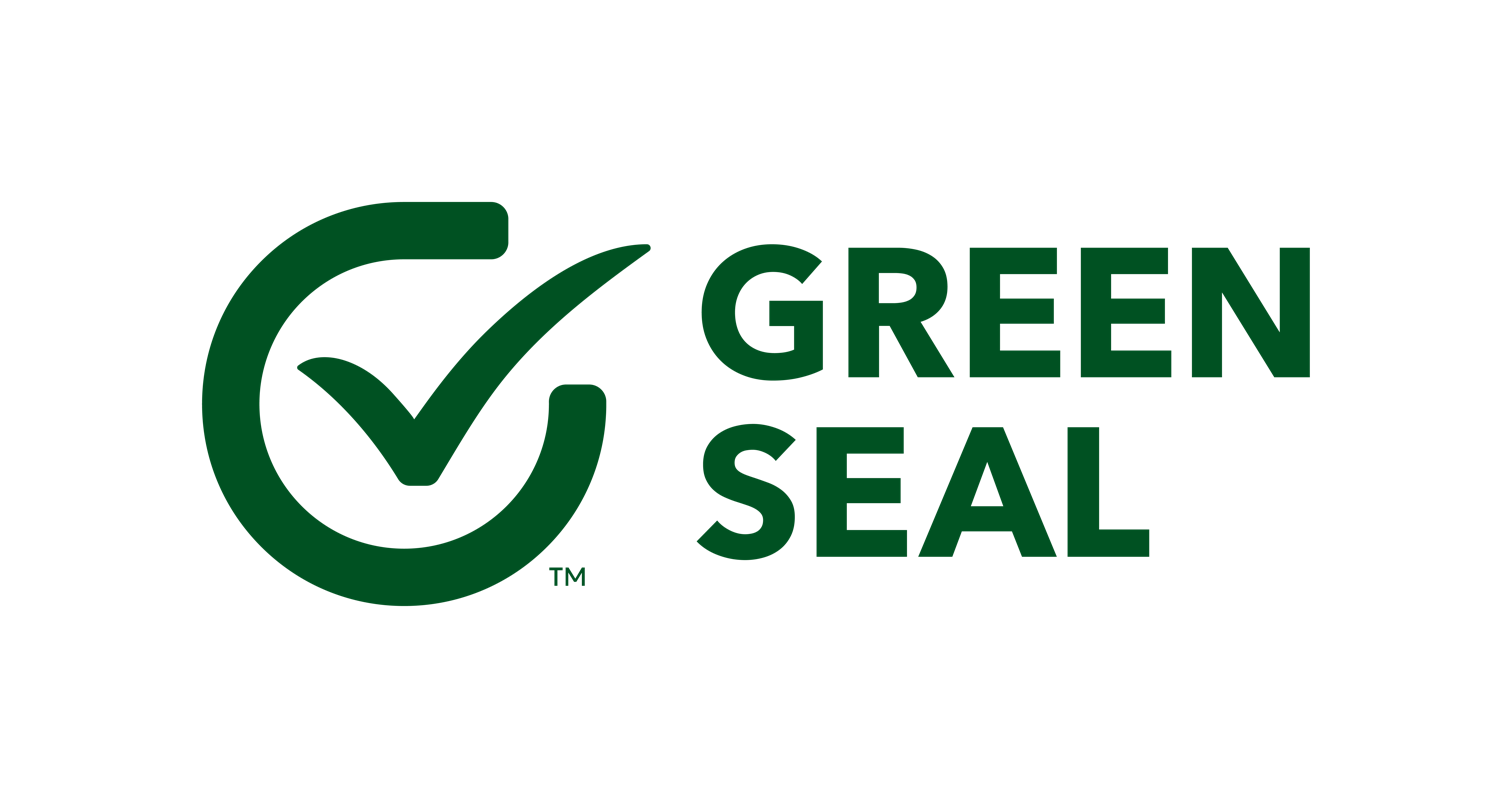
- Formation: 1989
- Type: Non-governmental organization
- Purpose: Environmentalism, sustainability
- Headquarters: Washington, DC USA
- Chair: Nancy Hersh
- CEO: Doug Gatlin
- Vice Chair: Brenna Walraven
- Secretary: Edward Hubbard
- Website: https://greenseal.org/

Green Seal is a global non-profit environmental standard development and certification organization committed to making sustainability everyone’s business. Its flagship program is the certification of products and services. Certification is based on Green Seal standards, which contain performance, health, and sustainability criteria.

The Green Seal is an ecolabel used by product manufacturers and services providers. More than 100 federal, state, and local purchasing policies specify and rely on Green Seal to signal products that meet a high benchmark of health and environmental leadership. Products and services certified to Green Seal standards are listed in the Green Seal Certified Directory. The Green Seal Certification Mark is registered with the United States Patent and Trademark Office.

Green Seal is a U.S. member and co-founder of Global Ecolabelling Network (GEN), which consists of 27 international ecolabeling programs, including Germany's Blue Angel, the EU Ecolabel, and the Nordic swan. Green Seal meets the Criteria for Third-Party Certifiers of the United States Environmental Protection Agency, the requirements for standard development organizations of the American National Standards Institute, and the principles for environmental labels of the International Organization for Standardization (ISO 14020 and 14024).

== History ==
Since its founding in 1989, Green Seal has developed environmental standards for hundreds of categories of products and services. Green Seal published a series of buying guides for purchasers in the 1990s (the Choose Green Reports) and at that time began providing technical assistance to Federal, State, and local governments and other institutions' environmental purchasing, operations, and facilities management. In the early 2000s, the certification program focused primarily on building maintenance. In 2006, the US Green Building Council LEED rating system included several Green Seal standards in their criteria. Practice Greenhealth, the AASHE STARS program, and the Green Ribbon Schools Program of the U.S. Department of Education, among others, reference Green Seal standards. According to a 2010 study by the Responsible Purchasing Network, the Green Seal was recognized by 95% of purchasers and used by 76%.

== Standards and certification ==
Products and services must meet the requirements in Green Seal standards in order to achieve certification. The standards are based on a life cycle approach, considering such impacts as those from raw materials extraction, manufacturing, use, and re-use or disposal. The evaluation process includes review of data; assessment of labeling, marketing, and promotional materials; and on-site auditing. Products or services become certified by Green Seal after these evaluations are completed. Regular compliance monitoring is required to maintain certification.

Green Seal sets standards and certifies products and services in the following categories:

- Building Restoration Products
- Cleaning Products
- Laundry Care Products
- Personal Care Products
- Plastic Trash Bags and Can Liners
- Sanitary Paper Products
- Commercial and Institutional Cleaning Services
- Hotels & Lodging Properties

== Institutional greening programs ==
Green Seal works and worked with government agencies, healthcare facilities, universities, and other institutions and companies on sustainable purchasing, operations, and facilities management.

- Green business projects have included the City of Los Angeles Green Business Program and Green Lodging Program, the City of Chicago Green Hotels Initiative, and the Pennsylvania Green Hotels Program.
- Green purchasing projects have included assisting in green procurement for the State of California Procurement Division; City of Los Angeles Green Purchasing Action Plan; Inter-American Development Bank (IDB) Environmentally and Socially Responsible Procurement Program; Los Angeles County Green Procurement Manual; National Park Service Green Purchasing Manual; State of Colorado Green Purchasing Evaluation and Training; Multi-State Department of Transportation Environmentally Preferable Purchasing Guide; and the World Bank Purchasing Program.
- Green building operations and maintenance projects have included specifications for the City of Philadelphia; an operations and maintenance manual for the Commonwealth of Pennsylvania; environmental evaluations for the Inter-American Development Bank (IDB) and the World Bank headquarters facilities; a green facilities plan for the Susquehanna Association for the Blind and Visually Impaired (SABVI); an environmental facilities assessment of the three University of Miami campuses; and an operations and maintenance manual for Public Housing Authorities developed in conjunction with Siemens Industries.

== Green Seal publications ==
Green Seal publishes books and articles on sustainability including:

- Greening Food and Beverage Services: a Green Seal Guide to Transforming the Industry
- Green Building Operations & Maintenance Manual: a Guide for Public Housing Authorities
- NACo Green Purchasing Toolkit

== See also ==
- Environment of the United States
- Global Ecolabelling Network
- ISO 14000
- Life cycle assessment
