= Motiva Oy =

Finnish government-owned enterprise

Motiva Oy is a Finnish state company, which promotes the efficient and sustainable use of energy and materials. Its customers include both the public and private sectors. The Motiva Group also includes Motiva Services Ltd which provides companies and corporations with energy efficiency consultancy services and manages the Nordic swan and EU Ecolabel in Finland.

Motiva's operations started in 1993 as a service center for energy conservation, (Energiansäästön palvelukeskus) under the Finnish government. Its initial mandate focused on promoting energy efficiency in buildings and supporting the government's energy saving programme through information provision, audits, and support for practical implementation measures. In the 1998 a new task was added: the promotion of renewable energy. Motiva was reformed into a state-owned joint stock company in November 2000. As attention to material resources and environmental impacts grew, Motiva added material efficiency to its core activities in the late 2000s, with a notable focus on practical initiatives from around 2011 onward.

Motiva Oy and Motiva Services Ltd had a combined staff of approximately 60 in May 2017 and net sales of approximately EUR 8.16 million in 2015.

In 2023, Motiva Oy and Motiva Services Oy employed 68 people, with a turnover of 7.6 million euros. The full group, including Ympäristömerkintä Suomi Oy, had 89 employees and a turnover of 10.1 million euros.
