= Tersano =

Tersano Inc.
- Type: Privately held
- Founded: Windsor, Ontario, Canada (2001)
- Founder: Steve Hengsperger
- Headquarters: 3440 North Talbot Road, Oldcastle, Ontario N0R 1L0, Canada
- Website: ca.tersano.com

Tersano Inc. is a privately held company based in Oldcastle, Ontario with offices and distribution centres throughout Canada, USA, Latin America, APAC and EMEA.

Established in 2001, Tersano develops and manufactures devices that produce Stabilized Aqueous Ozone (SAO) for personal and professional use. It serves clients in industries such as healthcare, education, manufacturing, and hospitality. Tersano was the first company to concurrently receive both the Green Seal 37 (for Industrial and Institutional Cleaners) and the Green Seal 53 (for Biologically Active Cleaning Products).

In 2006 the product was ready for its launch after being approved by the United States Environmental Protection Agency (EPA Establishment #: 89093-CAN-1), U.S. Food and Drug Administration (FDA), Canadian Standards Association (CSA) and Underwriters Laboratory. Since then Tersano has released more commercial and residential products such as ProScrub degreaser, ProBowl descaler, laundry pods, and microfiber cloths.

It was declared one of the best inventions in 2006 by Time Magazine. It has also received television media attention when the system was featured on an episode of “The Big Idea with Donny Deutsch”.
