= Motiva =

Motiva may refer to:

- Motiva (CCR), a Brazilian transportation company
- Motiva Enterprises, a Saudi-American refining joint venture
- Motiva Oy, a Finnish state sustainability company
