= Mayer-Kuvert =

Mayer-Kuvert-network
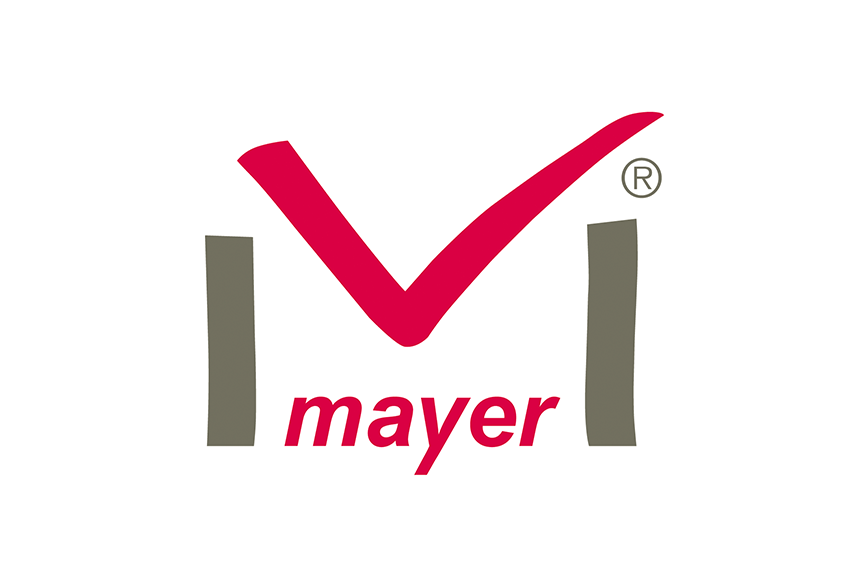
- Company type: GmbH
- Industry: Paper wholesale
- Founded: 1877
- Headquarters: Heilbronn, Germany
- Key people: Thomas Schwarz, Walter Pötter, Bernd Wiedmann
- Revenue: 216 million (2020)
- Number of employees: 1700 (2020)
- Website: www.mayer-kuvert-network.com

Mayer-Kuvert-network (also known as the Mayer Group) is a European manufacturer of envelopes, packaging and shipping materials. The company has its headquarters in Heilbronn.

== History ==
=== 1877–1950: Founding and World War II ===
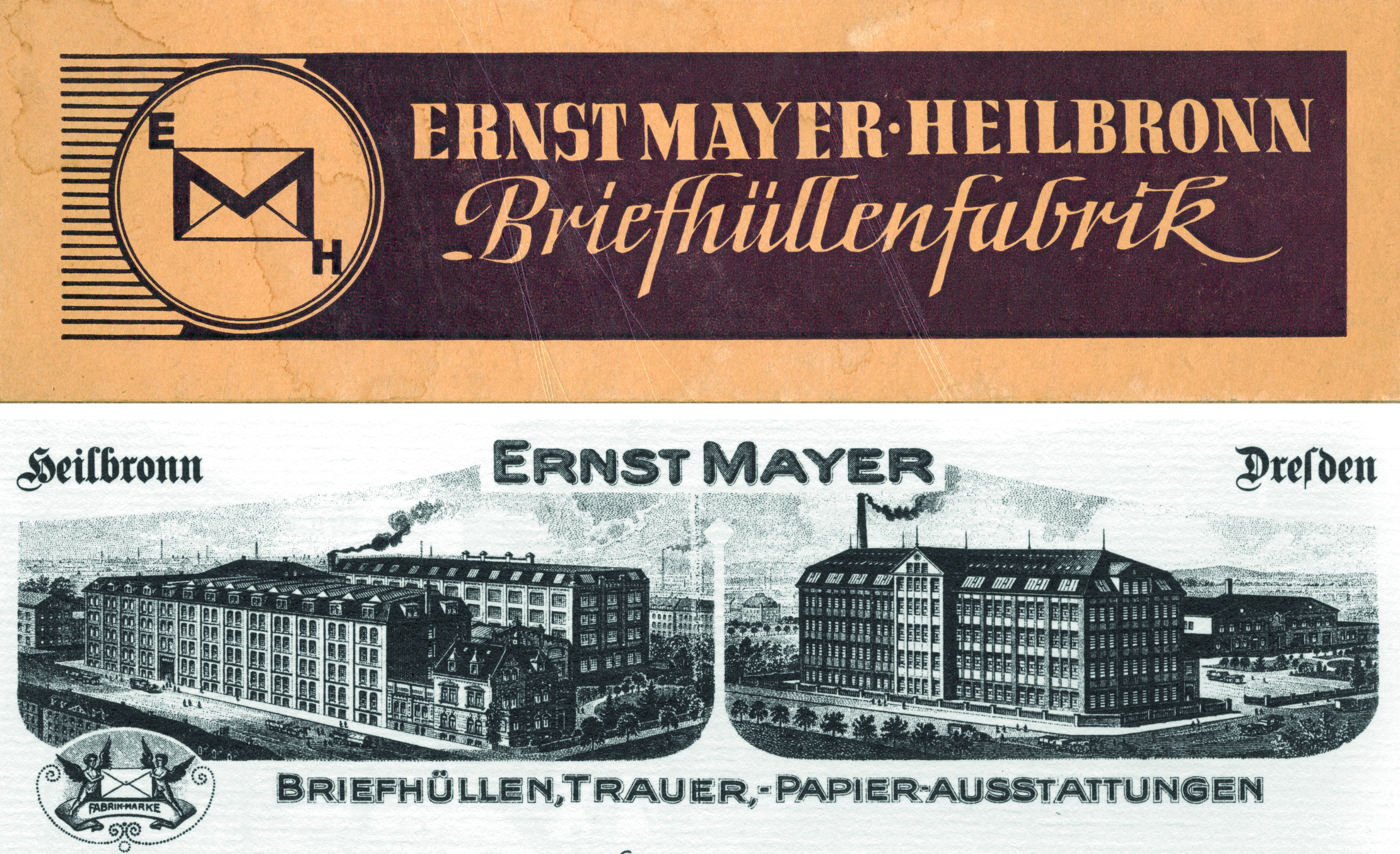
Headquarters of "Ernst Mayer Briefhüllenfabrik" in Heilbronn and Dresden, 1909

The company was founded in 1877 by Ernst Mayer as the "Ernst Mayer Briefhüllenfabrik" in Heilbronn. In 1878, Mayer bought the company's first folding machine at the Paris World Fair and in 1883 moved into new, self-built company premises. Mayer invented the gummed envelope and in 1909 opened a subsidiary in Dresden. In 1918, the company was called "Ernst Mayer - Briefhüllen, Trauer-, Papierausstattungen" (Ernst Mayer – Envelopes, Funerary and Paper Accroutements). The introduction of rotary presses in the 1920s allowed production to be developed further and the company employed a total of around 500 workers in the 1930s. During World War II, the entire production facilities were destroyed by British aerial bombs on 4 December 1944. After 1945, the Dresden subsidiary was nationalised as a nationally owned enterprise. Mayer's sons, Alfred and Erich, were awarded the Order of Merit of the Federal Republic of Germany in 1952 for the rapid reconstruction of the company after the end of the war.

=== 1960–2000: Expansion and development ===
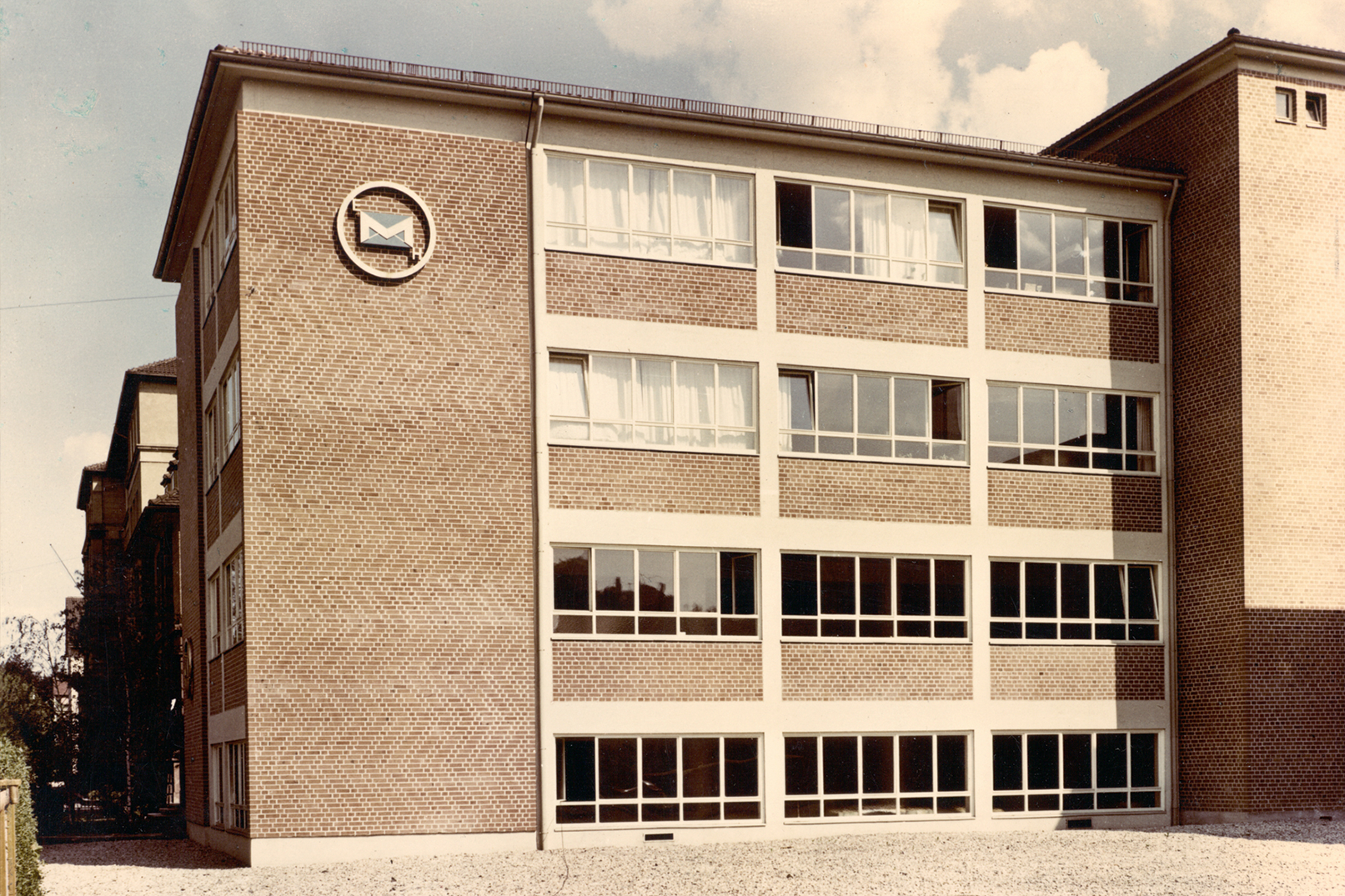
Building of "Ernst Mayer Briefhüllenfabrik" (Heilbronn, 1970)

In the 1960s and 1970s, around 100 machines were in use on the 8000 m^{2} factory floor in Heilbronn, processing around 4000 t of paper annually and producing from it approximately 400 million envelopes every year. By the end of the 1970s, Mayer had 200 employees and 9 independent representatives. The company plunged into the red in the 1980s due to fierce competition in the envelopes industry. In 1983, the Swedish paper processing concern Ljungdahls acquired 80% of the company as it stood on the brink of insolvency and transferred 26% of this ownership to Edlef Bartl. When the promised help failed to arrive from Ljungdahls, Bartl took over 100% of the company in 1984 and led it out of the crisis with an expansion of the product range and a restructuring of production and management processes. In 1986, Bartl founded BSB-Kuvert in Berlin with three reel-fed machines and in 1989 acquired competing company Lemppenau. In the same year, "Ernst Mayer" was renamed "Mayer-Kuvert". In 1991, the envelope factory in München-Pasing was taken over and in 1992, Bartl acquired from the Treuhandanstalt the GDR's largest envelope manufacturer, Torgau-Kuvert. In 1991, the new company building in Heilbronn was opened, uniting all production stages under one roof. In 1992, the company expanded to Czechia and in 1995 also to Romania and Poland, followed by Slovakia, Bulgaria, Ukraine, Russia and the Baltic states Estonia, Latvia and Lithuania in the late 1990s.

=== 2000–2012: Mayer-Kuvert-network ===
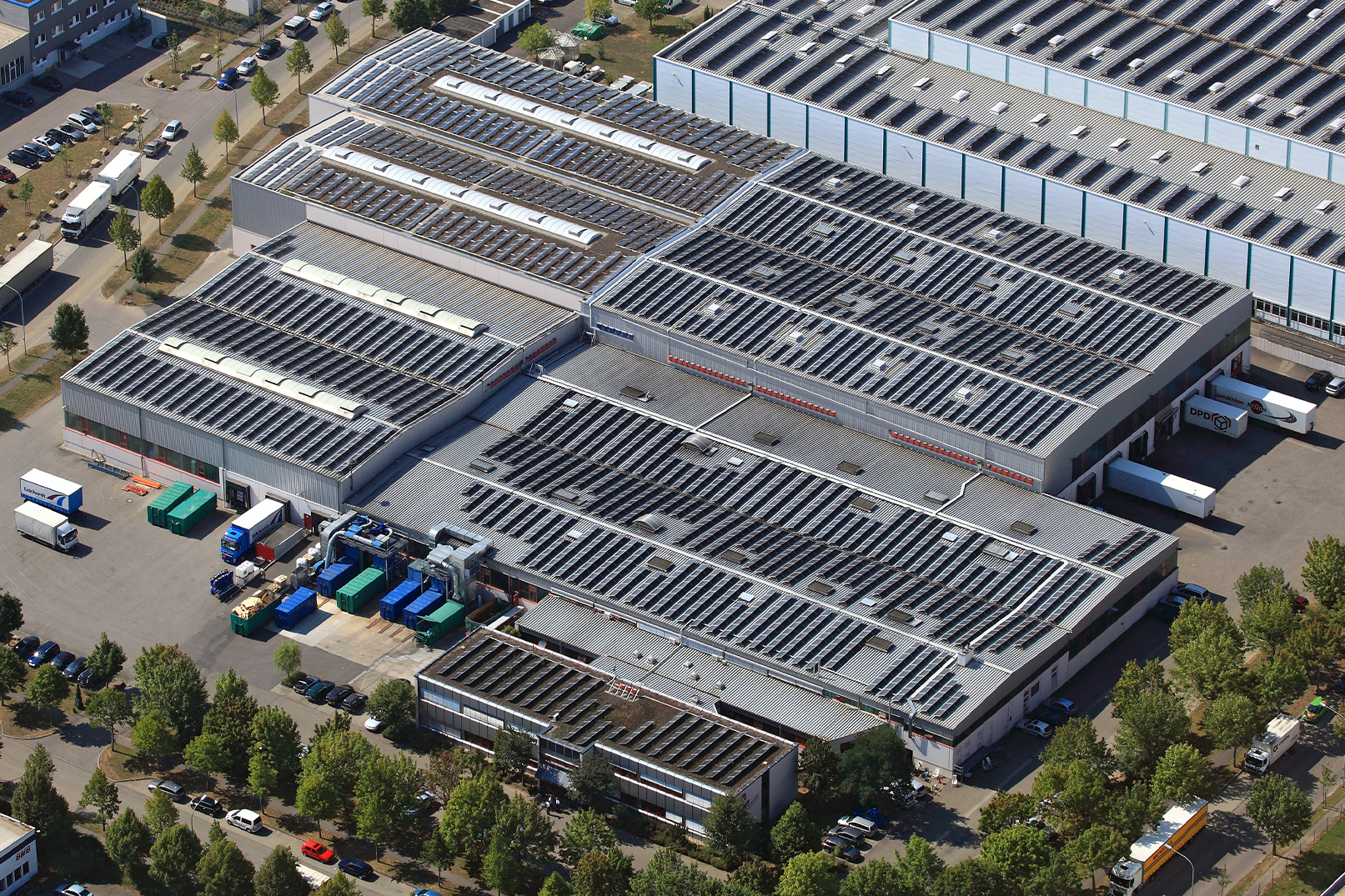
Aerial view of the headquarters of Mayer-Kuvert-network in Heilbronn

In 2003, the company became Mayer-Kuvert-network. Over the next years, Mayer-Kuvert-network took over other companies in Europe: In 2006, two production facilities of Antalis Envelopes in the UK were acquired. In 2008, Mayer-Kuvert-network took over 50% of the Danish company A-Mail Kuverter as well as Herlitz PBS AG. In the same year, the competing company BlessOF, which was threatened with insolvency, was added, followed by NC-Couvert in 2010. In 2011, the Mayer Group took over and restructured French envelope company GPV Groupe, which was a supplier for the French postal service among others. In 2012, Belgian printers de Vroede and Data Impress were acquired. In 2012, the consortium consolidated its sales activities of the affiliates Mayer-Kuvert, BlessOF and Clausnitzer & Kupa-Kuvert in the Vertriebsgesellschaft mayer-network.

=== After 2014: Death of Bartl and realignment ===
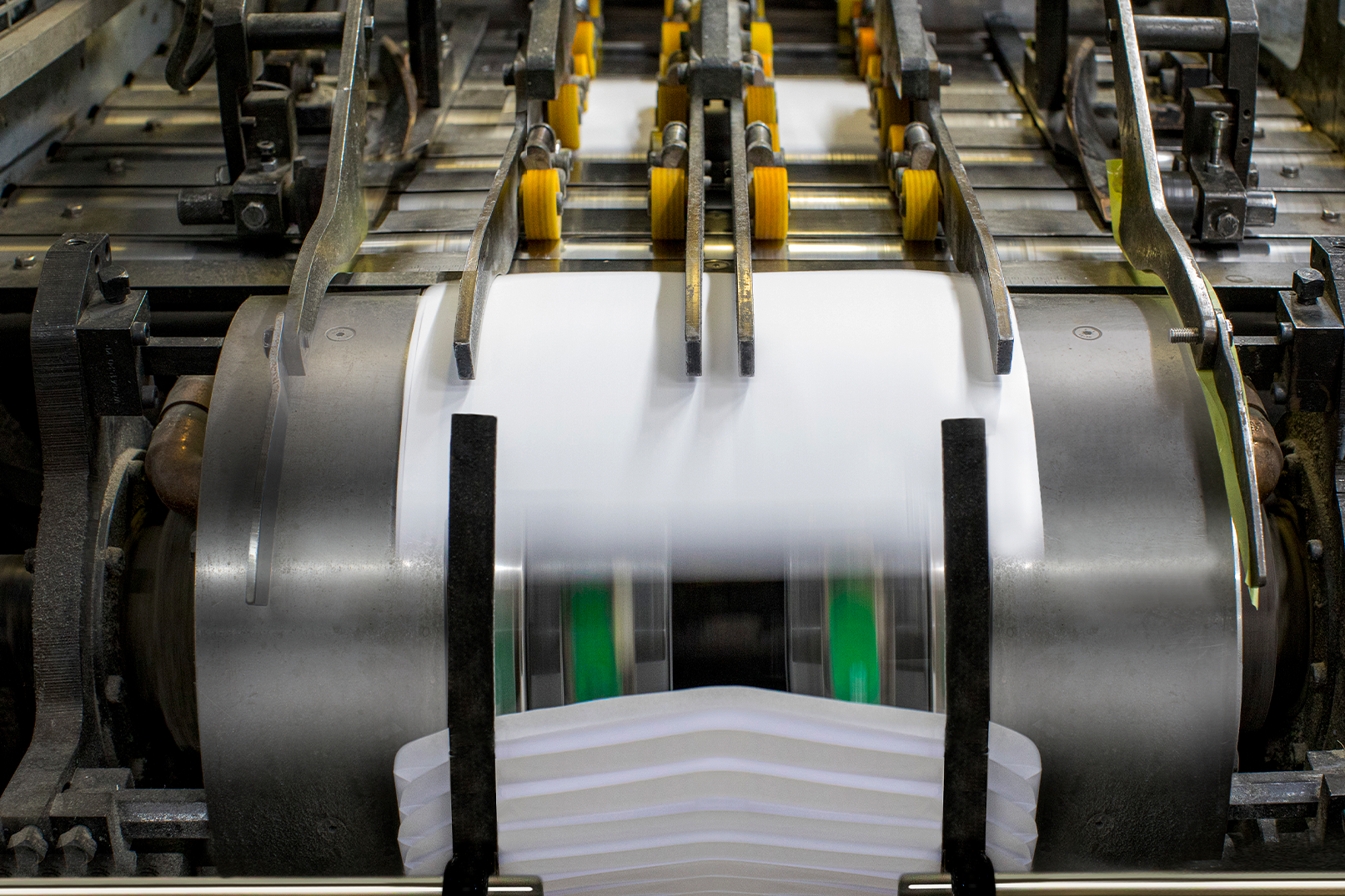
Envelope production, 2020

Managing director Bartl died suddenly in 2014. At this point in time, the consortium comprised 50 companies in 23 countries with around 2400 employees producing more than 21 billion envelopes, shipping bags and folding bags, annually. Bartl's successor was his son-in-law Thomas Schwarz, who had already been appointed CO-CEO in 2013, together with an eight-person management team. In 2017, insolvency proceedings were opened for the BlessOF company and were successfully concluded in the same year.

Since 2017, the company has been undertaking comprehensive realignment, its "Mission 2020", which was made possible by the majority takeover of the Group by a Family Office in 2018: Unprofitable production facilities in Germany and elsewhere were closed and existing locations consolidated.

== Company structure ==
The envelope manufacturer is a limited liability company and consists of 30 companies including Torgau-Kuvert, BlessOF, Mayer-Kuvert, mayer-network and novadex. The Group has locations in 15 countries in western and eastern Europe, including in Belgium, Denmark, Great Britain, Ireland, France and Norway. The Group is divided into three fields of business: envelopes and pocket envelopes, light paper packaging, and new media and services. In November 2019, the Mayer Group established mayer-digital as a digital sales unit and centre of competence for the whole company. Since 2018, Walter Pötter and Bernd Wiedmann have been part of the executive management of the Mayer Group in addition to Thomas Schwarz.

== Products ==
Envelopes, pocket envelopes and light packaging materials as well as custom-made products form the Group's core business. Since the market for envelopes has been in decline for years, the Mayer Group has been expanding and gradually further developing their offering of digital brand communication since 2011. On 136 reel-fed and 59 blank-fed machines, the Group produces around 15 billion envelopes annually.

== Sustainability ==
In 2009, the company produced the world's first CO_{2}-neutral envelope. The Mayer Group has been awarded the Blue Angel ecolabel. Since 2010, envelopes and pocket envelopes bearing the PEFC/04-31-1402 ecolabel are guaranteed to be made out of paper from sustainable forestry. Mayer-Kuvert-network has been a Klimaschutz-Unternehmen (Climate Protection Company) since November 2020.
