= Environmental Choice New Zealand =

Environmental Choice New Zealand logo

Environmental Choice New Zealand (ECNZ) is the official ecolabel of New Zealand. The label is owned and endorsed by the Ministry for the Environment of the New Zealand Government. The Environmental Choice programme, which started in 1992, is administered by the New Zealand Ecolabelling Trust on behalf of, but independently from, the Ministry for the Environment. The trust and the programme are part of the Global Ecolabelling Network.

The label identifies products and services that meet high-quality environmental standards throughout their life cycle. It is New Zealand's only ISO Type I ecolabel and the country's most comprehensive and robust product-focused certification. About 2000 products and services are eligible to carry the label.

== See also ==
- Green marketing
