= EKOenergy =

International ecolabel for renewable energy

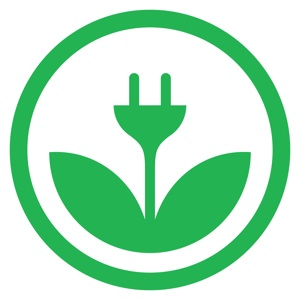
- Formation: 2013
- Type: Nonprofit organization
- Purpose: Promotion of renewable energy, climate action, nature conservation
- Headquarters: Helsinki, Finland
- Coordinates: 60.15315307591925°N 24.87901093177771°E
- Region served: Worldwide
- Official language: English (+ provides services in more than 20 languages)
- Main organ: EKOenergy's steering group, which reports to the Board of the Finnish Association for Nature Conservation
- Parent organization: Finnish Association for Nature Conservation (Suomen luonnonsuojeluliitto ry)
- Website: www.ekoenergy.org

EKOenergy is a globally active nonprofit ecolabel for renewable energy (electricity, gas, and heat and cold). It is owned by the Finnish Association for Nature Conservation and managed in cooperation with other environmental NGOs.

EKOenergy started in 2013 in Europe. Nowadays, EKOenergy-labelled energy is available worldwide. In 2022, the label was used in more than 70 countries. Its materials are available in more than 20 languages.

== Awards and recognition ==
- European Citizen's Prize 2020, awarded by the European Parliament in 2021.
- Mentioned as a good SDG (Sustainable Development Goal) Practice by UN Department of Economic and Social Affairs in 2020.
- Nordic Council Environment Award 2019, nomination.
- EU Sustainable Energy Awards, nomination in the Young Energy Leaders category.
- Mentioned as a good way to create additional impact in various publications of CDP and the RE100.

== Label ==
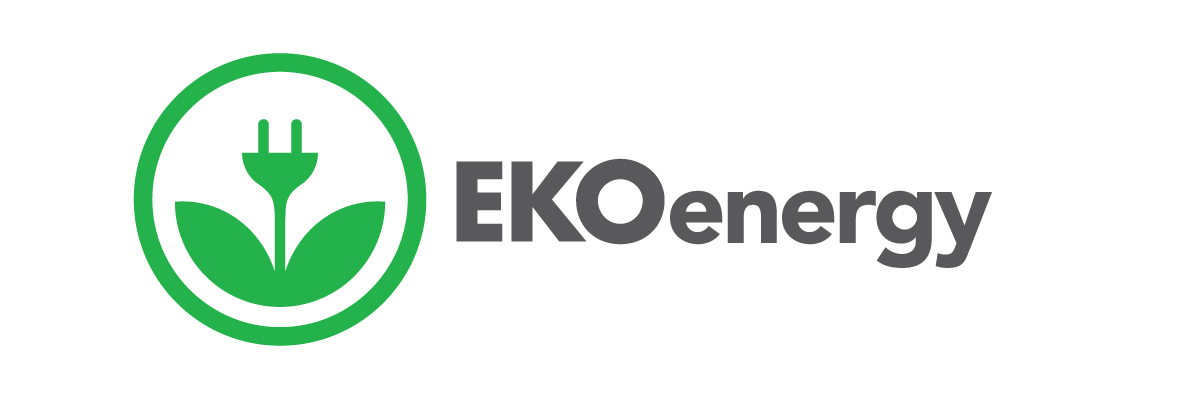

Other language version of the label can be found in various countries. E.g. EKOénergie in France, EKOenergie in Germany or EKOenergia in Finland.

=== Criteria of the ecolabel ===
EKOenergy's criteria are approved and updated following the rules of the ISEAL Standard Setting Code. All criteria texts are publicly available on EKOenergy's website.

The criteria take following aspects into account.

- Reliable tracking and avoidance of double counting.
- Sustainability: EKOenergy takes into account the impacts of electricity production on ecosystem services, habitats and the biodiversity of species.
- Additional impact: Consumers of EKOenergy contribute to the additional promotion of renewable energy in various ways. For every MWh sold, 0.10€ goes to EKOenergy's Climate Fund. These resources are used to finance renewable energy projects in developing countries. Consumers also pay 0.08€ per MWh to support EKOenergy's work to promote renewable energy worldwide and set up renewable energy campaigns. EKOenergy's work to promote renewable energy is recognised as an Energy Compact under the UN-Energy Programme.
- Auditing and verification.

=== Logo ===
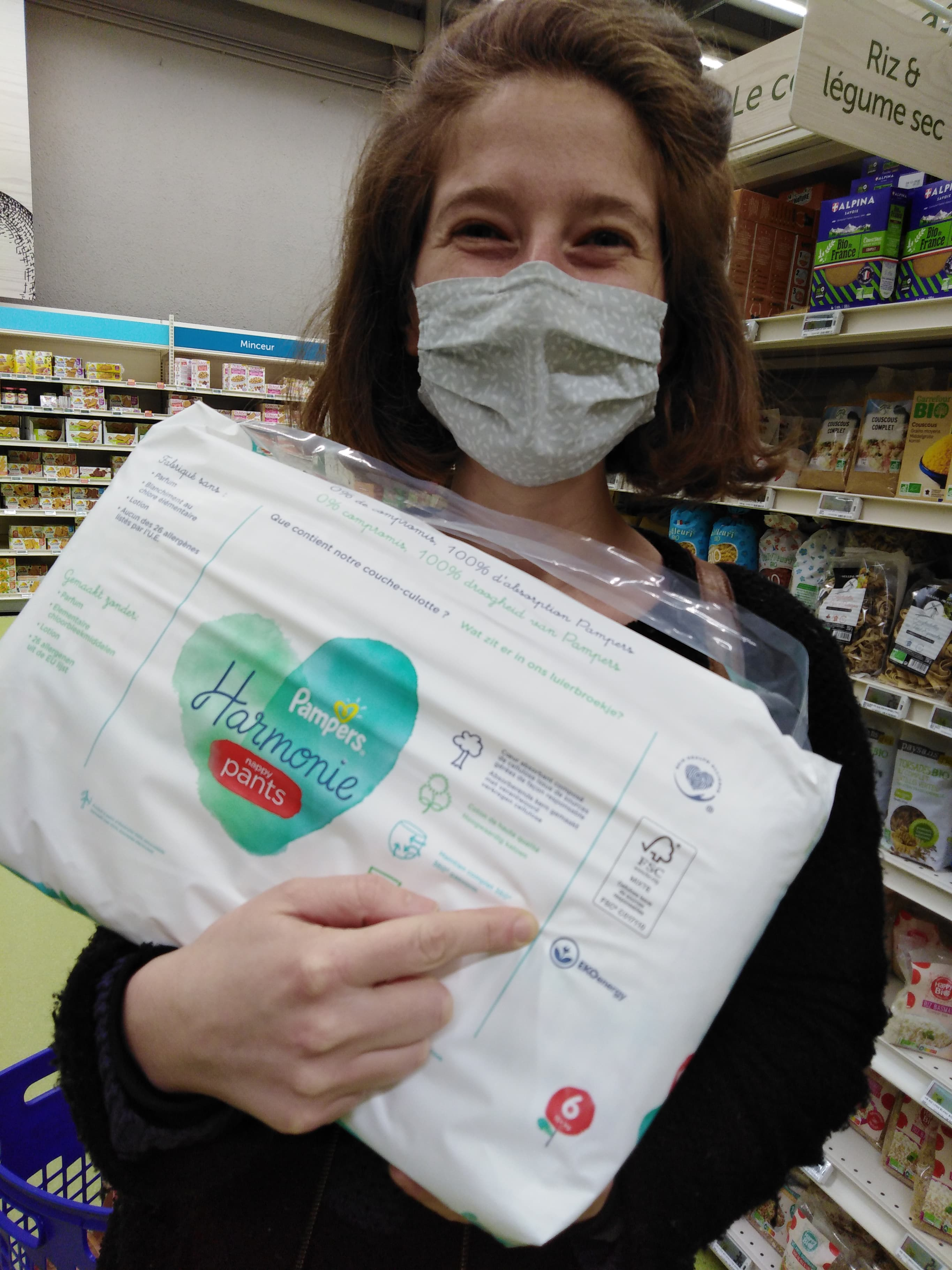
EKOenergy logo on diapers made by P&G (Pampers)

The EKOenergy logo depicts a green plug sprouting from a plant flanked by two leaves. The logo can only be used by authorised sellers, when they are selling EKOenergy-labelled energy, and by consumers of EKOenergy-labelled energy. The conditions are explained in EKOenergy's brand book.

The logo can be found on products made using EKOenergy-labelled electricity/energy.

=== Users of EKOenergy ===
Well-known users of EKOenergy-ecolabelled electricity include the European telecom operator Iliad Group, Microsoft, the German glass manufacturer SCHOTT, SAP and Pampers (Procter & Gamble).

== Concrete results ==
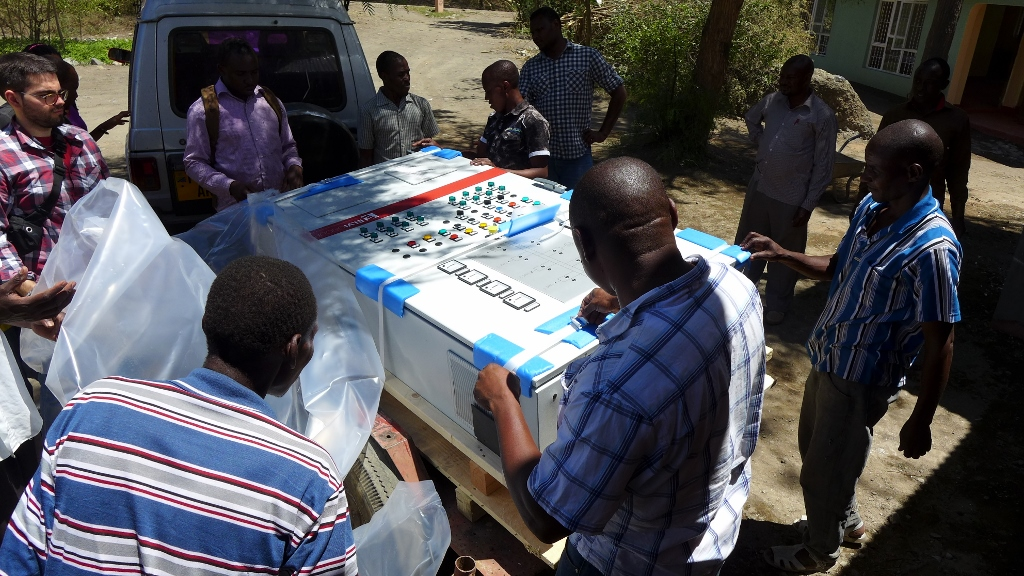
Solar project in Tanzania

=== Climate Fund ===
For each MWh of EKOenergy sold, a contribution of 0.10€ goes to EKOenergy's Climate Fund. This money is used to finance renewable energy projects that would not have happened without the contributions. These projects are managed by experienced organisations. All projects are selected in an open process, with sellers, buyers and independent experts actively involved.

Examples of funded projects include:

- Solar power for off-grid villages in Pakistan
- Solar power for a health post in Nepal
- Solar-powered sewing machines for 40 seamstresses in Cameroon.

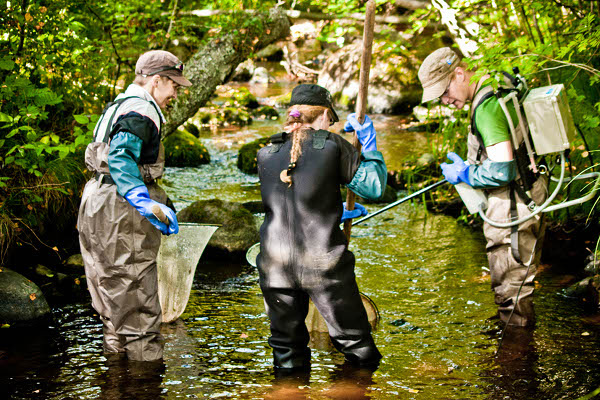
River restorations

=== EKOenergy's Environmental Fund and nature conservation ===
Whenever hydropower is sold with the EKOenergy label, €0.10/ MWh go to the Environmental Fund, to finance river restoration projects. Examples of earlier funded projects:

- Murronjoki river restoration (Finland)
- Norina river restoration (Latvia)

== EKOenergy mentioned by other environmental standards ==
=== LEED ===
The LEED Standard explicitly recommends the use of EKOenergy labelled electricity. Buildings aiming at LEED certification can get extra points if the electricity used in that building is EKOenergy certified. The text “LEED 2009 BD+C Supplemental Reference Guide with Alternative Compliance Paths for Europe” gives EKOenergy the same status as Green-e certified RECs in the US. They write: "The EKOenergy electricity certification scheme represents the best available pan-European option for the sustainable and additional consumption of renewable electricity within Europe. EKOenergy certifies renewable electricity that goes beyond the regulations of European directives and national governments of Europe."

=== Greenhouse Gas Protocol ===
The Greenhouse Gas Protocol is a worldwide standard for carbon accounting. It is a joint product of the World Resources Institute and the World Business Council for Sustainable Development. In January 2015, the Secretariat of the Greenhouse Gas Protocol published the Scope 2 Guidance, which gave advice about carbon accounting. The Guidance refers to EKOenergy several times. Chapter 11, which encourages companies to go one step further, refers to EKOenergy’s Climate Fund.

=== Nordic Ecolabel ===
The Nordic swan covers 59 product groups, including more than 200 product types.

Several of criteria give extra points for the use of EKOenergy-labelled electricity, such as the criteria for Printing Companies and Printed Matter and the criteria for Food Services and Conference Facilities.

=== UN Report 2024 ===
The EKOenergy brand is mentioned in the United Nations Environment Programme's (UNEP), where the importance of concrete tools, such as environmental certifications, is emphasised to ensure that the expansion of renewable energy takes place without compromising natural ecosystems or exacerbating social inequalities.

EKOenergy's work is considered in line with international standards for sustainability, contributing in particular to the achievement of the targets on clean and affordable energy (SDG 7) and climate action (SDG 13).
