= Environmental Choice Program =

The mark seen on "Environmental Choice" approved products.

The Environmental Choice Program is an ecolabelling scheme that was established by Environment Canada in 1988 with over 300 categories of products to help consumers identify services/products which are less harmful to the environment.

The "Environmental Choice" EcoLogo symbol of certification is three intertwined doves within a green colored maple leaf.

In July 2013, there were more than 7,000 EcoLogo certified products from more than 300 different companies and brand names and 122 Ecologo standards categories under which products can be certified.

Founded in 1988, EcoLogo provides customers – public, corporate and consumer – with assurance that the products and services bearing the logo meet stringent environmental standards that have been verified by a third party auditor.

It was founded by the Canadian government, but is now well-known world-wide.

== See also ==
- Global Ecolabelling Network
- Green brands
