= Ecolabel =

Labeling systems for food and consumer products

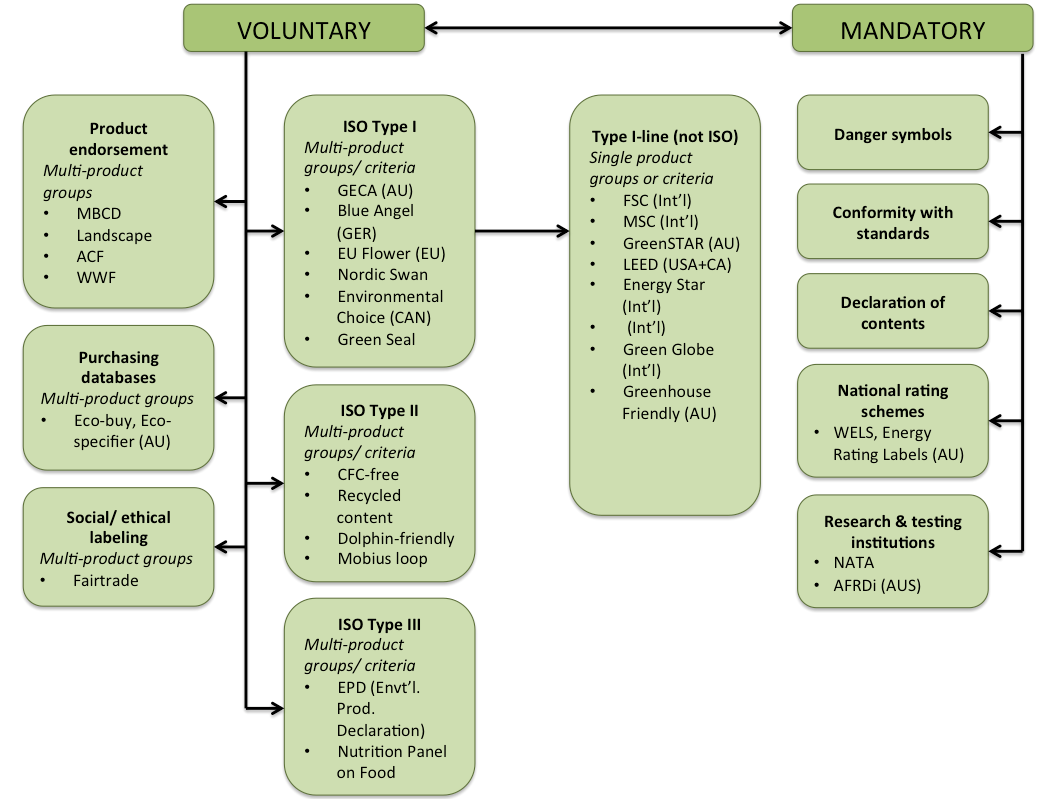
Classification of eco-labels

Ecolabels (also "eco-Labels") and Green Stickers are labeling systems for food and consumer products. The use of ecolabels is voluntary, whereas green stickers are mandated by law; for example, in North America major appliances and automobiles use Energy Star. There are currently 456 eco-labels in 199 countries, across 25 industry sectors according Ecolabel Index, the largest global directory of eco-labels. They are a form of sustainability measurement directed at consumers, intended to make it easy to take environmental concerns into account when shopping. Some labels quantify pollution or energy consumption by way of index scores or units of measurement, while others assert compliance with a set of practices or minimum requirements for sustainability or reduction of harm to the environment. Many ecolabels are focused on minimising the negative ecological impacts of primary production or resource extraction in a given sector or commodity through a set of good practices that are captured in a sustainability standard. Through a verification process, usually referred to as "certification", a farm, forest, fishery, or mine can show that it complies with a standard and earn the right to sell its products as certified through the supply chain, often resulting in a consumer-facing ecolabel.

The last few years have seen two key trends in the ecolabels space. There is an explosion in the numbers of different ecolabelling programs across the world and across business sectors and secondly the proliferation of umbrella labeling programs. Currently, there are around 264 active sustainability standards (according to ITC Standards Map) in 194 countries and 15 sectors, and about 457 ecolabels (according to Ecolabel Index) in 199 countries, and 25 industry sectors. Within the standard profile, ITC provide the typology which explains if it is an international standard or a private standard e.g. the entity in charge is a private association or company.

Ecolabelling systems exist for both food and consumer products. Both systems were started by non-governmental organizations (NGOs). Since then the European Union has developed legislation for conduct of ecolabelling and also have created their own EU ecolabels, one for food and one for consumer products. At least for food, the ecolabel is nearly identical with the common NGO definition of the rules for ecolabelling.

Label trust is an issue for consumers because some manufacturers and manufacturing associations have set up "rubber stamp" labels to greenwash their products with fake ecolabels. High trust levels can be created when ecolabels apply for governmental recognition as formal Certification Marks (recognized by logos or names with 'CTM', CM or 'CertTM'). Typically this means schemes approved as a Certification Mark have had the government department responsible declare that the scheme has a standard and certifies that they are 'Competent to Certify'. The highest trust levels would be a government recognized certification mark that was also compliant with key ISO standards, especially ISO 14024- Type I Ecolabels that undertake ISO 14040 compliant life cycle analysis as part of their assessment. Type I ecolabels are voluntary labels that signify overall environmental preference of a product or services based on life-cycle considerations that address multiple environmental criteria, which are based on transparent standards for environmental preferability, verified by a qualified organization.

== ISO participation ==
Recent years have seen two key trends with ecolabels. There is an explosion in the number of different ecolabelling programs across the world and across business sectors and secondly a proliferation of umbrella labeling programs. The International Organization for Standardization (ISO) has created standards for labeling practices within the ISO 14000 schema. ISO 14020 to 14025 series deals with environmental labels and declarations. ISO proposed three categories of environmental labels according to the aspects covered and the rigor required to award the seal: type I in ISO 14024; type II in ISO 14021; and type III in ISO 14025.

Type I (ISO 14024) is a voluntary multi-criteria ecolabel program assessed by an independent third party who considers the life cycle impacts of a product. Awarded certification authorizes the use of environmental labels on products and indicates overall environmental preferability of a product within a product category. The awarding body may be either a governmental organization or a private non-commercial entity. (e.g. EU Ecolabel, Nordic swan and German Blue Angel)

Type II (ISO 14021) is a self-declared claim made by manufacturers or retailers without third-party auditing. Developed internally by companies claims can take the form of a declaration, a logo, or a commercial.

Type III (ISO/TR 14025) an environmental product declaration consisting of quantified product information on the life cycle impacts. Instead of assessing or weighting the environmental performance of a product this type of label only shows the objective data, facilitating product comparison among buyers.

Additionally, "Type I-like" environmental labels focus on just one environmental or social aspect; these labels have been launched by independent organizations. Type I-like or single issue labels can be based on a pass/fail criterion, for example setting a maximum level of energy consumption for electric appliances (like the Energy Star label) or guaranteeing responsible management of the world forests: the Forest Stewardship Council refers to its label as "type I-like". Other single issue labels assess the performance of the product over a range, for example water efficiency.

== Ecolabeling innovation cycle ==
There is a close relationship between the ecolabeling process and the eco-innovation because it promotes the emergence of new green products and it improves the organizations environmental management strategy. Moreover, ecolabeling process is a "cyclical eco-innovation process in which consumers, firms, governments and institutions interact. Its final purpose is to contribute to the development of sustainable and ecological ways of production and consumption. In this process, consumers' environmental expectations are met; firms increase their created and captured value and enhance their sustainability, and governments and institutions foster cleaner production and consumption. Finally, this process is tangible in the products through the awarding of ecolabels, which are visibly displayed on goods and services".

== Environmental governance ==
Consumer desires for sustainable consumption is driving the global marketplace with desire to regulate product production. The globalization of economies is shifting control of sustainability away from traditional command and control measures imposed by governments towards market governance which is a self-regulatory new environmental policy instrument, ecolabelling.

Eco-labeling standardization is a new form of regulation which is voluntary in nature but impose upon large companies market forces in order to harmonize production of goods and services with stronger ecological practices. Recently, it has turned into a new form of non-state authority at both national and international levels. This idea of entrepreneurial democracy based on the success and adoption of international standards, this includes the ISO 14000 standards on the management of environmental quality and the ISO 9000 standards on quality production control. Once an industry sector decides to get this certification, it has to provide evidence of documented proof of compliance required. In terms of ISO 14042 standard, it is obligatorily for all applicants to respect environmental legislation and related legislation; breaching of any laws may result in licensing suspension.

=== International Trade ===
The increasing use of ecolabels by governments, industry and non-governmental organizations has led to international trade issues over ecolabels acting as non-tariff trade barriers. In particular developed countries and industries have expressed concern regarding the variety of diverse national or regional labelling requirements. In order to qualify for an ecolabel exporters have to adjust to the production standards of different markets abroad which may entail significant cost, information and technical expertise. Labelling programs also tend to be based on domestic environmental priorities and technologies of the importing country, often lacking relevance in regard to the exporting country's environment and local conditions.

In 1995, after the introduction of the World Trade Organization (WTO), the possible impacts of voluntary product standards and labelling schemes were covered in the WTO Agreements. Several of the WTO Agreements contain rules applicable to eco-labels, including the General Agreement on Tariffs and Trade1994 (GATT 1994 or GATT), the General Agreement on Trade in Services (GATS), the Agreement on Technical Barriers to Trade (TBT), and the Agreement on the Application of Sanitary and Phytosanitary Measures (SPS).

=== Sustainable initiatives ===
During the UN Earth Summit Conference in 1992, an international consensus was generated to integrate environmental issues into manufacturing procedures. The idea was to manipulate consumption patterns in order to achieve sustainable development. The result of this is as follows.

- developed world: Eco-labels and green stickers have evolved to play a vital role. They provide a verifiable link between products and informed consumer wishes. This approach applies market pressure on industries to minimize their environmental impact; this is evidenced by the growth in the population of informed consumers. Marketing strategists are responding with Green Certifications and its abuse, greenwashing.
- developing world: First consumers became concerned about the quality, safety and environmental sustainability of food and supported demand for green foods, then focused on the environmental effects of agriculture and globalization of food production, which led to the exposure of globally controlled food regimes. Consumer advocate groups responded with a call for [Alternative Food Networks]. This gives a new dimension to consumer demands and corporate competitiveness. Australian Consumer Association CHOICE confronted corporate interests with their concerns about growing interests in green consumption, food production, use of pesticides, organic production, and genetic modification.

== History ==
Green Stickers on consumer goods have been evolving since the late 1970s, when the German Blue Angel (Der Blaue Engel) certification became the first ecolabel worldwide in 1978. The main drivers have been energy and fuel consumption. These stickers first started appearing on major appliances after government agencies in the United States and Canada legislated their requirement. Manufacturers are also required to meet minimum standards of energy use. The automobile industry in North America is required to meet a minimum emissions standard. This led to fuel efficiency labels being placed on new automobiles sold. The major appliance manufacturers were required to use standard testing practices and place clear labels on products. The International Organization for Standardization has developed international standards for addressing environmental labelling with the ISO 14000 family which grew out of ISO's commitment to support the objective of sustainable development discussed at the United Nations Conference on Environment and Development, in Rio de Janeiro, in 1992.

Green Labelling worldwide is moving beyond traditional country borders. Most of these initiatives are voluntary eco-labels, however, there is an initiative underway in North America to broaden the scope of Green Stickers to include other consumer goods. Although consumers tend to prefer ecolabeled products, recent research show that consumers do not fully understand ecolabels and do not fully trust ecolabels, especially when learning negative environmental consequences of production.

== International networks ==
=== Global Ecolabelling Network ===
Based on a networking concept drawn up in 1994, the Global Ecolabelling Network (GEN) is an international non-profit network of third party type I ecolabelling organizations focused on encouraging and promoting type I ecolabelling development worldwide. GEN has members representing more than 50 territories and countries, with a particular focus in Europe, Asia and the Americas. GEN's mission is to educate and encourage government, industry, and consumers to recognize the unique and important value of Type I ecolabelling. More specifically, GEN functions to foster cooperation and information exchange across members and ecolabelling programs, facilities access to information on ecolabelling standards, engages with international organizations to promote ecolabelling, and encourages demand for ecolabelling products through the promotion of sustainable public procurement. GEN supports its members in developing environmental leadership standards and criteria.

=== International Social and Environmental Accreditation and Labelling Alliance ===
Created in 2002, the International Social and Environmental Accreditation and Labelling Alliance (ISEAL) is a private organization harmonizing a body of sustainability standards setting organizations (SSOs), set up to advance and develop sustainability standards for products across the globe. Its membership is open to all multistakeholder sustainability standards and accreditation bodies that demonstrate their ability to meet the ISEAL Codes of Good Practice and accompanying requirements. Its members are primarily single attribute focused ecolabelling organizations and include the Forest Stewardship Alliance, the Marine Stewardship Council, Fair Trade International, the Rainforest Alliance, and the Alliance for Water Stewardship, among many others.

The goals of the ISEAL Alliance are to improve the impacts of private standards, define credibility for sustainability standards, increase the uptake of credible sustainability standards, and improve the effectiveness of private standards, including driving innovations in standards. ISEAL received criticism from Institute for Multi-Stakeholder Initiative Integrity, with a conclusion that private sector Multi-Stakeholder Initiatives (MSIs) adopt weak or narrow standards that better serve corporate interests than rights holder interests.

== Programs by region ==
Governments of many countries have environmental protection agencies. These agencies are mandated watchdogs of industry and regulate releasing chemical pollution into the environment. Some of them administer labelling standards; other set minimum requirements for manufacturers.

=== Canada ===
Ecolabels specific to Canada include Canada Organic, the SeaChoice ecolabel (awarded by Sustainable Seafood Canada), and the British Columbia Certified Organic label.

The Office of Energy Efficiency (OEE) run by the Department of Natural Resources Canada regulates both the automobile and appliance manufacturers. The EnerGuide label for vehicles is found on all new passenger cars, light-duty vans, pickup trucks and special purpose vehicles not exceeding a gross vehicle weight of 3855 kg (8500 lb). The label shows the city and highway fuel consumption ratings and an estimated annual fuel cost for that particular vehicle. Federal law in Canada, under Canada's Energy Efficiency Regulations, requires that the EnerGuide label is placed on all new electrical appliances manufactured in or imported into Canada and that the label indicates the amount of electricity used by that appliance. This information is determined by standardized test procedures. A third-party agency verifies that an appliance meets Canada's minimum energy performance levels.

=== United States ===
The Energy Star service mark is placed on energy-efficient products.

All major home appliances must meet the Appliance Standards Program set by the US Department of Energy (DOE) on cooperation with the US Federal Trade Commission. Manufacturers must use standard test procedures developed by DOE to prove the energy use and efficiency of their products. Test results are printed on yellow EnergyGuide label, which manufacturers are required to display on many appliances. This label estimates how much energy the appliance uses, compares the energy use of similar products, and lists approximate annual operating costs. Appliances that meet strict energy efficiency criteria set by the U.S. Environmental Protection Agency are eligible for the blue Energy Star label. The Energy Star label is also available on energy-efficient televisions, computers, audio visual equipment and electronics, office equipment, heating and cooling equipment, and many more products. Energy Star is also available on energy efficient homes and buildings in the United States. American automobile manufacturers are required to use certified U.S. Environmental Protection Agency fuel economy test results and cannot use any other fuel mileage results to advertise vehicle fuel efficiency. The state of California has green sticker license plates issued to OHVs is introducing green stickers for all new automobiles in 2009.

=== European Union ===
The EU Ecolabel was established in 1992 by the European Commission. It helps to identify products and services that have a reduced environmental impact throughout their life cycle. Recognized throughout Europe, it is a voluntary label promoting environmental excellence which can be trusted. It is the only pan-European Type I official ecolabel. The EU Ecolabel is awarded according to ecological criteria agreed on by experts, industry, consumer organizations and NGOs and verified by independent third parties. The implementation of the EU Ecolabel is set through the Regulation (EC) No 66/2010 of the European Parliament and of the Council. The European Commission published its proposal in March 2023 for a Directive on substantiation and communication of explicit environmental claims (Green Claims Directive). This proposed Directive requires mandatory accreditation of verifiers.

=== Northern Europe ===
The Nordic swan is the official ecolabel in Nordic countries. It uses a system of standards, applications for licenses, and independent verification. In the Netherlands, the private label EKO is granted to products with at least 95% organic agricultural content. In Wales, Groundwork Wales awards businesses their "Green Dragon" accreditation for their environmental management systems at levels ranging from 1 ("committment") to 5 ("continual improvement").

=== ASEAN ===
In Asia, ASEAN is moving towards adopting the ISO's TC 207 environmental management system. Anyone can contribute verifiable sources substantiating its adoption and implementation by member countries as this information is not easily accessible.

== Seafood ==
There are a plethora of sustainable seafood ecolabels. Many conservationists feel that the increasing number of labels is further confusing consumers in regard to what seafood is sustainable. As of 2010, ecolabels that can be found on seafood include Marine Stewardship Council, Friend of the Sea, KRAV (Sweden), Naturland (Germany), Thai Quality Shrimp, Global Aquaculture Alliance's Best Aquaculture Practices standard, Label Rouge (France), and the Aquaculture Stewardship Council (ASC) is in development. Seafood is also labeled "organic", but USDA standards for organic seafood are still in development.

There are a variety of dolphin safe labels, asserting that tuna is caught in a manner that does not harm dolphins. In May 2019 consumers brought class-action lawsuits against Bumble Bee Foods, Chicken of the Sea, and StarKist for falsely labeling their tuna cans as "dolphin-safe". The suit claimed that the companies were violating the 1990 Dolphin Protection Consumer Information Act by marketing their fishing practices as "dolphin-safe", even though they use drift nets or purse seine nets which are known to harm and kill dolphins and other marine life. The suit also argued that these companies did not adequately separate between tuna that was dolphin-safe and tuna that was not.

== Energy ==
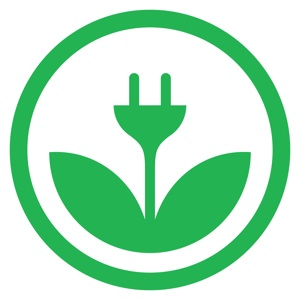
EKOenergy ecolabel for energy

Many consumer appliances have labels indicating whether or not they are energy efficient compared to similar products. Common labels include yellow EnergyGuide tags found in North America as part of the Energy Star program, European Union energy labels, and the Energy Saving Trust Recommended logo administrated by the Energy Saving Trust in the United Kingdom. These labels document how much energy an appliance consumes while being used; energy input labeling documents how much energy was used to manufacture the product, an additional consideration in the full life cycle energy use of product.

Carbon emission labels are an alternative methodology for certification, examining impact on greenhouse gas emissions rather than direct energy use.

== See also ==
- Anti-Waste and Circular Economy Law
- Cradle-to-cradle design
- Display Campaign
- EKOenergy
- Environmental audit
- Environmental certification
- Environmental Choice Program
- Environmental product declaration
- Fairtrade certification
- Forest Stewardship Council
- Green marketing
- Green Seal
- Greenguard Environmental Institute Certification Program
- Harmonization (standards)
- International Organization for Standardization
- LEED certification Leadership in Energy and Environmental Design
- Nutri-Score EU food nutrition label
- Standardization
- Sustainability standards and certification
- TCO Certified
- Technical Standard
- United Nations Forum on Sustainability Standards
