= XD engine =

LG HDTV picture and audio enhancement technology

XD engine is a technology used In LG HDTVs to enhance picture quality. In addition to providing standard features such as Deinterlacing and upscaling, it also provides three user selectable enhancements.

- XD Contrast

This feature attempts to increase the black levels and brightness of various aspects of the picture.

- XD Color

This alters and enhances color tones.

- XD Noise reduction

This provides analog and MPEG noise reduction.

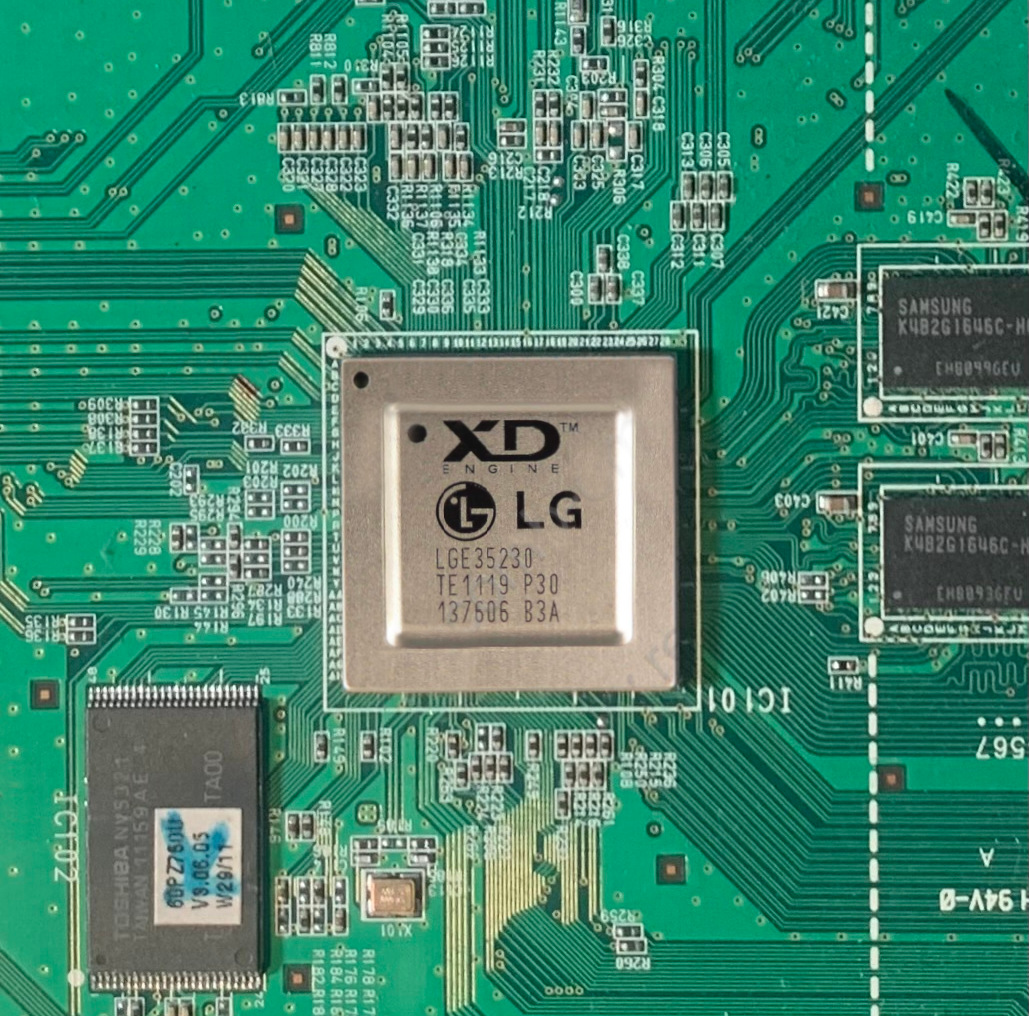
Photograph of a LG XD Engine Chip on a Television Motherboard
