= Global Ecolabelling Network =

Non-profit network

The Global Ecolabelling Network (GEN) is a non-profit network composed of some 29 ecolabel organisations throughout the world representing nearly 60 countries and territories, with two associate members and a growing number of affiliate members, one of which is Google. GEN members have certified over 252,000 products and services for environmental leadership. GEN was established in 1994.

The stated goal of the Network is to further the exchange of information between national ecolabel organisations that operate "Type I" ecolabels, the strongest category, as defined by ISO 14024. "Blauer Engel" (Blue Angel), the German ecolabel, established in 1978, was the first of this kind. Ecolabels are "licensed" for use only after a product or service is proven to meet transparent, published standards for environmental preferability, verified by a qualified, independent third party, and assessed over multiple environmental parameters (not just one single issue). The ecolabels are an assurance to consumers and procurement professionals that a product or service is proven "green" and has high environmental values and integrity.

The Global Ecolabelling Network, its members, their licensees, and the public celebrates World Ecolabel Day every year in October.

== Members ==
- Australia – Good Environmental Choice Australia (Environmental Choice Australia)
- Brazil – Associação Brasileira de Normas Técnicas (ABNT-Environmental Quality) [Brazilian National Standards Organization]
- China – China Environmental United Certification Center (China Environmental Labelling)
- China – China Quality Certification Centre (China Environmentally Friendly Certification)
- Chinese Taipei – Environment and Development Foundation (Green Mark)
- EU – European Commission (EU Ecolabel)
- Germany – German Federal Environmental Agency (Blue Angel)
- Germany – TÜV Rheinland (Green Product Mark)
- Hong Kong – Green Council (Green Label)
- India – Confederation of Indian Industry (GreenPro)
- Indonesia – Ministry of Environment (Indonesian Ecolabel)
- Israel – Standards Institution of Israel (Israeli Green Label)
- Japan – Japan Environment Association (Eco Mark Program)
- Kazakhstan – International Academy of Ecology of the Republic of Kazakhstan (ECO-Labelling Program)
- Korea – Korea Environmental Industry & Technology Institute (Korea Eco-Label)
- Malaysia – SIRIM QAS International Sdn Bhd (SIRIM Eco-Labelling Scheme)
- New Zealand – New Zealand Ecolabelling Trust (Environmental Choice New Zealand)
- Nordic Countries – Nordic Ecolabelling Board (Nordic Swan)
- North America (U.S.A and Canada) – UL (Ecologo)
- North America (U.S.A.) – (Green Seal)
- Philippines – Philippine Center for Environmental Protection and Sustainable Development (Green Choice Philippines)
- Russia – Ecological Union (Vitality Leaf)
- Singapore – Singapore Environment Council (Green Label Singapore)
- Sweden – Swedish Society for Nature Conservation (Good Environmental Choice)
- Sweden – TCO Development (TCO Certified)
- Thailand – Thailand Environment Institute (Green Label Thailand)
- Ukraine – All Ukrainian NGO Living Planet (Ecolabelling Program Ukraine)

== Associate Members ==
Organizations that formally support ecolabelling principals and goals.

- Vietnam – Vietnam Environment Administration (Vietnam Green Label)
- Colombia – Ministry of Environment & Sustainable Development (Sello Ambiental Colombiano) [Colombian Environmental Stamp]

== Affiliate Members ==
Ethical organizations that support ecolabelling and sustainable consumption.

- Google
- International Green Purchasing Network (IGPN)
- ISEAL Alliance
- Sustainable Purchasing Leadership Council (SPLC)

== See also ==
- International Federation of Organic Agriculture Movements
