= Energy Saving Trust Recommended =

British labelling and certification scheme for energy efficient products

Energy Saving Trust Recommended logo

The Energy Saving Trust Recommended logo was a UK-based labelling and certification scheme for energy efficient products. A product that displays the logo shows that it met strict criteria on energy saving. The scheme was run by the Energy Saving Trust and was launched in 2000. The logo is registered with the UK Patent Office and could be used by manufacturers, retailers and suppliers to signpost consumers to best-in-class energy efficient products.

The Energy Saving trust no longer awards a "Recommended" certification. Its product certifications now include "Energy Saving Trust Endorsed", "Energy Saving Trust Listed", and "Verified by Energy Saving Trust".

== How it works ==
The product criteria were created and managed by the Energy Saving Trust Recommended team, then peer-reviewed by an independent panel of industry experts. The criteria were reviewed annually to make sure they still represent only the most efficient products. Over 5% of products were tested every year to check they meet the criteria, the highest percentage of any UK certification scheme of this type.

== Where you can find the label ==
The Energy Saving Trust Recommended label can be found across 31 product types in 7 product sectors. These include:

- Home electronics - TVs, TV recorders, simple set top boxes, DAB radios, telephones and intelligent mains panels
- Home appliances - fridges and freezers, washing machines, tumble dryers, electric ovens, dishwashers and kettles
- IT - desktops, displays, laptops and printers
- Lighting - LEDs, halogens, CFLs and luminaires
- Heating - gas and oil boilers, heating controls, hot water cylinders and passive flue heat recovery devices/systems
- Glazing
- Insulation - pipe, cavity wall, external wall, dry lining and loft

== Members ==
Energy Saving Trust Recommended was a voluntary scheme which means all members put themselves and their products forward to be certified. As well as products meeting set standards on performance, all companies met the Energy Saving Trust's criteria in order to become a member. Over 250 large, medium and small companies were members of the scheme, including Hitachi Digital Media Group, Sony, Epson, John Lewis Partnership, Home Retail Group, Next, Samsung, Beko, Glen Dimplex, Baxi, Electrolux, Pure radios, Indesit, Knauf Insulation, Panasonic, Smeg and Aga Rangemaster.

== Funding ==
Up until 2010 Energy Saving Trust Recommended was entirely funded by the UK Government Department of Energy and Climate Change. From April 2010 onwards its aim was to become a self-funding scheme. As a result membership fees and product certification fees were introduced.
