= EU Ecolabel =

European Union labeling systems for products

EU Ecolabel or EU Flower is a voluntary ecolabel scheme established in 1992 by the European Union.

== Logo ==
The EU Ecolabel logo.

The label includes a green flower with inclined green "ϵ" (Greek epsilon) as the flower, surrounded by 12 blue stars. On EU Ecolabelled products, it must always be used together with the license number. Because of the logo, the label has a nickname EU Flower.

== Governance ==
The implementation of the EU Ecolabel is set through Regulation (EC) No 66/2010 of the European Parliament and of the Council. Its management is carried out by the European Commission and the national competent bodies. There is a competent body in each European Economic Area member state.

The EU Ecolabel is part of a broader EU Action Plan on Sustainable Consumption and Production and Sustainable Industrial Policy adopted by the European Commission on 16 July 2008, which also links the EU Ecolabel to other EU policies such as green public procurement (GPP) and Ecodesign of energy-using products.

== Criteria ==
EU Ecolabel meets the ISO 14020 Type I requirements for ecolabels. The EU Ecolabel criteria are developed and reviewed in cooperation of experts, industry, consumer organisations and environmental NGOs. EU Ecolabel criteria have been formulated for more than 30 non-food and non-medical product groups that are reviewed every 3–5 years. The label applications and licenses are managed by the national competent bodies.

In addition, the European Commission confirmed that EU Ecolabel criteria have been changed with a new set of ecological criteria for computers (personal, notebook and tablet computers), furniture and footwear, in order to promote the Europe's transition to a circular economy, supporting the sustainable production and consumption in the region.

In October 2021 the European Commission adopted new criteria for cosmetics and animal-care products. According to the new criteria, not only 'rinse-off' products like body wash, shampoo and conditioner can apply for the label, but all cosmetic products can. This includes oils, creams, skin-care lotions, sunscreens, deodorants and anti-perspirants, hairstyling and make-up products.

== Position in the market ==
In March 2016, there were 36,395 products that were awarded EU Ecolabel. The countries with most EU Ecolabel licences were France (26%), Italy (18%), and Germany (12%). EU Ecolabel has a strong position in most of the European countries and other ecolabelling schemes are triggered to take a position concerning the overlap with EU Ecolabel, for example Nordic ecolabel that in the Nordic countries is more popular than EU Ecolabel. In Germany, the Blue Angel is very common.

In a 2013 survey, Denmark was shown to be the top country in Europe where consumers recognise the EU Ecolabel and know what it stands for, with 35% of consumers recognising it visually and 17% of consumers knowing its meaning.

== Response and criticism ==
In early 1990s, the US, Canada and several other countries criticized the EU Ecolabel's product life-cycle analysis scheme, extra emphasis on usage of recycled materials by the products, and lack of transparency. EU Ecolabel had responded by adjustment of its assessment standards in 1996. Some decisions by EU Ecolabel, such as ban on imports of seal skins, furs caught using leg-hold traps, and Malaysian food, were criticized for their supportive nature of local European industry and allegedly unfairly putting foreign product makers at disadvantage. Similar trade barrier concerns were raised by US package goods industry in 1996.

The most recent revision of the label entered in force in February 2010. Some of the goals were to provide for a more rapid criteria development for specific product categories, to harmonise the EU Ecolabel with other ecolabels and to minimize the costs of the process, as well as to simplify the application procedure.

The European NGOs and consumer organizations see the EU Ecolabel as "a powerful instrument in encouraging environmental improvements in industry and in helping consumers make informed purchasing decisions".
