= Blue Angel (certification) =

Environmental label in Germany

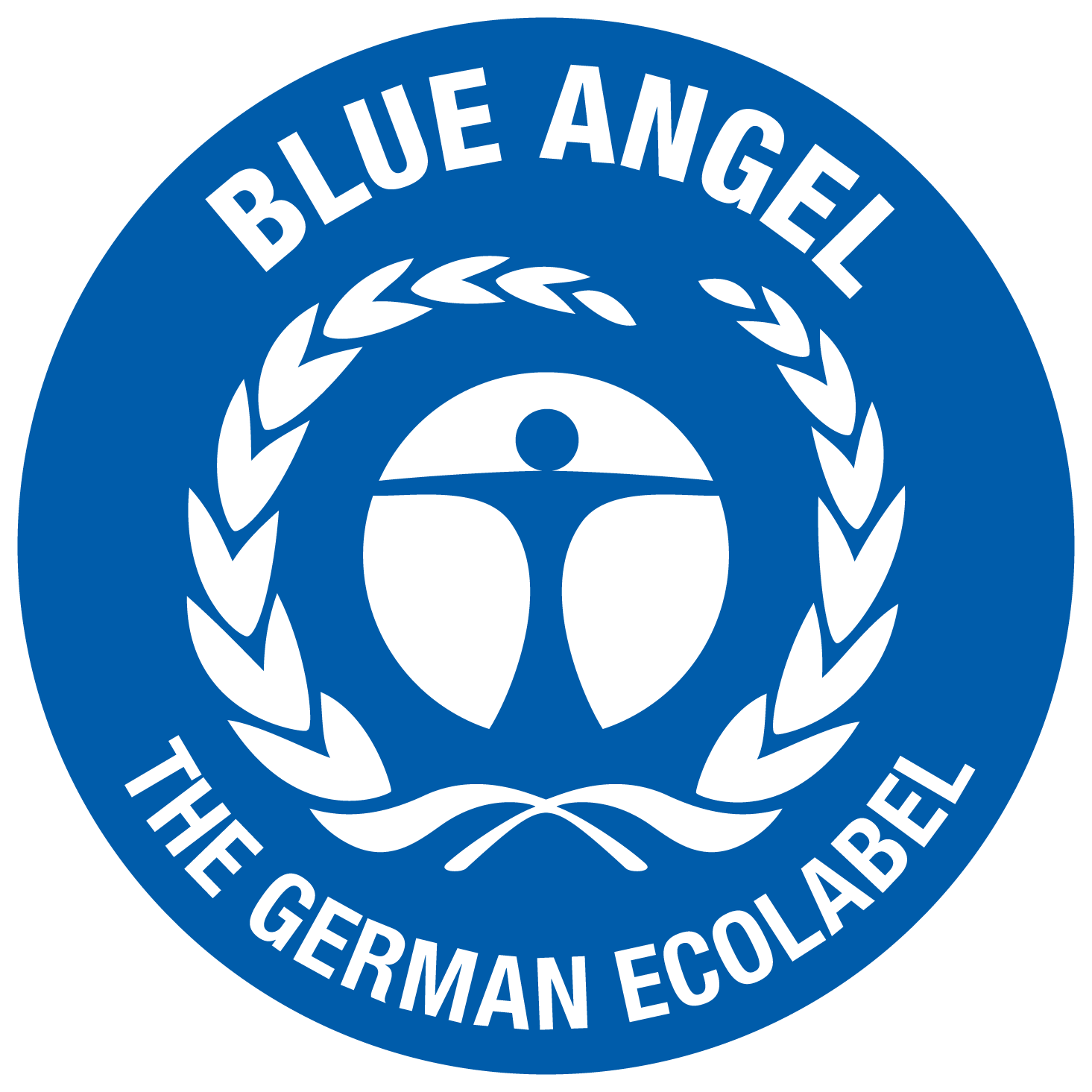
Logo of the Blue Angel since 2018 (English version)

The Blue Angel is an environmental label in Germany that has been awarded to particularly environmentally friendly products and services since 1978. The owner of the label is the Federal Ministry for the Environment, Nature Conservation, Building and Nuclear Safety.

== History ==
First logo (German version)

The Blue Angel is the ecolabel of the West German government and was introduced in 1978 by the Federal Minister of the Interior, which was a person of the Free Democratic Party (Germany) (FDP) in these years. This ministry was also responsible for environmental protection at the time, and the responsible ministers in the German federal states. It was established with the aim of highlighting more environmentally friendly and healthy developments and alternatives in areas where standard products have a negative impact on the environment. Suppliers can label their products and services with the environmental label on a voluntary basis and provide interested customers with guidance as a result. The Blue Angel is thus a market-based, voluntary tool of environmental policy.

The logo largely corresponds to the logo of the United Nations Environment Programme (UNEP), although with the colours reversed. The outer ring contains the words "BLUE ANGEL" and "THE GERMAN ECOLABEL". According to the official website, it reflects the aim of the German government to embed the UNEP goals in Germany. In 2018 a modified version of the logo was published.

The ecolabel can currently be awarded to around 100 product groups / services across the following sectors: paper products, building products, furnishing, clothing, washing and cleaning agents, cleaning services, (household) chemicals, packaging / disposal, vehicles / mobility, energy / heating, electrical devices (household), information and communication technology, other.

The ecolabel is only awarded to non-food products and not to food or beverages.

== Award process ==
The Blue Angel is a so-called "Type I environmental label" according to DIN EN ISO 14024. This means that the entire life cycle of the product is taken into account and any impacts on the environment and health are fully considered during the development of the criteria ("multi-criteria evaluation"). In addition, the criteria are developed in a transparent process that includes both the suppliers affected as well as interested organisations within civil society and research institutions. Last but not least, the certification process is carried out by an independent body. The Blue Angel is a member of the international network of Type I ecolabels – the Global Ecolabelling Network (GEN) – which currently comprises 29 ecolabels from various different nations.

The following institutions are involved in the award process for the Blue Angel:

- The Federal Ministry for the Environment, Nature Conservation and Nuclear Safety (BMU) is the owner of the label. It defines the fundamental guidelines for the award of the Blue Angel and appoints the members of the Environmental Label Jury. In addition, the ministry promotes the Blue Angel to the public, consumers and industry and also advocates greater consideration of the label in public procurement processes. .
- The Federal Environmental Agency (UBA) develops the specialist criteria that a product or service must comply with in order to be certified with the Blue Angel on a scientific basis and presents them to the hearings for the affected stakeholders (expert hearings). The Federal Environmental Agency regularly examines the criteria to ensure that the Blue Angel is always fully up to date with the latest technical developments. In addition, it also acts as the office of the Environmental Label Jury and thus supports its work. Furthermore, the UBA receives any proposals for new environmental labels from companies, private persons and organisations and, after checking and examining them, presents them to the Environmental Label Jury.
- The Environmental Label Jury is an independent and voluntary body. It decides which new product groups are added and discusses and approves the basic award criteria proposed by the UBA after the expert hearings. This decision-making body comprises 15 representatives from environmental and consumer associations, trade unions, industry, the trade, crafts, local authorities, academia, the media, churches, young people and the German federal states.
- RAL gGmbH (a non-profit GmbH ) is the awarding body for the environmental label. As an independent organisation, it checks compliance with the requirements after the submission of the product-specific application by a company and concludes contracts on the use of the Blue Angel with the companies.

== Praise and criticism ==
The Blue Angel is not a label that certifies that a product is completely harmless. The products labelled with the Blue Angel are more environmentally friendly and healthier than other products that have the same fitness for use and quality in the respective product group. Therefore, these products represent the "lesser evil" with respect to environmental pollution in line with the motto: as little as possible, as much as necessary.

Specific requirements are defined for each product group. This means that those criteria that are relevant for the respective product group / service are selected from a broad range of possible criteria. (For example, the criterion "noise" is relevant for municipal vehicles but not for laundry detergents, while the opposite is true when it comes to the biodegradability of the ingredients.) The criteria and methods used to verify compliance with them are continually examined and updated. The aim is to define criteria in such a way that the best products on the market are able to fulfil them and companies within the sector are thus encouraged to further develop their products.

The following aspects are analysed during the development of the criteria:

- Resource-conserving production (water, energy, (recycled) materials)
- Sustainable production of raw materials
- Avoidance of pollutants in products
- Reduced emissions of harmful substances into the soil, air, water and indoor spaces
- Reduction of noise and electromagnetic radiation
- Efficient use and products that use a low level of energy or water
- Durability, repairability and recyclability
- Good fitness for use
- Observance of international standards for occupational safety
- Return systems and services that enable the common use of products such as car sharing

All of the criteria for the award of the environmental label to the individual product groups are published on the Blue Angel website in a transparent way. The website also includes information on the certified products, the suppliers offering them for sale and other background information such as scientific studies and consumer information brochures. The independent certification body – RAL gGmbH – ensures that the certified products and services comply with the relevant criteria. The Blue Angel is not a seal of quality for the entire product, but rather only for those characteristics of a product that has a clear impact on environmental and health protection. Nevertheless, the Blue Angel serves its function as a guide for consumers because it has quickly become a generally accepted standard on the market for environmental protection in many sectors.

Environmental characteristics that are not stated in the basic award criteria are not tested.

It is also possible that there are products available on the market that meet the criteria but are not labelled with the Blue Angel because it is only awarded by application.

The label only compares products with the same intended use (e.g. paper products made out of recycled fibres and virgin fibres, mechanical and chemical drain cleaners, etc.). In contrast, a comparison of bicycles with motor vehicles would be like "comparing apples with oranges" because they are two completely different products that cannot be directly compared due to their different characteristics and performance specifications.

The Blue Angel does not state which product amongst two certified products is the most environmentally friendly.

In general, the products must avoid the use of terms such as "Bio", "Eco" or "Natural" in the product names if these products are also labelled with the Blue Angel. According to the criteria for the award of the Blue Angel, these advertising claims could be easily misleading to consumers, especially in the case of chemical products. This also applies to claims that play down the risks such as "non-toxic" or "non-harmful to health".
