= Nordic swan =

Ecolabel in Nordic countries

The Nordic swan mark

Whiteboard marker bearing the Nordic Swan Ecolabel, circa 2025.

The Nordic Ecolabel or Nordic swan is the official sustainability ecolabel for products from the Nordic countries. It was introduced by the Nordic Council of Ministers in 1989. The logo is based on the logo of the Nordic Council adopted in 1984 which symbolises trust, integrity and freedom. The Nordic Swan covers 67 different product groups, from hand soap to furniture to hotels.

The Nordic Swan is a voluntary license system in which the applicant agrees to follow criteria set outlined by the Nordic Ecolabelling. These criteria include environmental, quality and health arguments. The criteria levels promote products and services belonging to the most environmentally sound and take into account factors such as free trade and proportionality (cost vs. benefits).

Companies using the Nordic Swan label for their products must verify compliance, using samples from independent laboratories, certificates and control visits. The label is usually valid for three years, after which the criteria are revised and the company must reapply for a license.

The Nordic Ecolabel first appeared in the United States through a small offering of Nordic products. KCK Industries and ABENA introduced Bambo Nature, an environmentally friendly baby diaper. The success of this offering has led to the expansion of the Nordic Swan in the U.S.

Norway and Sweden implemented the Nordic swan in 1989, Finland in 1990, Iceland in 1991 and Denmark in 1998.
