= FINE =

Acronym for fair trade networks

FINE is an informal association of the four main fair trade networks: Fairtrade Labelling Organizations International (FLO), International Fair Trade Association (now the World Fair Trade Organization, WFTO), Network of European Worldshops (NEWS!) and European Fair Trade Association (EFTA) that was created in 1998. The name FINE is an acronym consisting of the first letter of the name of each of the four member organizations.

== Aims and goals ==
The aim of FINE is to enable these networks and their members to cooperate on:

- the development of harmonized core standards and guidelines for fair trade,
- harmonization, and increase in the quality and efficiency of fair trade monitoring systems,
- advocacy and campaigning work, harmonization of their information and communication systems.

FINE is an informal working group. It has no formal structure and no decision-making power. Meetings are held as required. Preparation, hosting and facilitation of the meetings rotates between members. Decisions are taken by the boards of the FINE members.

Since April 2004 FINE has run a fair trade advocacy office in Brussels. Its role is to coordinate the advocacy activities of fair trade proponents at both the European and the international levels. The aim of the office is to step up public support for fair trade and to speak out for trade justice.

== Definition of fair trade ==
In 2001, FINE members agreed the following definition of fair trade, on which to base their work:

"Fair trade is a trading partnership, based on dialogue, transparency and respect, that seeks greater equity in international trade. It contributes to sustainable development by offering better trading conditions to, and securing the rights of, marginalized producers and workers – especially in the South. Fair trade organizations, backed by consumers, are engaged actively in supporting producers, awareness raising and in campaigning for changes in the rules and practice of conventional international trade."

FINE members further agreed to define fair trade's strategic intent as:

- deliberately to work with marginalised producers and workers in order to help them move from a position of vulnerability to security and economic self-sufficiency,
- to empower producers and workers as stakeholders in their own organisations,
- actively to play a wider role in the global arena to achieve greater equity in international trade.

== FINE publications ==
- FINE. (2005) Fair Trade in Europe 2005: Facts and Figures on Fair Trade in 25 European countries. Brussels: Fair Trade Advocacy Office
- FINE (2006). Business Unusual. Brussels: Fair Trade Advocacy Office
