= Pura Vida =

Pura Vida, meaning "pure life" in Spanish, may refer to the following:

- A phrase encapsulating the culture of Costa Rica
- Pura Vida (film), a 1956 Mexican film that popularized the phrase
- Pura Vida (album), a 2006 album from the band Hamlet
- Pura Vida Bracelets, company that sells bracelets from Costa Rica
- Pura Vida Coffee, company that sells coffee from Africa and Latin America
- Pura Vida Conspiracy, a 2013 album from the band Gogol Bordello
- Pura Vida, original name of the band Carrie
