= Global Goods Partners =

- Formation: 2005
- Founders: Joan Shifrin; Catherine Shimony
- Type: Non-profit
- Headquarters: New York, USA
- Products: Handmade and artisanal clothes and accessories
- Website: globalgoodspartners.org

Global Goods Partners (GGP) is a fair-trade nonprofit organization which provides support and international market access to women-led cooperatives around the world.

== History ==
Global Goods Partners was cofounded in 2005 by Joan Shifrin and Catherine Shimony.

By 2008, GGP was selling handmade bracelets made by Argentinian native tribes, traditional Cambodian silk scarves, and Tanzanian handcrafted beaded bangles. In Venezuela and Colombia, GGP suggested artisan women to use a new crochet technique to make fashionable Kippahs.

In 2012, GGP launched the Fair Tuesday, an early December shopping day suggesting to avoid Black Friday and shop ethical instead.

In March 2013, Walmart announced the distribution of products handmade by native women around the world, in partnership with GGP.

== Activities ==
The organization sells handmade jewelry and accessories, along with home, kids and holiday decorations on its online marketplace.

GGP works with over 60 cooperatives in 23 countries across Asia, Africa and the Americas. Its partnerships range from Syria to Mexico, Nepal to Afghanistan. Its headquarters are in New York City.

GGP is a member of the Fair Trade Federation and Green America.

At the department store Macy's, all the products of the Gifts for Hope catalog are sourced from Global Goods Partners (ex: Heart of Haiti collection).
