= Fair-trade bananas =

Marketing initiative to aid farmers

Fair-trade bananas was a marketing initiative which focused on increasing the wages of agricultural workers and the price paid to small banana growers. This is not a commercial brand, but a marketing strategy. Fair trade is based on higher prices paid by consumers that allow an equitable distribution of gains from trade over the chain partners.

There are many of organizations involved in producing fair-trade bananas; for example, an organization called Banafair began importing uncertified/unlabeled fair-trade bananas into Germany in the mid-1980s (from 500 to 1,000 tonnes annually). In 1997, Fair Trade Labeling Organizations International (FLO) was established in Bonn, Germany to consolidate various labeling initiatives and establish worldwide standards for fair-trade bananas. The first fair-trade–labelled bananas imported to Germany were by TransFair in April 1998.

Fair Trade Labeling Organizations International, (now renamed Fair Trade International), is a large importer whose bananas bear the International Fairtrade Certification Mark. FLO-CERT is the international body that inspects the farms to ensure they meet the proper social and environmental according to Fair Trade International standards.

== Environmental impacts ==
The agricultural production of bananas on a large scale often uses more pesticides (and fungicides, fertilizers) than any other fresh fruit commodity. Production of fair-trade bananas promotes sustainable farming practices, but these result in a higher supermarket price which some consumers are willing to pay for ethical reasons.

== Research and discussion ==
Because the banana trade is a large world-wide business, a number of studies have been carried out on various aspects of the fair-trade–banana market, including political ecology, tariffs and quotas, price competition, organic growing, and retail price wars.

Fair-trade–certification programs have been criticized on several grounds. Griffiths has challenged the ethics of fair-trade labels in the fair-trade debate, and, in the Journal of Business Ethics, has pointed out instances in which negative research is not published and academics choose only successful coops or fair-trade organizations for study. In the Dominican Republic, Shreck found minimum pricing, and exclusivity of certification worsened socioeconomic disparity within farming communities, and limited access for non-certified farmers to the market. Furthermore, Shrek found that the standards of certification programs prioritized market interests over farmer rights and well-being. Frank has argued that fair-trade initiatives do not generally foster an empowering partnership between consumers and farmers.

== Foncho campaign ==
The Fairtrade Foundation campaign (2014–2016) used Foncho (full name Albeiro Alfonso "Foncho" Cantillo), a farmer from Cienaga, Colombia, and member of a Fairtrade-certified co-operative called Coobafiro, as the face for a year-long video campaign for schools, starting with a visit to the UK to appear at Fairtrade Fortnight.

== See also ==
- Fair trade
