= Ten Thousand Villages =

Nonprofit fair trade organization

- Type: Non-profit organization
- Founded: 1946; 80 years ago
- Founder: Edna Ruth Byler
- Headquarters: Akron, Pennsylvania, U.S.
- Key people: Dan Alonso, CEO, Cathi Linch, Chair of the Board
- Products: Home Décor, Jewelry, Personal Accessories, Tabletop, Plant and Garden, Baskets, Personal Care, Global Treasures, Stationery, Games, Musical Instruments, Nativities, and Festive Decor
- Revenue: Unknown
- Net income: N/A
- Website: tenthousandvillages.com

Ten Thousand Villages is a nonprofit fair trade organization that imports and sells handcrafted products made by artisans in over 12 countries to the US market. It was an early participant in the fair trade movement. It is a founding member of the World Fair Trade Organization (WFTO) and a certified member of the Fair Trade Federation (FTF).

== History ==
Logo of SELFHELP Crafts of the World, later to become Ten Thousand Villages.

Edna Byler founded the organization in 1946 following a trip to Puerto Rico. With support from the Mennonite Central Committee (MCC), she began selling handcrafted products from her car. By 1958, the operation had expanded into a storefront called Self Help Crafts. The organization was created to provide a market for artisan products as a way to generate income for people in developing countries. Its early philosophy reflected Mennonite values such as compassion, service, mutual aid, and peacemaking.

In the 1970s, the project moved out of Byler's basement and became SELFHELP Crafts of the World, an official MCC program. In 1994, the company became a member of the FTF. In 1996, the name was changed to Ten Thousand Villages, inspired by a quote attributed to Mahatma Gandhi: “India is not to be found in its few cities, but in the 700,000 villages.”

From 2006 to 2007, the company increased its purchases from artisans by more than US$1 million. In 2007, Ten Thousand Villages redesigned its stores to focus on reducing environmental impact and supporting its stated "triple bottom line" of economic, environmental, and social sustainability.By 2008, the company's sales surpassed US$25.5 million, with one-third paid directly to artisans and the other two-thirds covering importing, storage, marketing, retail costs, and administration.

In 2012, Ten Thousand Villages and the MCC entered into a partnership agreement. The organization is no longer owned by the MCC. In 2019, Gordon Zook became the company's CEO.

Ten Thousand Villages Canada closed corporate operations in June 2020, after which four stores remained open due to a licensing agreement, and a few others rebranded to continue operating independently. In May 2022, Dan Alonso was appointed as the new CEO.

In January 2025, the organization announced the closure of its 13 company-owned US retail locations. Ten Thousand Villages continues e-commerce retailing and wholesaling to its fair-trade affiliates.

== Artisan partners ==
Ten Thousand Villages works with artisans on employing environmentally sustainable production methods and using recycled or natural materials.

The organization establishes long-term trade relationships with groups representing artisans who lack access to traditional markets and produce goods suitable for North American retail. Most of these groups are located in Asia, Africa, Latin America, and the Middle East.

Artisans are paid 50% of the agreed-upon price up front to cover the cost of raw materials, with the remaining 50% paid upon product completion. This full payment is issued before the products are shipped to North America, regardless of whether the items are eventually sold.

Marketing Director Doug Dirks estimated that market prices abroad can be up to five times the amount paid to the artisan. He said that the company accepts the associated financial risks because it is important to their mission. Most artisans in these countries cannot obtain business loans from local banks.

== Operations ==
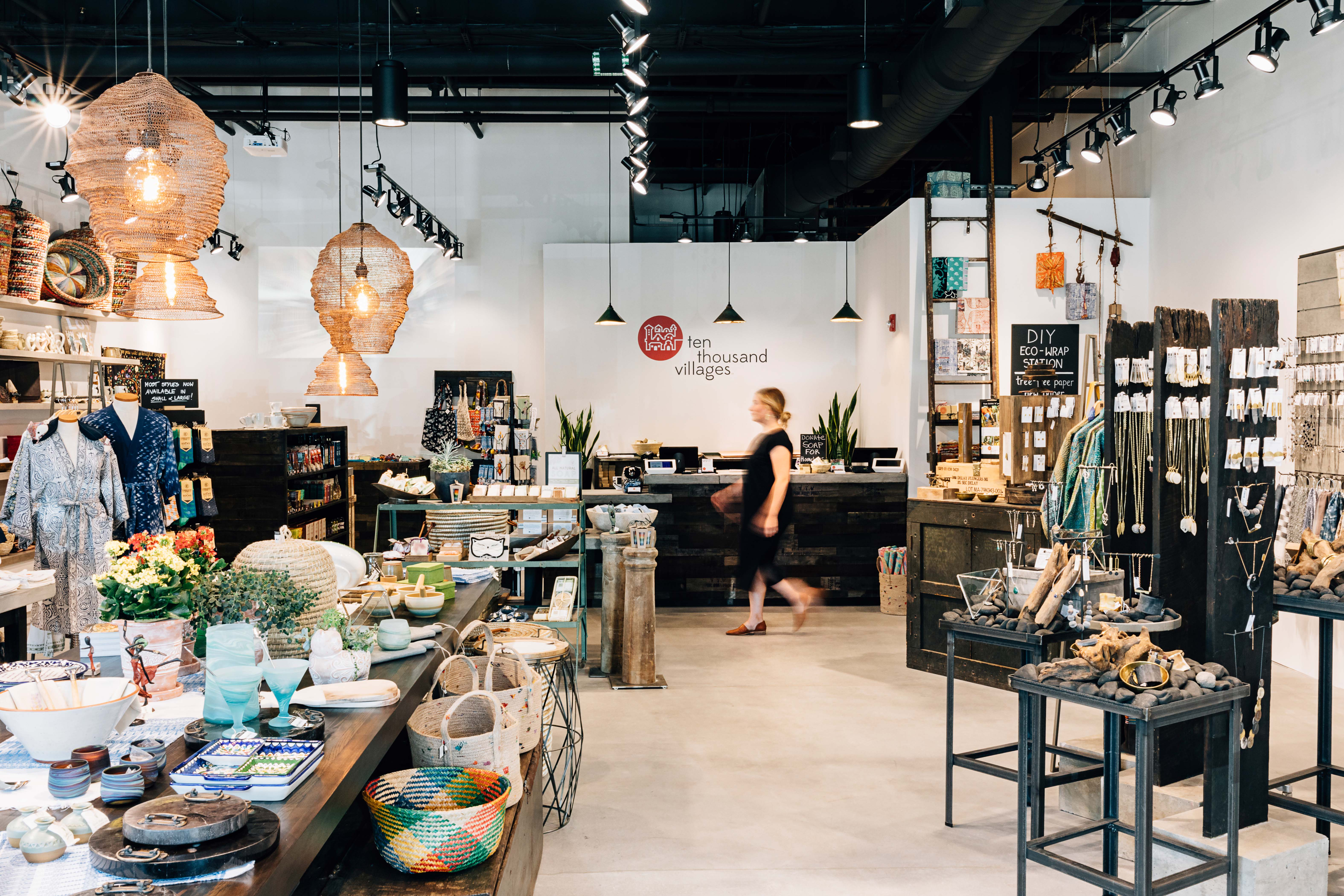
Ten Thousand Villages store in Bryn Mawr, Pennsylvania

The Ten Thousand Villages USA headquarters is located in Akron, Pennsylvania. The organization operates as both a wholesaler and online retailer, selling various home goods.

== Media ==
In 2005, Ten Thousand Villages released a DVD titled The Power of Trading Fairly, discussing with artisans from Bangladesh, Guatemala, and Kenya.

In 2006, the organization released Make Trade Fair, a compilation CD created to support Ten Thousand Villages.

== Impact ==
The organization states that its fair trade practices support tens of thousands of artisans worldwide. In 2009, the company conducted their “One Reason Why” campaign which showcased some of these anecdotal stories. The campaign revolved around printed and digital materials (such as bookmarks and DVDs) that presented artisans’ “one reason why” fair trade had made a difference in their lives. Some artisan groups or families have expanded into businesses that employ hundreds to thousands of people. However, little research has been conducted to determine the quantitative impact of Ten Thousand Villages and its worldwide fair trade partnerships.
