= Oliberté =

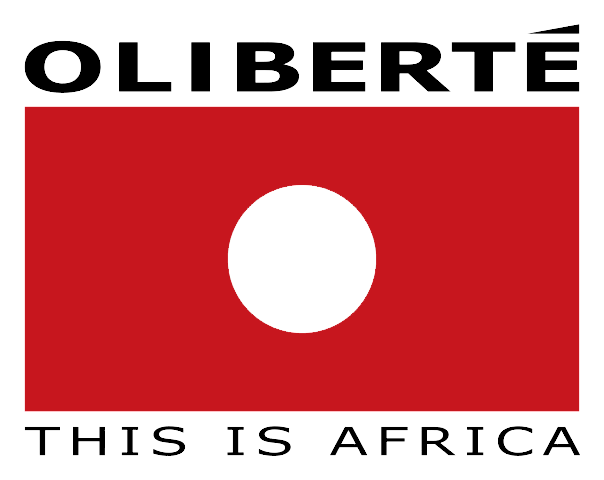
- Industry: Retail
- Founded: 2009
- Founders: Tal Dehtiar
- Headquarters: Oakville, Ontario, Canada
- Area served: Worldwide
- Key people: Tal Dehtiar (CEO / Founder)
- Products: Shoes, bags, accessories
- Website: oliberte.com

Oliberté is a Canadian shoe and bag brand that founded the world's first Fair Trade Certified factory, based in Addis Ababa, Ethiopia. They closed the African factory in 2019 and are now made in Canada.

== History ==
The company was created in 2009 as a small footwear company that partnered with various factories and suppliers in Africa, until they gained enough momentum to open their own factory in 2012. They make every single pair of Oliberté shoes at this factory in Addis Ababa, Ethiopia. In September 2013, they also became the world's first Fair Trade Certified footwear manufacturing factory. In March 2019 they announced the closing of their Ethiopian factory, shifting their manufacturing to Canada, sourcing hides from America and handcrafting using Vibram soles with a goodyear storm welting process. In September 2019 they released their first 'Made In Canada' boot.

== Philanthropy and community programs ==
In the past, for every pair of shoes sold, all workers in the factory would earn a percentage of the cost, and when a product leaves the factory, it is considered sold. This additional income was paid directly to a special workers’ account, enabling the workers to decide collectively how to spend it. Workers could also vote to take the Fair Trade premium dollars as a cash bonus, which is often equivalent to an entire month's salary or more.

Oliberté is a B Corporation certified company, which requires that a company achieves a minimum score for "social and environmental performance."

Oliberté is a part of the One Percent for the Planet program, which means that 1% of all proceeds are donated to green initiatives.

== Vertical Integration ==
Oliberté employs a vertical integration model in their production to ensure that rigorous quality and environmental standards are maintained, and that any involved businesses receive the full benefit from the social enterprise.

Goat and cow leather used by the factory comes directly from USA. It is certified free-range and hormone-free, and their previous tannery utilized the world's only chrome-recycling system.

Their all-natural rubber was sourced from live trees found in multiple African countries such as Liberia, South Africa, Kenya and Ethiopia, depending on availability. Now they use Vibram soles in all construction.
