= Maggie's Organics =

Clothing and toy company

- Industry: Clothing from Organic Fibers
- Founded: 1992
- Founder: Bena Burda
- Headquarters: Dexter, Michigan, USA
- Products: Apparel, Socks, Stuffed animals
- Website: maggiesorganics.com

Maggie's Organics is a brand of clothing and soft goods made from certified organic cotton and wool fibers, using fair trade production and distribution methods. The company was founded in 1992, and so is the oldest surviving organic apparel company in the US. The company's production is done in worker-owned co-operatives in Nicaragua and North Carolina, as well as in a family-owned and -operated facility in Costa Rica. Maggie's Organics also seeks to minimize packaging and product transportation in order to lower their carbon footprint.

== History ==
The idea for Maggie's Organics began with an organic tortilla chip. The founder worked in the organic food industry, selling both blue and yellow corn tortilla chips, when one of their farmers recommended adding cotton to the crop rotation to improve the quality of the corn. Organic farmers often use crop rotation as a way to improve crop yields without chemicals. His experiment worked. However, his cotton yielded a crop that then became the possession of the founders who had no venue to sell it.

They soon began producing clothing with this accidental organic cotton. They started with socks, and then added tee shirts, focusing on simple products that would encourage the use of organic fibers that would also convert as many acres of land as possible from conventional to organic farming methods. By 2008, founder Bena Burda was recognized as one of the 25 most influential people in the organic industry.

Conscious of poor working conditions in the apparel production industry, Maggie's became interested in finding or creating an alternative production method. By partnering with Jubilee House Community, a community development organization, they were instrumental in the creation of The Fair Trade Zone, a 100% worker-owned sewing co-operative in Nueva Vida, Nicaragua. The co-op has become the first worker-owned cooperative in the world to gain Free Trade Zone status and is an independent business sustaining its members and workers.
