= Network of European Worldshops =

The Network of European Worldshops (NEWS!) was a network of national associations of Worldshops representing 2,500 shops in 13 member countries: Austria, Belgium, Denmark, Finland, France, Germany, Ireland, Italy, Netherlands, Spain, Sweden, Switzerland, and the United Kingdom. It was established in 1994 and coordinated the cooperation between Worldshops in Europe. NEWS! ceased to exist in its original form in October 2008. It is currently part of the European chapter of the World Fair Trade Organization: WFTO-Europe.

NEWS! initiated and coordinated joint campaigns and awareness raising activities of the European Worldshops (such as the annual European Worldshops Day in May) and supported the professionalisation of national associations of Worldshops. The aim of NEWS! was the promotion of fair trade in general and the development of the Worldshops movement in particular.

Worldshops sell fair trade products and organize various educational exhibits, programmes and campaigns to promote fairer trade practices. Worldshops cooperate on local, regional, national, and international levels, supported by their National Associations.
