= BeGood Clothing =

American retailer

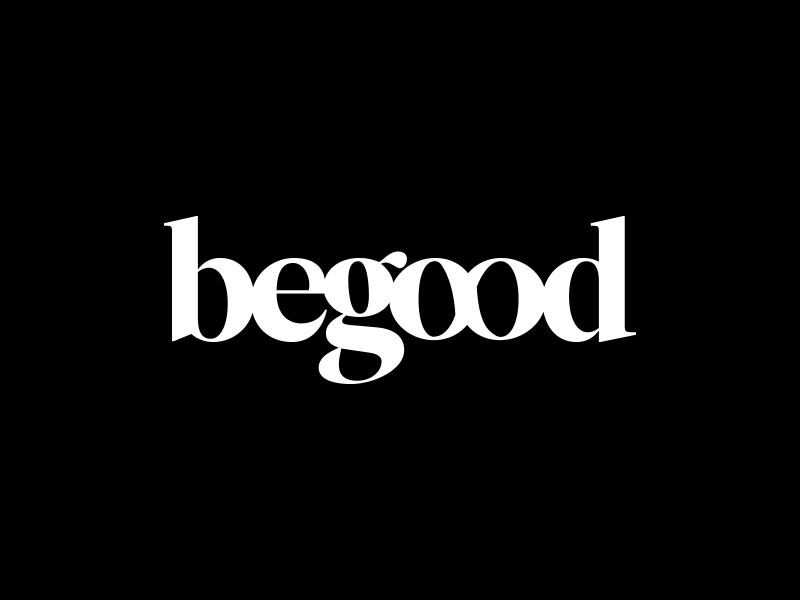
- Type: Private
- Industry: E-commerce, clothing
- Founded: August 2012; 13 years ago
- Founders: Mark Spera and Dean Ramadan
- Headquarters: San Francisco, California, United States
- Area served: USA
- Key people: Mark Spera (co-founder); Dean Ramadan (co-founder)
- Products: Clothing, women's clothing, men's clothing, dresses, shirts, blouses, jewelry
- Services: Online shopping, electronic commerce
- Website: begoodclothes.com

BeGood Clothing is a retailer of clothing and accessories, selling its products online and its business is focused on socially responsible clothing. The company is based in San Francisco, California. BeGood Clothing has stated that its social responsibility initiatives include the selling clothing and gifts described by the company as sustainable or eco-friendly, and making donations to environmental or humanitarian causes with items purchased. The company supports local San Francisco nonprofits, participates in charitable events, and donates customers’ gently used clothing to Goodwill Industries monthly.

BeGood Clothing was founded by Mark Spera and Dean Ramadan. Spera has been involved in ventures in industries such as business services and healthcare.

== Products ==
BeGood selects the brands and designers it carries, including brands described as sustainable or socially responsible image. The company offers various clothing items from designers who associate with charities or have implemented corporate social responsibility strategies. Its product categories include shoes, handbags, and dresses, among other products.

== BeGood Outreach ==
BeGood has partnered with the San Francisco non-profit, Project Open Hand, and donates a meal to their organization for the sale of certain items in the store. BeGood also partners with these local and global non-profits and charitable organizations:

- Project Open Hand
- Goodwill Industries
- Books for Africa
- Donation of clean water
- Education initiatives
- Toothbrush given to a child in need
- Donation of prescription lenses
- Eco-Causes
- World Bicycle Relief
- Humanitarian Initiatives
