= Boll & Branch =

American e-commerce company

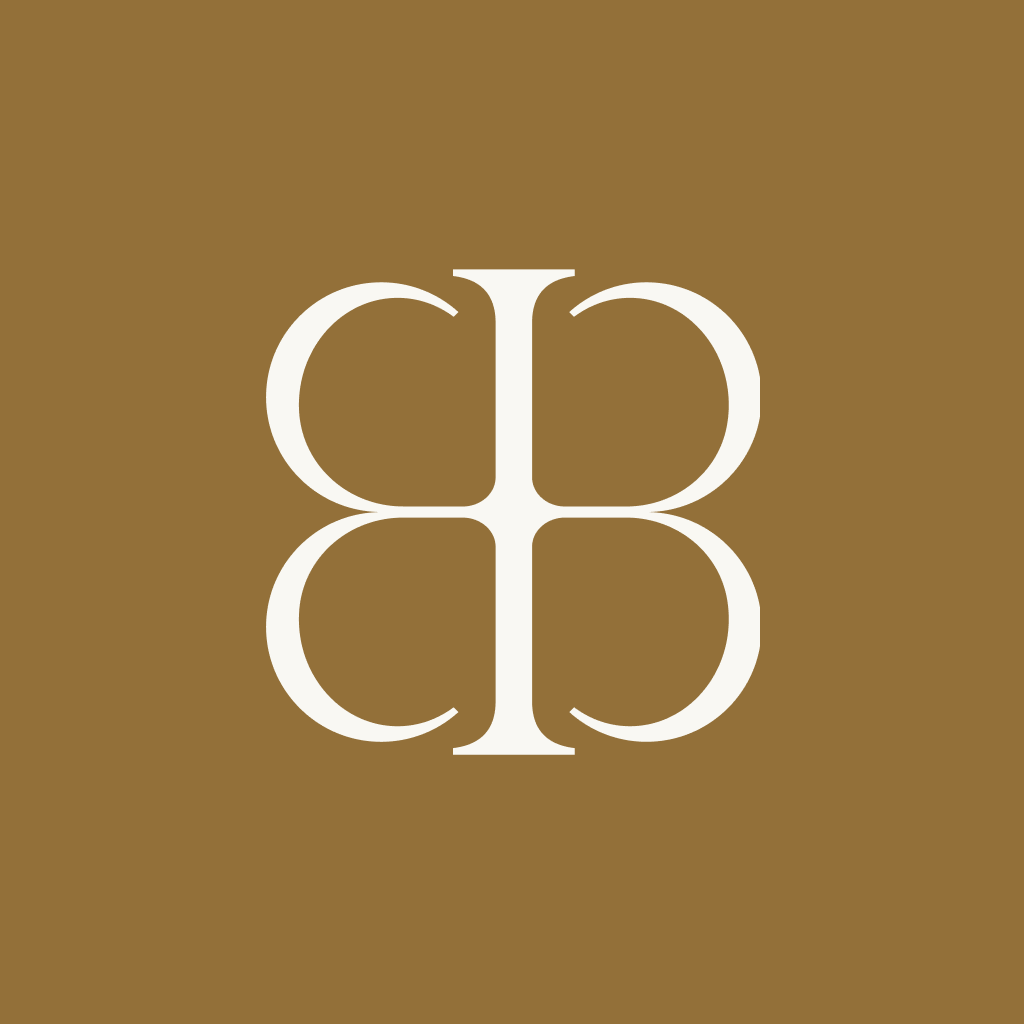
Boll & Branch Boll & Branch Logo
- Type: Private
- Industry: Bedding, Mattress
- Founded: 2013
- Founder: Scott Tannen, Missy Tannen
- Headquarters: Summit, New Jersey
- Area served: United States, Canada, United Kingdom, Australia
- Products: bed sheets, blankets, pillows, mattress, home decor, comforters, bedroom furniture
- Website: bollandbranch.com

Boll & Branch is a privately held, U.S. based, e-commerce company that manufactures and sells luxury bedding online. Headquartered in Summit, New Jersey, the company is the first luxury bedding manufacturer to be certified by Fair Trade USA.

Boll & Branch launched in January 2014 by a former third grade teacher, Missy Tannen and her husband, a former Wrigley and Kraft Foods exec, Scott Tannen, who self-funded the venture. Most of the company's products are manufactured in Kolkata, India with the cotton being grown by CHETNA Organic in Orissa, India.

The company's annual revenue is estimated to be in excess of $100 Million.

In August 2017, they announced the opening of its first brick & mortar retail location in The Mall at Short Hills in Short Hills, New Jersey In October 2019, Nordstrom announced that it will make Boll & Branch products available in 21 of their stores. This will be the first time the company's products are available through a third-party retailer. The company was among the first retailers to utilize Far-UVC 222 lighting to sanitize their stores in the Town Center at Boca Raton and in Greenwich, CT.

== Products ==
Boll & Branch has received notice for its ethical and sustainable manufacturing of luxury bed sheets. In August 2015, it launched a line of organic cotton bath towels and introduced a line of crib sheets and blankets for babies in October 2015.

In October 2016, the company launched a line of flannel bedding made in Guimaraes, Portugal. In June 2018, it introduced a line of ethically sourced Down pillows.

In October 2018, it expanded into the mattress industry. They promote their "luxury mattress" as not containing memory foam, but rather using wool, coils and organic cotton.

== Investments ==
Boll & Branch received $7 million Series A funding from Silas Capital in April 2016 and raised a $4 million Series B investment in October 2017 also from Silas Capital.

In August 2019, the company received a $100 Million investment from private-equity firm, L Catterton. With this investment, Founder Scott Tannen will continue in his role as CEO.

== Retail Expansion ==
As of 2026, Boll & Branch operates 19 retail stores. As of October 2026, Boll & Branch operates 19 retail stores. In addition to their original location in The Mall at Short Hills in Short Hills, New Jersey, the company operates stores in Greenwich Avenue Historic District, Dallas, Houston, The Grove at Shrewsbury, Westside Provisions, Marietta, Georgia, Mosaic District, SouthPark Mall (North Carolina), The Summit (Alabama), Galleria Edina, The Gardens Mall, Bethesda Row, Town Center at Boca Raton, Westfield Old Orchard, Somerset Collection, Suburban Square, The Street at Chestnut Hill, Massachusetts, and The Corners of Brookfield, Wisconsin. The company reports all locations to be profitable.
