= MUD Jeans =

Sustainable and fair trade certified denim brand based in The Netherlands

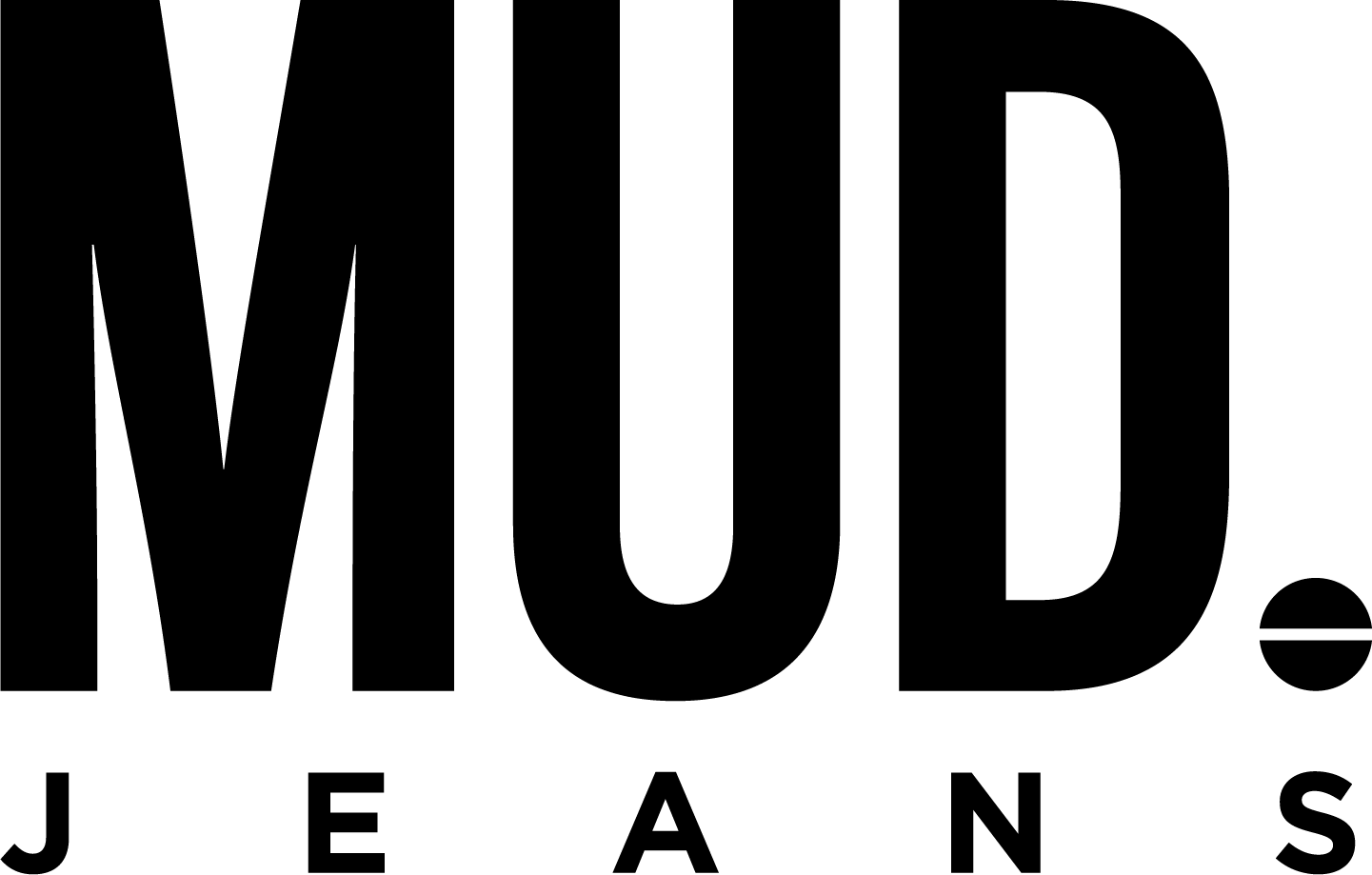
- Established: 2012
- Founder: Bert van Son
- Type: Private
- Headquarters: Amsterdam, The Netherlands
- Products: Denim apparel
- Website: mudjeans.com

MUD Jeans is a denim brand based in the Netherlands that specializes in sustainable denim products.

The company is a certified B-Corporation indicating they adhere to the principles of the circular economy. MUD Jeans utilizes up to 40% post-consumer recycled content in its jeans, with the material sourced from discarded denim. This discarded denim comes from MUD Jeans customers, who can send their old jeans to the brand for free. Another system used aside from regular purchasing, customers can also lease their jeans for a monthly fee, over a one-year period. After one year, customers can either keep their jeans, switch them for a new pair at a 10% monthly discount or return them for recycling or upcycling.

MUD Jeans uses specific production methods to reduce the environmental impact of the production of their jeans. Through reverse osmosis, their jeans manufacturing partner recycles 95% of the water used during production. Through the dry indigo method, their fabric manufacturing partner replaces traditional dyeing methods, which typically involves multiple dyeing baths, with a high pressure and dyeing foam application. To measure the exact environmental impact of their jeans, MUD Jeans carries out an annual Life-cycle assessment on each of their products. Through this, they communicate the water and CO_{2} impact of their products on their website. This concept, known as Lease A Jeans, was launched in 2013 and includes free repair services.

== History ==
The company was re-launched by Bert van Son after acquiring the brand in 2012. Bert van Son had a new vision for the company and decided to invest in MUD Jeans. From May 2016 to August 2018, MUD Jeans was headquartered in Almere, The Netherlands. In September 2018, the company relocated to Laren, Netherlands at the Groene Afslag.

In August 2026, MUD Jeans filed for bankruptcy.

== Lease A Jeans ==
The 'Lease A Jeans' concept was launched in 2013. With this concept, MUD Jeans follows a circular economy where the consumer moves from owing to using. The concept also promotes the return of the jeans, which will stimulate the recycling process.

The consumer can lease a pair of jeans for a period of one year. In the eleventh month of the consumer's lease contract, the consumer is given three choices concerning the jeans:

1. Switch the current jeans for another pair and continue leasing the new pair of jeans at a 10% monthly discount. The old pair will be recycled or sold as vintage, depending on the condition of the jeans.
2. Return the jeans without receiving a new pair. The old pair will be recycled or sold as vintage, depending on the condition of the jeans.
3. Keep the jeans. After the 12 months of monthly payments, the consumer has paid off the amount of the jeans and are now the owner.

When old jeans are returned to the company, a quality check is carried out to determine whether they can be reused through the brand's vintage program or if they should be recycled. Once jeans are returned to be recycled, the jeans are sent back to the recycling factory Recover in Valencia, Spain, where the recycling process takes place. The denim fibers are reused in new jeans. Anyone can return (non-)MUD Jeans so that they can be recycled.

== The Road to 100 ==
MUD Jeans’ Road to 100 project, which began in 2019, aimed to create the world's first pair of jeans made from 100% post-consumer recycled cotton. To achieve this, they combined the typical textile recycling method of mechanical recycling with a newer method of chemical recycling. Through mechanical recycling, textiles are cut into smaller pieces and shredded, which makes the original cotton fibers shorter. Due to this, there is a limit to how much mechanically recycled fibers can be used in jeans without compromising durability. Through chemical recycling, cotton fibers can be significantly longer. By combining these two methods, MUD Jeans achieved their goal in early 2022 and shared a documentary series on the project. The project was carried out in collaboration with Saxion University of Applied Sciences and was funded by Tech for Future. The main contributor of mechanically recycled fibers was Recover.

== Recognitions ==
Among other awards, MUD Jeans was recognized with the Koning Willem I-prijs for sustainable entrepreneurship in 2022. This prize was awarded by Queen Máxima of the Netherlands, in the name of the Koning Willem I Stichting and De Nederlandsche Bank. MUD Jeans was also recognised as “Best for the World” in the environment category of the B Lab assessment. This means that, across all certified B Corporations, MUD Jeans’ environment score was among the global top 5%.

== Partnerships ==
=== Van Gogh Museum ===
In 2022, the brand partnered up with the Van Gogh Museum, based in Amsterdam, the Netherlands. Together they created a capsule collection, inspired by the artist Vincent van Gogh. The items have lasered details such as the handwriting and sentences from Van Gogh's letters and embroidered back prints of Van Gogh's art pieces Almond Blossom and Self-portrait with grey felt hat. The denim clothing pieces consist of 30% hemp, 20% post-consumer recycled denim and 50% organic cotton.
