= Chocolove =

US chocolate manufacturer

- Company type: Privately held company
- Industry: Confectionery production
- Founded: 1996
- Founder: Timothy Moley
- Headquarters: Boulder, Colorado, United States
- Products: Chocolates
- Website: www.chocolove.com

Chocolove is a chocolate manufacturer with headquarters and a manufacturing facility in Boulder, Colorado, founded in 1995 by entrepreneur Timothy Moley. The company produces all-natural and organic chocolate bars. Chocolove imports chocolate and cocoa butter from Belgium to produce its chocolate.
