= SERRV International =

American fair-trade organization

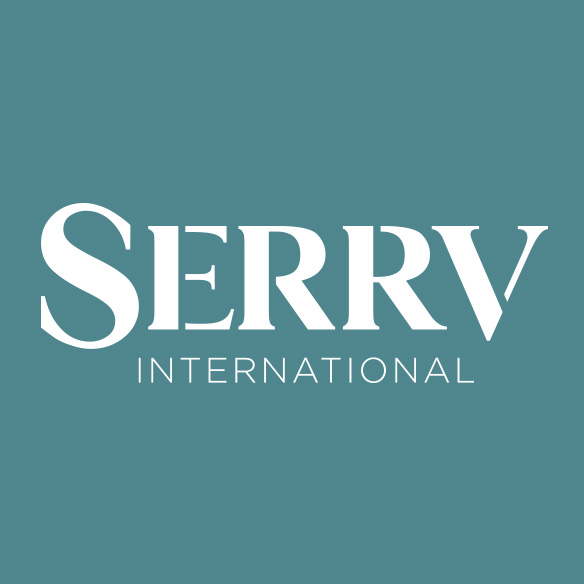
- Company type: Non-profit organization
- Founded: 1949; 77 years ago
- Headquarters: New Windsor, Maryland, United States
- Key people: Serena Sato, President/CEO
- Products: Handicrafts, coffee, chocolate
- Revenue: ▲$9.9 million USD (2023)
- Website: serrv.org

SERRV International is an American 501(c)(3) nonprofit, based in Madison, Wisconsin and operating in the United States, Africa, Asia and Latin America. It began operations in Europe in 1949, and has since expanded to thousands of artisans and farmers in 24 countries around the world, with artisans in 40 developing regions. In 2005 it had annual sales of over $8.5 million, now over $9 million.

== History ==
SERRV was established by the Church of the Brethren in 1949 as the Sales Exchange for Refugee Rehabilitation and Vocation, to help refugees in Europe recover economically and socially in the aftermath of World War II. The acronym SERRV was later changed to stand for "Sustainable Employment, Resources, Rights and a Vision of Hope".

== Philosophy ==
SERRV is an Alternative Trading Organization (ATO) and member of the Fair Trade Federation. Among ATOs, SERRV stands out for its use of alternative distribution channels, primarily partnerships with US churches and organizations like the Christian Children's Fund, Catholic Relief Services, and Lutheran World Relief.
