= Pura Vida Coffee =

Coffee company

- Type: For-profit company
- Industry: Coffee
- Founded: 1997
- Headquarters: Tukwila, Washington, United States
- Area served: International
- Products: Fair Trade Certified organic coffee
- Parent: Pura Vida Create Good
- Website: puravidacreategood.com

Pura Vida Coffee is a for-profit company wholly owned by Pura Vida Create Good, a nonprofit U.S. company. It sells Fair Trade Certified organic, shade-grown coffee from Latin America and Africa. The company advocates corporate social responsibility by donating its profits to help children and families in coffee-growing communities internationally.

Pura Vida Create Good, a 501(c)(3) nonprofit that serves as the philanthropic division of the company, is funded by coffee sales and corporate and private donations. Pura Vida Partners works with coffee co-ops and local charitable agencies to deliver community-driven projects promoting self-reliance in the areas of economic, health, and education.

Founded in 1997 and headquartered in Tukwila, Washington, Pura Vida also provides profit sharing opportunities for nonprofit organizations such as Sister Schools, FundaVida, and Ecofiltro.

In its early years, Pura Vida Coffee adopted an unconventional financing and ownership structure designed to protect its social mission while operating as a for-profit company. The company was established as a for-profit entity with all profits earmarked for its nonprofit parent organization, originally known as Pura Vida Partners, which became the owner of Pura Vida Coffee. To raise initial capital and remain eligible for grants, the nonprofit issued interest-bearing bonds that later converted into equity-linked warrants, while requiring investors to donate dividends to charitable causes.

As the company grew more rapidly than anticipated, debt servicing constrained cash flow, leading to a restructuring in which most investors converted debt into common stock and agreed to dilute their holdings in order to support long-term growth. The revised structure limited voting rights to mission-focused shareholders, a measure intended to safeguard the organization’s social objectives. Following recapitalization, Pura Vida Coffee was able to finance expansion through its operations and, by the late 2000s, was on track to achieve net profitability.

By the late 2000s, the company had generated approximately $2.7 million in cash and in-kind resources to support health and education programs for children and families in coffee-growing communities. The organization has been cited as an example of a "double bottom line" business model, combining commercial operations with explicit social and philanthropic goals.
