= World Fair Trade Organization =

International Trade Organisation

WFTO Fair Trade Organization Mark

The World Fair Trade Organization (WFTO) claims to be the global community and verifier of enterprises that fully practice fair trade. It is an association of small and medium sized enterprises (SMEs), farmers or retailers that claim to fully practice the 10 Principles of Fair Trade. They also state that they advocate for fundamental change in our current economic system. Members are primarily enterprises claiming to engage in fair trade, whose business model is verified by independent audit and peer review. Verification is at enterprise level, which covers all aspects of the business and supply chain. WFTO verification should not be confused with commodity certification systems, such as Fairtrade certification, where only a component of the product is covered. The WFTO product label can only be used by verified fair trade enterprises, which consist of producer cooperatives and associations, export marketing companies, importers, retailers, national and regional fair trade networks and Fair Trade Support Organizations. WFTO is democratically run on a one member one vote basis. WFTO was created in 1989 and was formerly the International Federation of Alternative Traders ("IFAT").

WFTO members use commercial activity to achieve a social mission and have been referred to as 'Fair Trade Social Enterprises'.

WFTO's stated mission is "to enable producers to improve their livelihoods and communities through Fair Trade". Their five goals are:

1. To be the leading network of the Fair Trade movement
2. To provide an environment for sharing and learning
3. To raise awareness of and promote the Fair Trade model, and advocate for change to conventional trade.
4. To create market access opportunities for members
5. To enhance WFTO's capability to deliver a broader range of services to its members

In 2017, the WFTO board appointed Erinch Sahan as chief executive.

== WFTO verification and logo ==
In 2004 WFTO launched a verification scheme and mark. WFTO states that the FTO Mark identifies registered Fair Trade Organizations worldwide (as opposed to products in the case of FLO International and Fairtrade mark) and guarantees that standards are being implemented regarding working conditions, wages, child labor and the environment. These standards are verified by self-assessment, mutual reviews and external verification. The FTO Mark is available to all WFTO members who meet the requirements of the WFTO Standards and Monitoring System and so far over 150 organizations have registered.

The WFTO logo is for organizations that demonstrate a 100% commitment to Fair Trade in all their business activities. Only monitored WFTO members are authorized to use the logo. The Fair Trade Organization Mark (WFTO Logo) shows that an organization follows the WFTO's 10 Principles of Fair Trade, covering working conditions, transparency, wages, the environment, gender equity and more.

The WFTO logo is not a product mark - it is used to brand organisations that are committed to 100% Fair Trade. It sets them apart from commercial as well as other Fair Trade businesses, and provides a clear signal to retailers, partners, governments and donors that their core activity is Fair Trade.

The system was originally designed for marginalised producers currently not catered for by the Fairtrade Certification system, which was designed for commodity products. Due to the variety and complexity of handcrafts, for example, a product standard is technically difficult to apply. The system, then, provides an alternative that will verify that an organisation practices Fair Trade in all its activities. Once certified, the organisation will be able to use the label on all its products.

Since the seventies, several groups and conferences discussed the implementation of regulations regarding trade. However, The WFTO was not established until the early nineties. The WFTO has several hundred partnerships across the globe.

== 10 principles of Fair Trade ==
WFTO prescribes 10 Principles that Fair Trade Organizations must follow in their day-to-day work and carries out monitoring to ensure these principles are upheld:

1. Creating Opportunities for Economically Disadvantaged Producers
2. Transparency and Accountability
3. Fair Trading Practices
4. Payment of a Fair Price
5. Ensuring no Child Labor and Forced Labor
6. Commitment to Non Discrimination, Gender Equity and Freedom of Association
7. Ensuring Good Working Conditions
8. Providing Capacity Building
9. Promoting Fair Trade
10. Respect for the Environment

== Regional representative bodies ==
The WFTO operates in five key regions: Africa, Asia, Latin America, Europe and North America & Pacific Rim.
Members in Africa, Asia, Europe and Latin America have come together to form WFTO regional chapters.

=== Africa: COFTA ===
The Cooperation for Fair Trade in Africa - COFTA is the network of Fair Trade producer organisations operating in Africa and working with disadvantaged small-scale producers.

=== Asia: WFTO-Asia ===
The Asian chapter of WFTO operates in 20 countries and comprises over 140 fair trade organizations. Member nations include: Bangladesh, China, Cambodia, Georgia, India, Indonesia, Japan, South Korea, Laos, Malaysia, Nepal, Pakistan, Philippines, Sri Lanka, Thailand and Vietnam. Their roles in the fair trade operations vary, and included are: producers, cooperatives, retailers, NGO's, and faith-based organizations, amongst others.

=== Europe: WFTO-EUROPE ===
WFTO-Europe, formerly known as IFAT Europe (International Federation for Alternative Trade), is formed by 84 members, amongst them Fair Trade organizations, Fair Trade networks and support organizations. It represents the European chapter of the World Fair Trade Organization.

In 2009, the Network of European Worldshops (NEWS) was integrated into WFTO-Europe.

=== Latin America: WFTO-LA ===
WFTO-LA is currently composed of 55 members from 13 countries of Latin America. The Regional Office is located in Areguá, Paraguay.

=== The Pacific-Rim: WFTO-PACIFIC ===
WFTO-PacificRim is currently composed of 23 members from 5 countries around the Pacific - New Zealand, Australia, Japan, Canada, and USA. The Regional Office is located in Irvine, near Los Angeles, California, USA.
