= Max Havelaar (disambiguation) =

Max Havelaar is an 1860 Dutch novel written by Multatuli.

Max Havelaar may also refer to:

- Max Havelaar, a character from the novel Max Havelaar
- Max Havelaar (film), a 1976 Dutch film adaption of the novel Max Havelaar
- Stichting Max Havelaar, a Dutch Fairtrade organisation
- Association Max Havelaar France, a French Fairtrade organisation
- Max Havelaar-Stiftung (Schweiz), a Swiss Fairtrade organisation
- Max Havelaar label or International Fairtrade Certification Mark, a trade certification mark of FLO International
