= Fair trade (disambiguation) =

Fair trade is a social movement to help producers in developing countries achieve better trading conditions.

Fairtrade or fair trade may also refer to:

- World Fair Trade Organisation, a global community of verified Fair Trade Enterprises
- Fair trade law, a law in the United States permitting manufacturers to specify a minimum retail price
- Fair Trade Certified Mark
- Fair trade certification
- Fairtrade certification, a widespread standard for labelling products produced by fair trade, overseen by FLO International
- Fairtrade International, Fairtrade, Fairtrade Labelling Organizations International e.V. (FLO), FLO International
- Fair Trade Services, an American record label
- FLOCert
- Office of Fair Trading (UK)
- Trade justice, efforts to counteract unfair consequences of globalisation and of free trade
- "Fair Trade" (Land of the Lost), an episode of the 1974 television series
- "Fair Trade" (Star Trek: Voyager), an episode of the television series
- "Fair Trade" (song), a song by Drake from his 2021 album Certified Lover Boy

== See also ==
- Fair trading (disambiguation)
