= Fair-trade coffee =

Coffee certified as produced to fair-trade standards

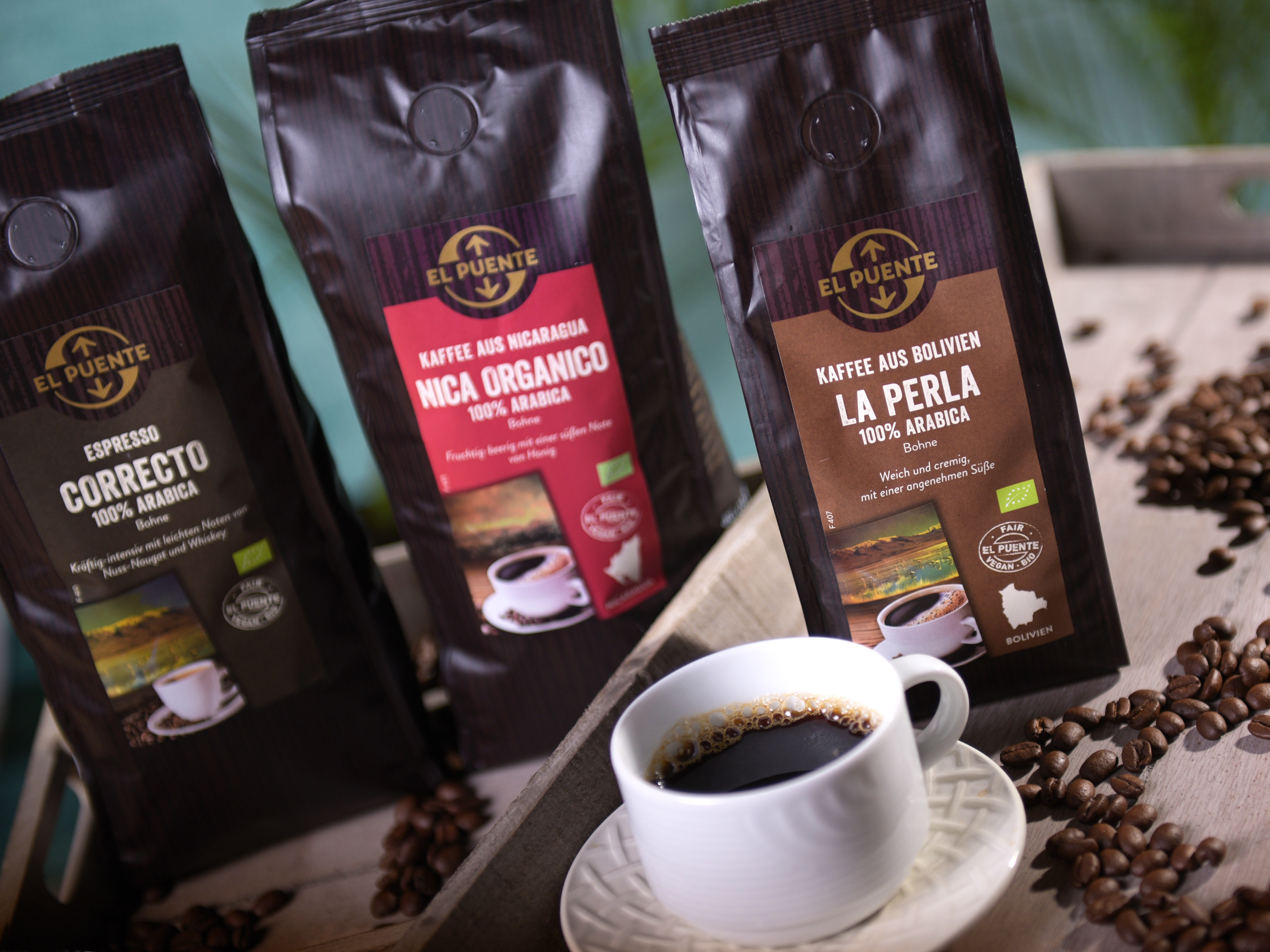
Coffee packages labelled "fair" on the lower right

Fair-trade coffee is coffee that is certified as having been produced to fair-trade standards by fair-trade organizations, which create trading partnerships that are based on dialogue, transparency and respect, with the goal of achieving greater equity in international trade. These partnerships contribute to sustainable development by offering better trading conditions to coffee bean farmers. Fair-trade organizations support producers and sustainable environmental farming practices and prohibit child labor or forced labor.

== History ==
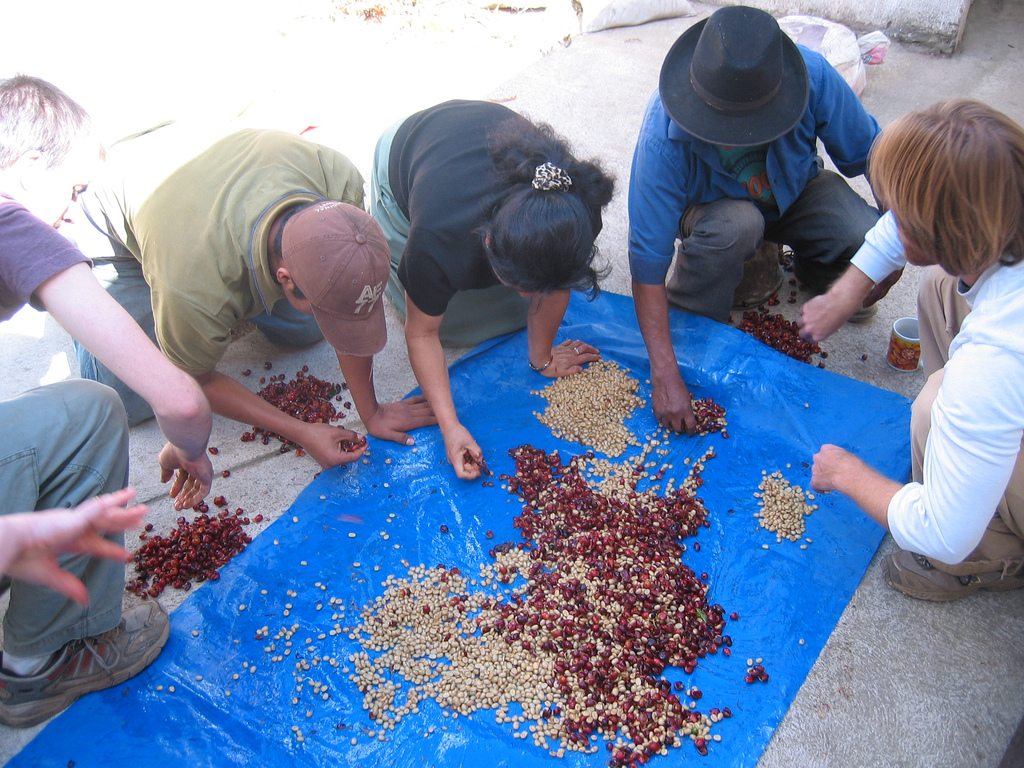
Fair-trade coffee beans being sorted

Prior to fair trade, prices were regulated by the International Coffee Organization according to the regulations set forth by the International Coffee Agreement of 1962. This agreement, which was negotiated at the United Nations by the Coffee Study Group, set limits on the amount of coffee traded between countries so there would be no excess supply and consequent drop in price. The ICA existed for five years and then was renewed in 1968.

The agreement was renegotiated in 1976 due to increasing coffee prices, largely a result of a severe frost in Brazil. The new agreement allowed for the suspension of price quotas if the supply of coffee could not meet the demand, and enabling them if prices dropped too low.

In 1984, the agreement was again redrawn, this time creating a database on coffee trade, and implementing stricter import and export regulations.

Fair-trade certification was then introduced in 1988 following a coffee crisis in which the supply of coffee was greater than the demand; since no price quotas had been reimplemented by the International Coffee Act, the market was flooded. Launched in the Netherlands, fair-trade certification aimed to artificially raise coffee prices in order to ensure growers sufficient wages to turn a profit. The original name of the organization was "Max Havelaar", after a fictional Dutch character who opposed the exploitation of coffee farmers by Dutch colonialists in the East Indies. The organization created a label for products that met certain wage standards.

Quotas remained a part of the agreement until 1989, when the organization was unable to negotiate a new agreement in time for the next year. It was decided that the 1983 agreement would be extended, but without the quotas because they had not yet been determined. A new agreement could not be negotiated until 1992.

From 1990 to 1992, without the quotas in place, coffee prices reached an all-time low because coffee price quotas could not be decided.

The agreements of 2001 and 2007 aimed to stabilize the coffee economy by promoting coffee consumption, raising the standard of living of growers by providing economic counselling, expanding research to include niche markets and quality relating to geographic area, and conducting studies of sustainability, principles similar to fair trade.

Following the inception of fair-trade certification, the "Transfair" label was later launched in Germany, and within ten years three other labeling organizations commenced: The Fairtrade Foundation, TransFair USA, and Rättvisemärkt. In 1997, these four organizations jointly created Fairtrade International (formerly called FLO, or Fairtrade Labelling Organizations International), which continues to set Fairtrade standards, inspecting and certifying growers.

== Fair-trade organizations ==
The fair-trade–labeling organizations having most of the market share and who sell through supermarkets refer to a definition developed by FINE, an association of four international fair-trade networks: Fairtrade Labelling Organizations International (FLO), World Fair Trade Organization (WFTO), Network of European World shops and European Fair Trade Association (EFTA). The standards developed by FLO are the most widely used, being the overall body that governs the fairtrade system. It aims to achieve high standards within the fairtrade system in terms of credibility, compliance of fairtrade standards by producers, traders, and retailers. FLO's main tasks are:

- Setting international fair-trade standards
  - FLO provides independent, transparent and competent standard setting by proposing the Fairtrade Standards to the FLO Board that decides if standards are met. Each producer or trader has to meet the Generic Standards and the Product Standards which guarantees minimum prices that are considered fair to producers. They also aim for long term trading relationships and environmental sustainability.
- Facilitating and developing fair-trade business
  - The FLO works with both Fairtrade-certified producer organizations and traders to match supply and demand. It is also responsible for strengthening these organizations and improve their access to the market.
- Making the case for fair-trade justice
  - FLO together with other international fair-trade organizations, IFAT, NEWS and EFTA respectively, have created a common Platform called FINE (standing for the initial letters of FLO, IFAT, NEWS and EFTA) to work together to promote the case for trade justice in debates on trade and development.

== Certification scheme and competition ==
The certification scheme is run by Fairtrade International (FLO). Fairtrade has become the most dominant fair-trade label and has attracted a lot of competitors challenging its monopoly as an ethical label. Several labels from competitors have been created using different certification schemes. Non-governmental organizations (NGOs) and nonprofit organizations are the main threats causing enormous headache for FLO regulating authorities. A few examples include the Smithsonian Migratory Bird Center's Bird-Friendly Coffee, which promotes practices that help to protect the habitat of migrating birds, the American NGO Rainforest Alliance, whose mission is to protect ecosystems and to preserve biodiversity and sustainability of modes of production, and UTZ Certified, which focuses on improving the efficiency and market access of producers. However, most of these organizations are criticized for failing to guarantee minimum price, failing to provide pre-financing facilities, favouring plantations at the expense of family farms. The greatest idea about the certification scheme and its competitors is that they all have a logic of innovation they constantly attempt to innovate rather than generating income only but proactively meet the changing needs of different objectives with different ambitions.

Coffee packers pay Fairtrade a fee for the right to use the Fairtrade logo, which gives consumers an assurance that the coffee meets Fairtrade criteria. The coffee with this certification mark must be produced by farmers and cooperatives that meet these criteria.

== Coffee retailers ==
Coffee retailers are not restricted by Fairtrade to sell Fairtrade coffee as a premium product and charge as much as they like for the coffee.

== Importers ==
Importers of Fairtrade coffee have to be registered with Fairtrade and pay a fee. Under the Fairtrade International standards they are obliged to pay a minimum price to the exporting organization, currently $1.40c/lb New York Board of Trade “C” contract, F.O.B. origin for Arabica, and $1.05 for Robusta London “EURONEXT LIFFE” contract, F.O.B origin with 30c/lb extra for organic. When the world price is above this level, they are obliged to pay 20c/lb above the world price.

== Exporters ==
Fair-trade–certified coffee is normally exported by secondary or tertiary cooperatives, marketing this coffee on behalf of the cooperatives the farmers belong to with arrangements that may be complex. There is not enough demand to take all the certified coffee produced, so most has to be sold as uncertified. In 2001, only 13.6% could be sold as certified, so limits were placed on new cooperatives joining the scheme. This, plus increased demand, increased sales of certified to around 50% in 2003 with a figure of 37% commonly cited in recent years. Some exporting cooperatives do not manage to sell any of their output as certified, and others sell as little as 8%.

The exporting cooperatives incur costs including certification and inspection fees, additional marketing costs, costs of conforming to standards, and additional costs of cooperative operation, costs which are incurred on all coffee production, even if little or none is marketed as certified, with a higher price, so the cooperatives may make a loss on Fairtrade membership. Weber reports cooperatives not able to cover the extra costs of a marketing team for Fairtrade, with one covering only 70% of these costs after six years of Fairtrade membership.

Any deficit after paying these costs means a lower price for farmers, while any surplus will normally go on “social projects” for “common goals” organized by the exporting cooperative rather than as extra payment for farmers. These may include the building of classrooms, baseball fields, or the establishment of women's groups, for instance.

== Enforcement of standards ==
FLO-CERT, a for-profit business owned by Fairtrade International, handles producer certification, inspecting and certifying producer organizations in more than 50 countries in Africa, Asia, and Latin America. In the fair-trade debate there are many complaints of failure to enforce these standards, with farmers, cooperatives, importers and packers.

== Labor ==
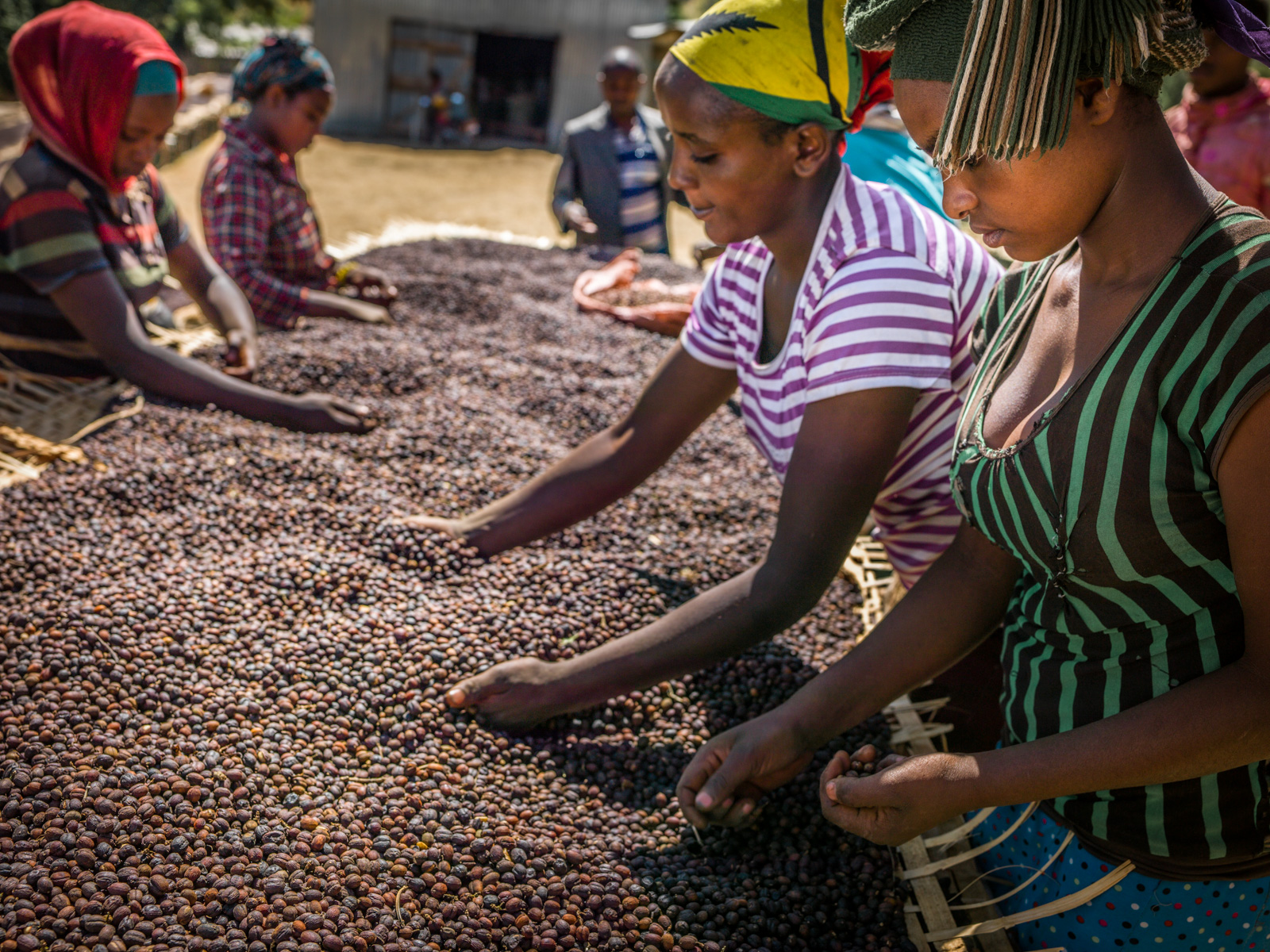
Workers sorting coffee near Hawassa in the Sidama region of Ethiopia

Fairtrade International maintains two separate production standards: the Standard for Small-scale Producer Organisations, which applies to organized groups of smallholders, and the Hired Labour Standard, which applies to "organisations which rely on a hired workforce to supply Fairtrade certified products". Coffee is certified only under the former. Under that standard a majority of an organization's members must be smallholders "who don't depend on hired workers all the time, but run their farm mainly by using their own and their family's labour". The Hired Labour Standard, which requires employers to recognize independent trade unions, to pay at least the regional average or the legal minimum wage, and to place the Fairtrade Premium under a committee including worker representatives, covers products such as flowers, tea, fresh fruit and fresh vegetables, but not coffee. According to Laura Raynolds, coffee, cocoa, sugar, honey, rice and cotton "are the only Fairtrade products which remain closed to large producers", small-farmer organizations having opposed the certification of plantations in those crops.

Smallholder coffee production nevertheless depends on wage labor, particularly at harvest. A study funded by the UK Department for International Development reported that the reliance of export agriculture on wage labor is "generally ignored", and that this reliance "is true of small coffee farms in Ethiopia and Uganda as it is true of large (coffee or cut flower) plantations". In a survey of cooperatives holding Fairtrade and organic certification in the Sidama region of Ethiopia, seasonal workers hired for the October-to-January harvest made up 78 per cent of the workforce employed by smallholder households; a typical household hired about six workers for three to five months, while larger farms hired twenty to thirty at peak, and cooperatives employed between twenty and a hundred seasonal workers during processing alongside seven to twenty permanent staff.

Research on whether certification raises the pay of these workers has generally found little effect. The DFID-funded study "was unable to find any evidence that Fairtrade has made a positive difference to the wages and working conditions of those employed in the production of the commodities produced for Fairtrade certified export", and reported that in some cases workers in areas with Fairtrade producer organizations were "significantly worse paid, and treated" than those employed in the production of the same commodities in areas without them. A systematic review of 43 quantitative and 136 qualitative studies of agricultural certification published between 1990 and 2016 found that certified farmers received higher prices for their produce but that "workers' wages do not seem to benefit from the presence of" certification schemes. The Ethiopian survey similarly found minimal differences in wages between certified and non-certified employers, with daily wages remaining below the national poverty threshold in both.

Certification has been associated with improvements in the formal terms of employment. In the Ethiopian survey, written employment contracts were held by 30 per cent of the workers employed by certified households, against 4 per cent of those employed by non-certified households, and by 72 per cent of certified cooperatives' employees against 52 per cent at non-certified cooperatives; trade union membership among cooperative workers was 41 per cent at certified cooperatives against 15 per cent at non-certified ones, and participation in child-labor prevention training was higher, although training on gender equality showed no significant difference. The authors concluded that these benefits did not reach workers in "household or informal farm labor arrangements", who remained "largely excluded due to weak enforcement mechanisms and the pervasive informality characterizing these contexts".

== Marketing system ==
The marketing system for Fairtrade and non-Fairtrade coffee is identical in the consuming countries, using mostly the same importing, packing, distributing and retailing firms. Some independent brands operate a virtual company, paying the normal importers, packers and distributors and advertising agencies to handle their brand rather than doing it themselves, for cost reasons.

Many fair-trade organizations remain that adhere to a greater or smaller degree to the original objectives of fair trade than the mainstream of Fairtrade International and its associate. These market products through alternative channels where possible, and market through specialist fair-trade shops, but they have a small proportion of the total market.

== Criticisms ==
Criticisms of fair trade have been made as a result of independent research, and these are summarized in the fair-trade debate.

There are also some criticisms of fair trade specific to coffee. Colleen Haight of the Stanford Innovation Review argues that fair-trade coffee is merely a way to market the idea of ethical consumerism. Quality and transparency concerns regarding coffee are increasingly common amongst some consumers and coffee companies, as seen through the rise of the third wave coffee movement. Maintaining a balance between ethical and higher-quality coffee may be difficult with fair-trade coffee due to what some coffee roasters deem as insufficient quality incentive within many fair-trade–certified coffee farms. Deborah Sick's research, involving interviews with coffee farmers in Costa Rica, finds that many farmers often produce more fair-trade coffee than they can sell, so will often end up selling to independent buyers that will often pay more than fair-trade buyers can. Some scholars are concerned of the artificial stimulation of coffee production, especially since worldwide demand for coffee is relatively inelastic.

Many who believe fair-trade coffee is insufficient use the direct trade model, which allows for more control over quality concerns, farmer empowerment, and sustainability issues. It is also valuable in fostering closer farmer to roaster business relationships, which can ultimately increase quality of life and profits for coffee growers and buyers alike. However, direct trade is a new concept that is only utilized by for profit businesses like Counter Culture Coffee and Intelligentsia Coffee and therefore has no third party certification.

Fair trade has become a repetition of free trade rather than being an alternative to the market economy which is dominated by supply and demand. Fair trade is not fulfilling its promise of creating opportunities for economically disadvantaged producers. Poverty has become a commodity through fair trade within its label that labels goods produced by the poor, giving it visibility that it did not have before but leaving the marginalized people in worse circumstances.

== See also ==
- Anti-globalization
- Organic agriculture
- Rainforest Alliance
- Sustainable coffee
- World Trade Organization
