= Fairtrade Canada =

National non-profit certification and public education organization

- Type: Non-profit organization
- Founded: 1997; 29 years ago
- Headquarters: Ottawa, Ontario, Canada
- Website: www.fairtrade.ca

Fairtrade Canada, formerly TransFair Canada, is a national non-profit certification and public education organization promoting Fairtrade certified products in Canada to improve the livelihood of developing world farmers and workers. It is the Canadian member of FLO International, which unites 24 fair trade producer and certification initiatives across Europe, Asia, Latin America, North America, Africa, Australia and New Zealand.

== How Fairtrade works ==
With Fairtrade coffee, for instance, packers in developed countries pay a fee to The Fairtrade Foundation for the right to use the brand and logo, and nearly all the fee goes on marketing. Packers and retailers can charge as much as they want for the coffee. The coffee has to come from a certified Fairtrade cooperative, and there is a minimum price when the world market is oversupplied, and 10c per lb extra at other times. The cooperatives can, on average, sell only a third of their output as Fairtrade, because of lack of demand, and sell the rest at world prices.

The exporting cooperative can spend the money in several ways. Some goes on meeting the costs of conformity and certification: as they have to meet Fairtrade standards on all they produce, they have to recover the costs from a small part of their turnover, sometimes as little as 8%, and may not make any profit. Some meets other costs. Some is spent on social projects such as building schools, clinics and baseball pitches. Sometimes there is money left over for the farmers. The cooperatives sometimes pay farmers a higher price than farmers do, sometimes less, but there is no evidence on which is more common. In some cases the farmers certainly do not get enough extra to cover their extra costs in conforming to Fairtrade standards. There is little or no research on the extra costs incurred or the extra revenue.

The marketing system for Fairtrade and non-Fairtrade coffee is identical in the consuming countries, using mostly the same importing, packing, distributing and retailing firms. Some independent brands operate a virtual company, paying importers, packers and distributors and advertising agencies to handle their brand, for cost reasons. In the producing country Fairtrade is marketed only by Fairtrade cooperatives, while other coffee is marketed by Fairtrade cooperatives (as uncertified coffee), by other cooperatives and by ordinary traders.

To become certified Fairtrade producers, the primary cooperative and its member farmers must operate to certain political standards, imposed from Europe. FLO-CERT, the for-profit side, handles producer certification, inspecting and certifying producer organizations in more than 50 countries in Africa, Asia, and Latin America. In the Fair trade debate there are many complaints of failure to enforce these standards, with producers, cooperatives, importers and packers profiting by evading them.

== Work ==
=== Certification ===
Fairtrade Canada is responsible for certifying that Canadian products bearing the Fairtrade certification marks meet international Fairtrade standards. While the entire certification system monitors supply chains from the producers until the final point of packaging, we are responsible for monitoring and auditing products once they enter Canada, to ensure that what is sold as fair trade certified actually is.

=== Licensing ===
Fairtrade Canada licenses Canadian companies to use the fair trade certification marks on their products, and as part of that license companies must abide by strict mark-use standards. Fairtrade Canada monitors these licensed organisations to ensure that the markings are not used in a way that is misleading to the public, and work with companies to ensure their use does not undermine the integrity of the marks.

=== Promotion ===
Fairtrade Canada works alongside community groups, companies, and individual citizens to promote fair trade certified products. Through partnerships, campaigns, promotional materials, events, and media engagement, the organisation works to develop peoples' understanding of fair trade and to build momentum so that more producers can sell more of their products on fair terms.

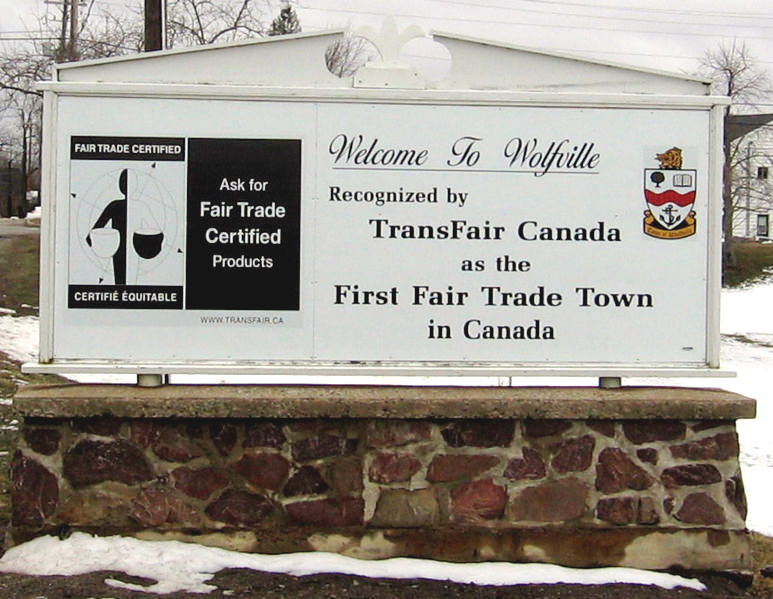
Sign announcing Wolfville's (Canada) Fair Trade Town status

The following fair trade products are currently certified by Fairtrade Canada and available throughout the country: coffee, tea, cocoa, sugar, fresh fruit, grains (rice and quinoa), spices and herbs, cotton, wine, flowers, nuts and oils (shea butter and olive oil), and sports balls.

Fairtrade Canada organizes and coordinates several events every year to promote fair trade in Canada, most notably the Fair Trade Fortnight (or the Quinzaine du Commerce Équitable in French) which typically run in May, and the Canadian Fairtrade Towns campaign.

In 2007, Fairtrade certified sales in Canada amounted to CAD $120 million, a 55% year-to-year increase. Furthermore, in 2005 it was estimated that approximately 27% of the Canadian adult population was aware of fair trade certified coffee, up from 17% in 2003 and 11% in 2001.

== Criticisms ==
=== Ethical basis of criticisms ===
Consumers have been shown to be content paying higher prices for Fairtrade products, in the belief that this helps the very poor. The main ethical criticism of Fairtrade is that this premium over non-Fairtrade products does not reach the producers and is instead collected by businesses, employees of co-operatives or used for unnecessary expenses. Furthermore, research has cited the implementation of certain Fairtrade standards as a cause for greater inequalities in markets where these rigid rules are inappropriate for the specific market.

=== What happens to the money ===
==== Little money reaches the Third World ====
The Fairtrade Foundation does not monitor how much extra retailers charge for Fairtrade goods, so it is rarely possible to determine how much extra is charged or how much reaches the producers, in spite of the Unfair Trading legislation. In four cases it has been possible to find out. One British café chain was passing on less than one percent of the extra charged to the exporting cooperative; in Finland, Valkila, Haaparanta and Niemi found that consumers paid much more for Fairtrade, and that only 11.5% reached the exporter. Kilian, Jones, Pratt and Villalobos talk of US Fairtrade coffee getting $5 per lb extra at retail, of which the exporter would have received only 2%. Mendoza and Bastiaensen calculated that in the UK only 1.6% to 18% of the extra charged for one product line reached the farmer. All these studies assume that the importers paid the full Fairtrade price, which is not necessarily the case.

==== Less money reaches farmers ====
The Fairtrade Foundation does not monitor how much of the extra money paid to the exporting cooperatives reaches the farmer. The cooperatives incur costs in reaching the Fairtrade political standards, and these are incurred on all production, even if only a small amount is sold at Fairtrade prices. The most successful cooperatives appear to spend a third of the extra price received on this: some less successful cooperatives spend more than they gain. While this appears to be agreed by proponents and critics of Fairtrade, there is a dearth of economic studies setting out the actual revenues and what the money was spent on. FLO figures are that 40% of the money reaching the Third World is spent on ‘business and production’ which would include these costs, as well as costs incurred by any inefficiency and corruption in the cooperative or the marketing system. The rest is stated to be spent on social projects, rather than being passed on to farmers. There is no evidence that Fairtrade farmers get higher prices on average. Anecdotes state that farmers were paid more or less by traders than by Fairtrade cooperatives. Few of these anecdotes address the problems of price reporting in Third World markets, and few appreciate the complexity of the different price packages which may or may not include credit, harvesting, transport, processing, etc. Cooperatives typically average prices over the year, so they pay less than traders at some times, more at others. Bassett (2009) is able to compare prices only where Fairtrade and non-Fairtrade farmers have to sell cotton to the same monopsonistic ginneries which pay low prices. Prices would have to be higher to compensate farmers for the increased costs they incur to produce Fairtrade. For instance, Fairtrade encouraged Nicaraguan farmers to switch to organic coffee, which resulted in a higher price per pound, but a lower net income because of higher costs and lower yields.

==== Lack of evidence of impact ====
There have been very few attempts at fair trade impact studies. It would be methodologically and logically incorrect to use these attempts to conclude that Fairtrade in general does or does not have a positive impact. Griffiths (2011) argues that few of these attempts meet the normal standards for an impact study, such as comparing the before and after situation, and having meaningful control groups. Serious methodological problems arise in sampling, in comparing prices, and from the fact that the social projects of Fairtrade do not usually aim to produce economic benefits.

=== Inefficient marketing system ===
One reason for low prices is that Fairtrade farmers have to sell through a monopsonist cooperative, which may be inefficient or corrupt – certainly some private traders are more efficient than some cooperatives. They cannot choose the buyer who offers the best price, or switch when their cooperative is going bankrupt if they wish to retain fairtrade status. There are also complaints that Fairtrade deviates from the free market ideal of some economists. Brink calls fair trade a "misguided attempt to make up for market failures" encouraging market inefficiencies and overproduction.

==== Corruption ====
The Fair Trade marketing system provides more opportunities for corruption than the normal marketing system; and less possibility of, or incentive for, controlling corruption. Corruption has been noted in false labelling of coffee as Fairtrade by retailers and by packers in the developing countries, paying exporters less than the Fairtrade price for Fairtrade coffee (kickbacks) failure to provide the credit and other services specified theft or preferential treatment for ruling elites of cooperatives not paying laborers the specified minimum wage

=== Fairtrade harms other farmers ===
==== Overproduction argument ====
Critics argue that Fairtrade harms all non-Fairtrade farmers. Fairtrade claims that its farmers are paid higher prices and are given special advice on increasing yields and quality. Economists state that, if this is indeed so, Fairtrade farmers will increase production. As the demand for coffee is highly inelastic, a small increase in supply means a large fall in market price, so perhaps a million Fairtrade farmers get a higher price and 24 million others get a substantially lower price. Critics quote the example of farmers in Vietnam being paid over the world price in the 1980s, planting much coffee, then flooding the world market in the 1990s. The Fairtrade minimum price means that when the world market price collapses, it is the non-Fairtrade farmers, particularly the poorest, who have to cut down their coffee trees. This argument is supported by mainstream economists, not just free marketers. This argument falls away if, as critics and FLO state, farmers do not get a higher price.

==== Diverting aid from other farmers ====
Fairtrade supporters boast of ‘The Honeypot Effect’ – that cooperatives which become Fairtrade members then attract additional aid from other NGO charities, government and international donors as a result of their membership. Typically there are now six to twelve other donors. Critics point out that this inevitably means that resources are being removed from other, poorer, farmers. It also makes it impossible to argue that any positive or negative changes in the living standards of farmers are due to Fairtrade rather than to one of the other donors.

=== Other ethical issues ===
==== Secretiveness ====
Under EU law (Directive 2005/29/EC on Unfair Commercial Practices) the criminal offence of Unfair Trading is committed if (a) ‘it contains false information and is therefore untruthful or in any way, including overall presentation, deceives or is likely to deceive the average consumer, even if the information is factually correct’, (b) ‘it omits material information that the average consumer needs . . . and thereby causes or is likely to cause the average consumer to take a transactional decision that he would not have taken otherwise’ or (c) ‘fails to identify the commercial intent of the commercial practice . . . [which] causes or is likely to cause the average consumer to take a transactional decision that he would not have taken otherwise.’ Griffiths (2011) points to false claims that Fairtrade producers get higher prices, the almost universal failure to disclose the extra price charged for Fairtrade products, to disclose how much of this actually reaches the Third World, to disclose what this is spent on in the Third World, to disclose how much, if any, reaches farmers, and to disclose the harm that Fairtrade does to non-Fairtrade farmers. He also points to the failure to disclose when ‘the primary commercial intent’ is to make money for retailers and distributors in rich countries.

==== Imposing politics ====
The Fairtrade criteria are essentially political, and critics state that it is unethical to bribe Third World producers to adopt a set of political views that they may not agree with, and the donors providing the money may not agree with. In addition many of the failures of Fairtrade derive from these political views, such as the unorthodox marketing system imposed. Boersma (2002, 2009) the founder of Fairtrade, and like minded people are aiming at a new, non-capitalist way of running the market and the economy. This may not tie in with the objectives of producers, consumers, importers or retailers.

==== Unethical selling techniques ====
Booth says that the selling techniques used by some sellers and some supporters of Fairtrade are bullying, misleading, and unethical. There are problems with the use of boycott campaigns and other pressure to force sellers to stock a product they think ethically suspect. However, the opposite has been argued, that a more participatory and multi-stakeholder approach to auditing might improve the quality of the process. Some people argue that these practices are justifiable: that strategic use of labeling may help embarrass (or encourage) major suppliers into changing their practices. They may make transparent corporate vulnerabilities that activists can exploit. Or they may encourage ordinary people to get involved with broader projects of social change.

==== Misleading volunteers ====
A lot of people volunteer to work to support Fairtrade. They may do unpaid work for firms, or market Fairtrade in schools, universities, local governments, or parliament. Crane and Davies’ study shows that distributors in developed countries make ‘considerable use of unpaid volunteer workers for routine tasks, many of whom seemed to be under the (false) impression that they were helping out a charity.’

=== Failure to monitor standards ===
There are complaints that the standards are inappropriate and may harm producers, sometimes making them work several months more for little return.

There have been claims that adherence to fair trade standards by producers has been poor and that enforcement of standards by Fairtrade is very weak. Notably by Christian Jacquiau and by Paola Ghillani, who spent four years as president of Fairtrade Labelling Organizations There are many complaints of poor enforcement problems: labourers on Fairtrade farms in Peru are paid less than the minimum wage; some non-Fairtrade coffee is sold as Fairtrade; "the standards are not very strict in the case of seasonally hired labour in coffee production", "some fair trade standards are not strictly enforced", and supermarkets avoid their responsibility. In 2006, a Financial Times journalist found that ten out of ten mills visited had sold uncertified coffee to co-operatives as certified. It reported that "The FT was also handed evidence of at least one coffee association that received Fairtrade certification despite illegally growing some 20 per cent of its coffee in protected national forest land.

=== Trade justice and fair trade ===
Segments of the trade justice movement have also criticized fair trade in the past years for allegedly focusing too much on individual small producer groups while stopping short of advocating immediate trade policy changes that would have a larger impact on disadvantaged producers' lives. French author and RFI correspondent Jean-Pierre Boris championed this view in his 2005 book Commerce inéquitable.

=== Political objections ===
There have been largely political criticisms of Fairtrade from the left and the right. Some believe the fair trade system is not radical enough. French author Christian Jacquiau, in his book Les coulisses du commerce équitable, calls for stricter fair trade standards and criticizes the fair trade movement for working within the current system (i.e., partnerships with mass retailers, multinational corporations, etc.) rather than establishing a new fairer, fully autonomous trading system. Jacquiau is also a staunch supporter of significantly higher fair trade prices in order to maximize the impact, as most producers only sell a portion of their crop under fair trade terms. It has been argued that the approach of the FairTrade system is too rooted in a Northern consumerist view of justice which Southern producers do not participate in setting. "A key issue is therefore to make explicit who possesses the power to define the terms of Fairtrade, that is who possesses the power to determine the need of an ethic in the first instance, and subsequently command a particular ethical vision as the truth."
