= International Fairtrade Certification Mark =

Certification mark

International Fairtrade Mark
- The International Fairtrade Certification Mark
- Certifying agency: Fairtrade International
- Effective since: 2002; 24 years ago
- Product category: Various

The International Fairtrade Certification Mark is an independent Fair trade certification mark used in over 69 countries. It appears on products as an independent guarantee that a product has been produced according to fair trade political standards.

The Fairtrade Mark is owned and protected by Fairtrade International (FLO), on behalf of its 25-member and associate member Fairtrade producer networks and labelling initiatives.

For a product to carry the Fairtrade Mark, it must come from FLOCert inspected and certified producer organizations. The crops must be marketed in accordance with the International Fairtrade standards set by Fairtrade International. The supply chain is also monitored by FLOCert. To become certified Fairtrade producers, the primary cooperative and its member farmers must operate to certain political standards, imposed from Europe. FLO-CERT, the for-profit side, handles producer certification, inspecting and certifying producer organisations in more than 50 countries in Africa, Asia, and Latin America. In the Fair trade debate there are many complaints of failure to enforce these standards, with Fairtrade cooperatives, importers and packers profiting by evading them.

As of 2006, the following products currently carry the Fairtrade Mark: coffee, tea, chocolate, cocoa, sugar, bananas, apples, pears, grapes, plums, lemons, oranges, Satsumas, clementines, lychees, avocados, pineapples, mangoes, fruit juices, quinoa, peppers, green beans, coconut, dried fruit, rooibos tea, green tea, cakes and biscuits, honey, muesli, cereal bars, jams, chutney and sauces, herbs and spices, nuts and nut oil, wine, beer, rum, flowers, footballs, rice, yogurt, baby food, sugar body scrub, cotton wool and cotton products.

== How it works ==
The marketing system for Fairtrade and non-Fairtrade coffee is identical in the consuming countries, using mostly the same importing, packing, distributing and retailing firms. Some independent brands operate a virtual company, paying importers, packers and distributors and advertising agencies to handle their brand, for cost reasons. In the producing country Fairtrade is marketed only by Fairtrade cooperatives, while other coffee is marketed by Fairtrade cooperatives (as uncertified coffee), by other cooperatives and by ordinary traders.

Retailers and cafes in the rich countries can sell Fairtrade coffee at any price they like, so nearly all the extra price paid by consumers, 82% to 99%, is kept in the rich countries as increased profit. There is however evidence that dishonest importers do not pay the full Fairtrade price, so an even smaller proportion reaches the Global South.

Cooperative traders and exporters can sell coffee as Fairtrade certified if they meet the political standards of FLO and they pay a certification and inspection fee. Other administration costs and production costs are incurred to meet these standards. The exporter (not the farmer) is paid a minimum price for Fairtrade certified coffee when the world market is oversupplied, and a Fairtrade premium of 15c per lb at other times. The cooperatives can, on average, sell only a third of their output as Fairtrade, because of lack of demand, and sell the rest at world prices. As the additional costs are incurred on all production, not just that sold as Fairtrade, cooperatives sometimes lose money on their Fairtrade membership. After the additional costs have been subtracted from the Fairtrade price, the rest goes on ‘Social Projects’ such as clinics, women’s groups and baseball pitches.

Farmers do not get any of the higher price under Fairtrade. Nor is there any evidence that they get higher prices as a result of better marketing: the cooperatives sometimes pay farmers a higher price than farmers do, sometimes less, but there is no evidence on which is more common. Farmers do, however, incur extra costs in producing Fairtrade, so they certainly do lose money from Fairtrade membership in some cases. There is little or no research on the extra costs incurred, or the effect of Fairtrade membership on the income of farmers.

Disambiguation: There is widespread confusion because the fair trade industry standards provided by Fairtrade International (The Fairtrade Labelling Organization) use the word “producer” in many different senses, often in the same specification document. Sometimes it refers to farmers, sometimes to the primary cooperatives they belong to, to the secondary cooperatives that the primary cooperatives belong to, or to the tertiary cooperatives that the secondary cooperatives may belong to but “Producer [also] means any entity that has been certified under the Fairtrade International Generic Fairtrade Standard for Small Producer Organizations, Generic Fairtrade Standard for Hired Labour Situations, or Generic Fairtrade Standard for Contract Production.". The word is used in all these meanings in key documents. In practice, when price and credit are discussed, “producer” means the exporting organization, “For small producers’ organizations, payment must be made directly to the certified small producers’ organization”. and “In the case of a small producers’ organization [e.g. for coffee], Fairtrade Minimum Prices are set at the level of the Producer Organization, not at the level of individual producers (members of the organization)" which means that the "producer" here is halfway up the marketing chain between the farmer and the consumer. The part of the standards referring to cultivation, environment, pesticides and child labour has the farmer as "producer". The part referring to democratic organization has the primary cooperative as "producer".

Fairtrade Standards contain minimum requirements that all producer organisations must meet to become certified as well as progress requirements in which producers must demonstrate improvements over time.

There are several types of Fairtrade Standards: Standards for small farmers' organizations.”, standards for hired labour situations, standards for contract situations and standards for trade (importers), and there are also standards for the different products.

Fairtrade Standards for small farmers' organizations include requirements for democratic decision making, ensuring that producers have a say in how the Fairtrade Premiums are invested etc. They also include requirements for capacity building and economic strengthening of the organization.

Fairtrade Standards for hired labour situations ensure that employees receive minimum wages and bargain collectively. Fairtrade-certified plantations must also ensure that there is no forced or child labour and that health and safety requirements are met. (These labor standards do not apply to, Fairtrade "small farmer cooperatives" though some have an average of 2.39 ha per farmer of just one crop, coffee, with some single farmers having more than 23 ha coffee, implying substantial use of hired labor.) In a hired labour situation, Fairtrade Standards require a "joint body" to be set up with representatives from both the management and the employees. This joint body decides on how Fairtrade Premiums will be spent to benefit plantation employees.

For some products, such as coffee, only Fairtrade Standards for small farmers' organizations are applicable. For others, such as tea, both small farmers' organizations and plantations can be certified.

Trade standards cover the payment of premiums, of minimum prices, where applicable, the provision of credit to buy the crop, and commercial relationships between the exporting cooperative or other organization and the importer.

Typically, in order for a product to be marked as "Fair-trade " at least 20% of its mass must be made up of a Fairtrade product.

Fairtrade Standards and procedures are approved by the Fairtrade International Standards Committee, an external committee comprising all FLO stakeholders (labeling initiatives, producers and traders) and external experts. Fairtrade Standards are set by FLO in accordance to the requirements of the ISEAL Code of Good Practice in standard setting and are in addition the result of a consultation process, involving a variety of stakeholders: producers, traders, external experts, inspectors, certification staff etc.

There are however criticisms of the private standards. There have been complaints that Fairtrade standards are inappropriate and may harm producers, sometimes imposing months of additional work for little return. There have also been complaints that standards set by a small committee of activists in the rich north have been imposed on poor farmers in the Global South. Fraser suggests that they are a rag bag of requirements imposed without thought of what is to be achieved or how.

== Fairtrade pricing ==
The main aspects of the Fairtrade system are the Minimum Price and the Premium. These are paid to the exporting firm, usually a second tier cooperative, not to the farmer. They are not paid for everything produced by the cooperative members, but for that proportion of their output they are able to sell with the brand 'Fairtrade Certified', typically 17% to as much as 60% of their turnover.

- The Fairtrade Premium is an extra payment over the market price (e.g. an extra 20c/lb for coffee) which is paid to the exporting organization. The residual after extra costs have been met must be spent on “social projects” for social and economic development in the producing communities, rather than being given to farmers as extra payment. The producers themselves decide how these funds are to be spent. They are generally used for improvements in health, education or other social facilities, although it may also be used for certain development projects to enable farmers to improve productivity or reduce their reliance on single commodities. As part of the Fairtrade criteria, registered producers are accountable to FLOCert for the use of this money.
- The Fairtrade Minimum Price is a guaranteed price to be paid for a few products like coffee when the world prices collapse. Again, it would usually be spent on "social projects" rather than going to the farmers.

There are complaints that the standards relating to paying of price premiums, minimum prices, provision of credit, etc. by importers in rich countries are not enforced. In particular importers can demand to get a higher quality at the same official Fairtrade price, or withhold other services, threatening to buy from another Fairtrade supplier if the exporter did not agree to this kickback, or if the supplier complains that a kickback is demanded. De Janvry, McIntosh and Sadoulet have quantified this for a large group of Fairtrade coffee cooperatives in South America over a dozen years. They found that this kickback was 10c a pound over a period when the official price premium was 5c or 10c a pound, and this, plus the certification fee, meant that the cooperatives made a loss in years when a premium was payable, and were paid substantially less than the official minimum prices in years when a minimum price was payable. These should have been identified and rectified by the certification agency.

== Fairtrade inspection and certification ==
Fairtrade inspection and certification are carried out, for a fee, by FLOCert, an independent, for profit, body created by Fairtrade International in 2004. FLO-CERT certifies that both producers and traders have met with Fairtrade Standards and that producers have invested any surplus received through Fairtrade in social projects.

FLO-CERT works with a network of around 100 independent inspectors that regularly visit producer and trade organizations and report back to FLO-CERT. All certification decisions are then taken by a Certification Committee, composed of stakeholders from producers, traders, national labelling organisations and external experts. An Appeals Committee handles all appeals.

FLO-CERT inspections and certification follow the international ISO standards for product certification bodies (ISO 65).

There have been claims that adherence to fair trade standards by producers has been poor and that enforcement of standards by Fairtrade is very weak, notably by Christian Jacquiau. and by Paola Ghillani, who spent four years as president of Fairtrade Labelling Organizations. There is criticism of poor enforcement: labourers on Fairtrade farms in Peru are paid less than the minimum wage; some non-Fairtrade coffee is sold as Fairtrade; "the standards are not very strict in the case of seasonally hired labour in coffee production"; "some fair trade standards are not strictly enforced"; and supermarkets may avoid their responsibility. In 2006, a Financial Times journalist found that ten out of the ten mills they visited had sold uncertified coffee to co-operatives as certified. It reported that they were "also handed evidence of at least one coffee association that received Fairtrade certification despite illegally growing some 20 per cent of its coffee in protected national forest land.

== Costs and returns ==
Fairtrade farmers and marketing organizations incur a wide range of costs in achieving and maintaining certification. They incur these costs on all their production, but they can only recover costs on the small part of their production that they can sell as "Fairtrade certified". In practice they can sell only small of their output as Fairtrade, because of lack of demand, and must sell the rest as uncertified at world prices. For example, there is not enough demand to take all the certified coffee produced, so most has to be sold as uncertified. In 2001 only 13.6% could be sold as certified so limits were placed on new cooperatives joining the scheme. This plus an increased demand put up sales of certified to around 50% in 2003 with a figure of 37% commonly cited in recent years. Some exporting cooperatives do not manage to sell any of their output as certified, and others sell as little as 8%. Weber reports cooperatives not able to cover the extra costs of a marketing team for Fairtrade, with one covering only 70% of these costs after six years of Fairtrade membership.

Certified organizations such as cooperatives have to pay FLOCert a fee to become certified and a further annual fee for audit and continued certification Fairtrade inspection and certification are carried out, for a fee. The first year certification fee per unit sold as "Fairtrade certified" varies but has been over 6c/lb with an annual fee of 3c/lb to 3.4c/b for coffee up to 2006 in some countries, at a time when the "Fairtrade premium" was 5c to 10c/lb.

The cooperative or other certified organization has to spend money on conforming to the private standards, with changed employment practices, the introduction and administration of the required democratic processes, changed processing, labelling and packing, changed material. They also incur extra costs in selling: . Weber reports cooperatives not able to cover the extra costs of a marketing team for Fairtrade, with one covering only 70% of these costs after six years of Fairtrade membership.

It is generally agreed that some organizations make a loss from their Fair trade certification, but there are very few economic studies showing what happened to the money.

Fairtrade farmers also have to meet a large range of criteria on production: there are limits on using child labour, pesticides, herbicides, genetically modified products etc. These cost money, mean that the farmers have to do more work in the hot sun, and that they have to hire labour instead of using family labour. In times when world prices are so low that there is no “social premium” and the minimum price is paid, some farmers have negotiated that some of the money is paid to them, rather than being used for social projects.

== History ==
Fairtrade labelled coffee, the first Fairtrade labelled product, was first launched in the Netherlands in 1988. The label, launched by Nico Roozen and Dutch missionary Frans van der Hoff, was then called Max Havelaar after a fictional Dutch character who opposed the exploitation of coffee pickers in Dutch colonies. Fairtrade labelling allowed Fairtrade Certified goods to be sold outside the World shops for the first time and into mainstream retailers, reaching a larger consumer segment and boosting sales significantly.

The concept caught on: in the ensuing years, similar non-profit Fairtrade labelling organizations were set up in other European countries and North America, called “Max Havelaar” (in Belgium, Switzerland, Denmark, Norway and France), "Transfair" (in Germany, Luxembourg, Austria, Italy, the United States, Canada and Japan), or carrying a national name: “Fairtrade Mark” in the UK and Ireland, "Rättvisemärkt" in Sweden, and "Reilu Kauppa" in Finland. Initially, the Max Havelaars and the Transfairs each had their own Fairtrade standards, product committees and monitoring systems. In 1994, a process of convergence among the labelling organizations – or "LIs" (for "Labelling Initiatives") – started with the establishment of a TransMax working group, culminating in 1997 in the creation of Fairtrade Labelling Organizations International, now known simply as Fairtrade International (FLO). FLO is an umbrella organization whose mission is to set the Fairtrade Standards, support, inspect and certify disadvantaged producers and harmonize the Fairtrade message across the movement.

In 2002, FLO launched a new Fairtrade Certification Mark. The goals of the launch were to improve the visibility of the Mark on supermarket shelves, convey a dynamic, forward-looking image for Fairtrade, facilitate cross border trade and simplify procedures for importers and traders.

The Fairtrade Mark harmonization process is still under way – as of March 2011, all but two labelling initiatives (TransFair USA and TransFair Canada) have fully adopted the new international Certification Mark. These two organizations currently use the Fair Trade Certified Mark, however Canadian organization began actively promoting the new international Certification Mark in 2010 as part of a total transition toward it. TransFair USA has apparently elected to continue with its own mark for the time being.

At present, over 19 FLO Member Labelling Initiatives are using the International Fairtrade Certification Mark. There are now Fairtrade Certification Marks on dozens of different products, based on FLO’s certification for coffee, tea, rice, bananas, mangoes, cocoa, cotton, sugar, honey, fruit juices, nuts, fresh fruit, quinoa, herbs and spices, wine and footballs etc.

== Criticism ==
According to the economist Bruce Wydick with the median coffee drinker willing to pay a premium of 50 cents for a cup of fair-trade coffee even in the best-case scenario for fair trade, when world prices are at their lowest, the maximum amount a fair-trade grower from that same cup of coffee would receive is only one third of a cent Wydick lists his points against the alleged benefits of fair trade:

- The flawed design of the system undermines its own benefits: zero benefits in the long run.
- For certification Fair trade imposes significant costs on impoverished growers
- Fair trade attracts bad beans by making growers dump their bad beans into fair-trade channels.
- Costs to growers imposed by restrictions on fertilizers and other inputs diminish yields.
- Fair trade doesn’t help the poorest growers.
- Relatively little fair-trade coffee originates from the poorest countries.
- Purported social investments of the fair-trade system lack transparency.
- The fair-trade system is inefficient at transferring coffee consumers’ goodwill to producers.
- Direct trade is probably more efficient and sustainable than fair trade.
- Artificially stimulating more coffee production keeps coffee growers poor, because overproduction makes the prices fall on the world markets.
- Fair-trade coffee fails to address the root of poverty issues which aren't payment of producers but social, political and educational conditions.
- Among the 16 best methods to fight poverty fair trade was the second but last with regard to cost efficiency.

According to Colleen Haight from San Jose State University is in the fact that Fairtrade doesn't buy the complete production of a producer, making him sell his better products on the free market and passing on his lower quality goods to the fairtrade channel.
