= Fairtrade Ireland =

- Company type: Non-profit organisation
- Founded: 1992; 34 years ago
- Headquarters: Dublin, Ireland
- Key people: Peter Gaynor, Executive Director
- Website: www.fairtrade.ie/

Fairtrade Ireland is the Irish member of FLO International, which unites 23 Fairtrade producer and labelling initiatives across Europe, Asia, Latin America, North America, Africa, Australia and New Zealand.

The organisation, which is registered as a charity, awards a consumer label, the Fairtrade Certification Mark, to products which meet internationally recognised standards of Fairtrade. It is supported by Amnesty International, ActionAid Ireland, Christian Aid, Comhlámh, Concern, Oxfam, Trócaire and the Irish Congress of Trade Unions and is active throughout Ireland through a network of volunteers.

The first Irish product bearing the Fairtrade Mark, Bewley's Direct coffee, was launched in November 1996. Today, dozens of Irish products bear the Fairtrade Mark, and Fairtrade products are sold by most major Irish supermarkets, such as Tesco, Dunnes Stores, Londis, Marks & Spencer, Superquinn, Supervalu, Centra, and Spar.

Fairtrade Ireland's most active campaign is the Fairtrade Town programme. As of 2017, there were 49 registered Fairtrade Towns in Ireland. Fairtrade Ireland also runs the Fairtrade Schools, Fairtrade College, Fairtrade Ambassador, and Fairtrade@Work programs throughout Ireland

Sales of Fairtrade products in Ireland jumped by 101 per cent in 2007 to more than €23.3 million, up from €11.6 million in 2006.

A survey conducted in 2011 found that 88% of Irish adults trust the Fairtrade Certification Mark.
