= Fair Trade Certified Mark =

The Fair Trade Certified Mark is a fair trade certification mark used primarily in the United States and Canada. It appears on products as an independent guarantee that disadvantaged producers in the developing world are getting a better deal. The Fair Trade Certified Mark is the North American equivalent of the International Fairtrade Certification Mark used in Europe, Africa, Asia, Australia and New Zealand.

For a product to carry either Certification Marks, it must come from Fair Trade USA inspected and certified producer organizations. The crops must be grown and harvested in accordance with the fair trade standards set by Fair Trade USA. Some of the supply chains are also monitored by FLOCERT to ensure the integrity of labelled products. Only Fair Trade USA (formerly "TransFair USA") licensees can use the Fair Trade Certified Mark on their products.

The Fair Trade Certified Mark in the United States was introduced by TransFair USA on the American market in 1998.

In 2012 a variation of the US Fair Trade certification mark was adopted with the benefit of being registered globally as a trade mark. The mark is designed to pop better on the shelf through a far simpler design and the use of color. The one basket with outstretched hands indicates sharing and a "give and take" between producers and purchases. The green signals the environmental strength of Fair Trade.
