= Fair-trade certification =

Product certification within the "fair trade" movement

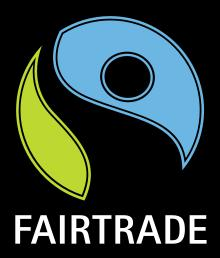
Certification logo of Fairtrade International

A fair-trade certification is a product certification within the market-based movement of fair trade. The most widely used fair-trade certification is FLO International's, the International Fairtrade Certification Mark, used in Europe, Africa, Asia, Australia and New Zealand. Fair Trade Certified Mark is the North American equivalent of the International Fairtrade Certification Mark. As of January 2011, there were more than 1,000 companies certified by FLO International's certification and a further 1,000 or so certified by other ethical and fairtrade certification schemes around the world.

The Fairtrade International certification system covers a wide range of products, including banana, coffee, cocoa, cotton, cane sugar, flowers and plants, honey, dried fruit, fruit juices, herbs, spices, tea, nuts and vegetables.

== How it works ==
Fair trade is a strategy for poverty alleviation and sustainable development. It aims to create greater equity in the international trading system. It creates social and economic opportunities through trading partnerships with marginalised farmers and craftspeople in developing countries so that more customers are accessible to their products and they receive a favorable deal. In return, the producers must comply with the standards set by the certifying authority.

Packers in developed countries pay a fee to the Fairtrade organisation for the right to use the Fairtrade certification logo. Importers of Fairtrade-certified products must pay exporters a price higher than the market price for non-Fairtrade–certified products to cover additional costs borne by Fairtrade-certified firms in marketing and inspection. Any surplus after paying these costs must be used for local social, environmental, and economic projects.

== Fairtrade standards ==
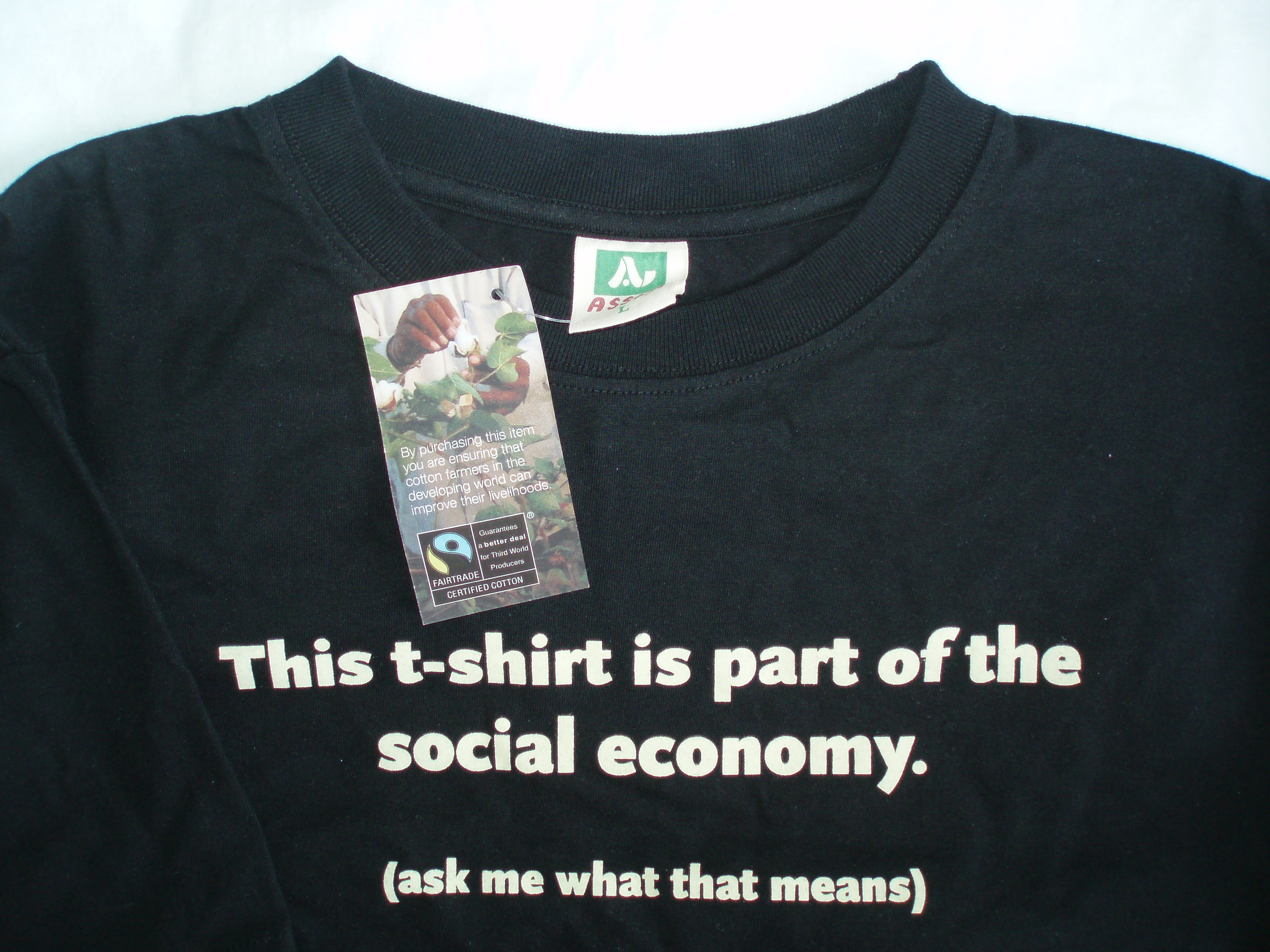
A T-shirt made from Fairtrade-certified cotton

Fairtrade develops private standards that aid the sustainable development of some smaller producers and agricultural workers in third world countries. In order to become certified Fairtrade producers, the cooperatives and their farmers have to comply with private standards set by Fairtrade International. FLOCERT inspects and certifies producer organizations in more than 70 countries in Europe, Asia, Africa, and Latin America.

The standards set for different stakeholders are as follows:

=== Small producer organizations ===
- The majority of the members of the organization must be small-scale producers who do not highly depend on hired workers, but run their farms mainly by their own effort.
- Profits earned must be equally distributed among the producers.
- Every member in the organisation should have the right to vote in the decision-making process.

=== Hired labour ===
- Workers have the right to join an independent union to collectively bargain their working conditions.
- Forced labour and child labour are prohibited.
- Working conditions have to be equitable for all workers. Salaries must be at least equal to or higher than the minimum wage in effect.
- Safety and health measures must be implemented properly so as to avoid injuries at work.

=== Trade standards ===
- Buyers pay a price no lower than the Fairtrade Minimum Price in order to cover the costs of sustainable production.
- Buyers pay an additional amount of money that allows producers to invest in development (the Fairtrade Premium).
- Buyers sign contracts that assist long-term planning and sustainable production practices.

== Fairtrade pricing ==
The Fairtrade system consists of two types of pricing: the Minimum Price and the Premium. These are paid to the exporters according to the proportion of output companies are able to sell with the brand "Fairtrade Certified", typically ranging from 17% to 60% of their turnover.

- The Fairtrade Minimum Price is the price that must be paid by buyers to Fairtrade-certified producers. It is a floor price that covers producers' average cost of production, protecting producers from selling their products underpriced.
- The Fairtrade Premium is a sum of money which is paid in addition to the payment for the products. It must be invested in the producers' business, livelihood and the socio-economic development of the workers. The producers have the largest power deciding how these funds are to be spent.

== How fairtrade measures its impact ==
The Fairtrade system committed to a programme of Monitoring, Evaluation and Learning (MEL), which aims at generating recommendations and analysis in support of greater effectiveness and impact. Ongoing market progress is monitored by market-facing organizations present in countries where Fairtrade-certified products are sold; market data is consolidated by Fairtrade International on an annual basis. These data form a basis for understanding the dynamics of how certification is developing, and how the impacts of Fairtrade are being distributed between producer organizations, geographies and products.

Fairtrade's governance bodies also review key results and evaluate regularly in order to improve strategy and decision-making. These results are publicised within the Fairtrade system and among relevant stakeholders for further discussion of findings and recommendations.

== Criticisms ==
=== Little money reaches the farmers ===
The Fairtrade Foundation does not monitor how much of the premium paid to exporters reaches farmers. As the cooperatives incur heavy fees on inspection, certification and marketing, only a small amount of money is retained for the farmers. In general, Fairtrade producers are only able to sell 18% to 37% of their output as Fairtrade-certified while the rest is sold as uncertified at market prices.

=== Fairtrade helps the rich to a larger extent ===
Fair trade is profitable for traders in rich countries rather than those in poor countries. In order to qualify as Fairtrade producers, cooperatives must meet the strict standards set by certifiers which implies that their constituent farmers must be quite skillful and educated. However, these farmers are predominantly from the poorest countries and lack the leverage to bargain with the cooperatives. Corruption even occurs in some cases.

=== Inefficient marketing system ===
Fairtrade-certified products sold through a monopsonist cooperative may be inefficient and prone to corruption. Fairtrade farmers should have the right to choose the buyer who offers the best price, or switch when their cooperatives are going bankrupt. A monopsonist cooperative in charge of Fairtrade certification may try to grow the fair-trade industry for profit and not so much for the lives of the small farmers. At this point they are trying to increase the supply of fair trade when the supply is already far beyond the demand.

=== Not fit for purpose ===
Concerns around Fairtrade certification were raised by the Institute for Multi-Stakeholder Initiative Integrity, with conclusions from their "Not Fit for Purpose" report that private sector led multi-stakeholder initiatives adopt weak or narrow standards that better serve corporate interests than rights holder interests. Fairtrade responded to explain private standards are no substitute for public regulation.

== Other certification and product labelings ==
- The Fair Trade Federation does not certify individual products, but instead evaluates an entire business.
- The FTO Mark, launched in 2004 by the World Fair Trade Organization, identifies registered fair-trade organizations.
- UTZ Certified is a coffee certification program that has sometimes been dubbed "Fairtrade lite".
- Counter Culture Direct Trade Certification is a direct trade alternative to the Fairtrade certification.
- Whole Trade Guarantee, a purchasing initiative launched in 2007 by Whole Foods Market.

== See also ==
- Blue Angel (certification)
- Carbon emission label
- Carbon Trust
- Certified wood
- Community-based monitoring
- Ecolabel
- Eco-Management and Audit Scheme
- Energy input labeling
- Energy rating label
- Ethical consumerism
- Ethical eating
- Ethical trade
- EU Ecolabel
- Fair Trade Certified Mark
- Fair-trade cocoa
- Fair-trade coffee
- Fair Trade USA
- Farm assurance
- Free range
- Friend of the Sea
- Global Ecolabelling Network
- Green brands
- Green consumption
- ISO 14000 family
- Mandatory labelling
- NSF International
- Organic certification
- Standards of identity for food
- Sustainable consumer behaviour
- Sustainable consumption
- Sustainable packaging
- Sustainable seafood advisory lists and certification
- Vegetarian and vegan symbolism
