= Stichting Max Havelaar =

Dutch member of Fairtrade International

Fairtrade Nederland
- Type: Non-profit organization
- Founded: 1988; 38 years ago
- Headquarters: Utrecht, Netherlands
- Key people: Peter d'Angremond, Director since July 2009
- Website: www.fairtradenederland.nl

Fairtrade Nederland, formerly known as Max Havelaar, is the Dutch member of Fairtrade International, which unites 23 Fairtrade certification producer and labelling initiatives across Europe, Asia, Latin America, North America, Africa, Australia and New Zealand.

The Fairtrade label, the world's first Fairtrade Certification Mark, was officially launched by Stichting Max Havelaar on 15 November 1988, under the efforts of Nico Roozen, Frans van der Hoff and Dutch ecumenical development agency Solidaridad. The label, used to distinguish Fairtrade products from conventional ones, aims to improve "the living and working conditions of small farmers and agricultural workers in disadvantaged regions". The first fairly traded coffee originated from the UCIRI cooperative in Mexico and was imported by Dutch company Van Weely, roasted by Neuteboom, before being sold directly to worldshops and, for the first time, to mainstream retailers across the Netherlands.

Today, Fairtrade products are available in many shops throughout Europe, i.e. in the Dutch supermarket chains such as Jumbo, which sells an average of 18 Fairtrade products per store and Super de Boer, which sells an average of 17 products per store. Fairtrade products are also available at Albert Heijn supermarkets across the Netherlands and online at MUD Jeans, the Dutch fair trade certified denim brand.

In 2006, Fairtrade labelled sales in the Netherlands amounted to €41 million, a 12% year-to-year increase.

It was named after Max Havelaar, a character in a Dutch 19th-century novel critical of Dutch colonialism in the Dutch East Indies.

== Court case against the province of Groningen ==
The Dutch province of Groningen was sued in 2007 by Dutch coffee supplier Douwe Egberts for explicitly requiring its coffee suppliers to meet fair trade criteria set by Stichting Max Havelaar, most notably the payment of a minimum price and a development premium to producer cooperatives. Douwe Egberts, which sells a number of coffee brands under self-developed ethical criteria, believed the requirements were discriminatory. After several months of discussions and legal challenges, the province of Groningen prevailed in a well-publicized judgement in favor of the province. Coen de Ruiter, director of Stichting Max Havelaar, called the victory a landmark event: "it provides governmental institutions the freedom in their purchasing policy to require suppliers to provide coffee that bears the fair trade criteria, so that a substantial and meaningful contribution is made in the fight against poverty through the daily cup of coffee".
