= Association Max Havelaar France =

- Company type: Non-profit organization
- Founded: 1992; 34 years ago
- Headquarters: Montreuil, France
- Key people: Joaquin Munoz, Director
- Number of employees: ~36 (2006)
- Website: www.maxhavelaarfrance.org

Association Max Havelaar France is the French member of FLO International, which unites 23 Fairtrade producer and labelling initiatives across Europe, Asia, Latin America, North America, Africa, Australia and New Zealand.

The organisation is named after Max Havelaar, which is both the title and the main character of a Dutch 19th-century novel (written by Multatuli) critical of Dutch colonialism in the Dutch East Indies.

Association Max Havelaar France was established in 1992 by ISF (Ingénieurs Sans Frontières), Peuples Solidaires and CICDA (Centre International de Coopération pour le Développement Agricole). The first Max Havelaar labelled products appeared in 1993 in Brittany.

The organization, registered as a non-profit organization, promotes the sale of Fairtrade labelled products in France. It organizes several promotional events every year, such as the Quinzaine du Commerce Équitable (which typically runs in May), the French counterpart of the Fairtrade Foundation's Fairtrade fortnight. Association Max Havelaar France is also an active participant in the Semaine de la Solidarité Internationale, which runs in November.

Association Max Havelaar France is supported by the French Ministry of Foreign Affairs and the European Commission. Through labelled Fairtrade, Association Max Havelaar France aims to:

- Offer disadvantaged producers and workers a fair wage, allowing them to satisfy their basic needs.
- Guarantee producer and worker rights (ban of child labor, slavery, forced labor etc.)
- Develop and promote sustainable relationships throughout the supply chain.
- Promote environmental protection.
- Offer consumers quality products.

The organization is today a member of the Plate-forme Française pour le commerce équitable, the CRID (Centre de recherche et d’information pour le développement ), the Coordination SUD (Solidarité Urgence Développement) and the Comité 21 de la Plate-forme pour des agricultures durables et solidaires.

In 2006, the average French spent €2,80 on Fairtrade products, up from €2,00 in 2005. The French Fairtrade market, was evaluated the same year at €166 million, representing approximately 10% of the global total.

As per April 2007, Association Max Havelaar France worked with over 158 licensees offering over 1555 Fairtrade products in France. Over 125 Fairtrade producer organizations, representing approximately a quarter million disadvantaged producers, sold their products on the French Fairtrade market.
