= Fair Trading Act =

Fair Trading Act may refer to:

- Fair Trading Act 1973, in the United Kingdom
- Fair Trading Act 1986, in New Zealand

== See also ==
- Fair trading (disambiguation)
