= Paul Rice =

American businessman

- Education: Yale (BA, Economics and Political Science) | University of California, Berkeley - Haas School of Business (MBA)
- Occupations: Founder and CEO of Fair Trade USA
- Honours: Social Capitalist of the Year, Fast Company (2005-2008)

Paul Rice is the Founder & CEO of Fair Trade USA, the leading third-party certifier of Fair Trade products in North America. Since launching Fair Trade USA (formally called TransFair) in 1998, Rice has brought Fair Trade into the mainstream and built a movement to expand its impact. He has challenged and collaborated with hundreds of companies to rework their global supply chains to obtain high-quality products that support community development and environmental protection.

Rice's work as a social entrepreneur enabled 1 million farming families to receive a price change for their crops to compete in the global marketplace through direct, long-term contracts with international buyers. Fair Trade Certified Products are available in over 200,000 retail locations and are considered to be a reputable mark of sourcing in North America.

Rice has been criticized in recent years for his decision to resign Fair Trade USA's membership from Fairtrade Labeling Organization (FLO), the international fair trade labeling organization. While he argues that the split was necessary for expansion, some critics worry that scaling Fair Trade will dilute its impact. Rice is committed to expanding Fair Trade to impoverished laborers, whether or not they work on a cooperative through his “Fair Trade for All” platform.

== Early life and education ==
Rice was raised in Dallas and Austin, Texas, the son of a single mother. He graduated from St. Mark's School of Texas.

He was an entrepreneurial boy, selling newspapers, mowing lawns, and gardening in his community. By saving his earnings, Rice was able to self-finance most of his college tuition at Yale University, where he enrolled in 1978.

At Yale, Rice studied Political Science and Economics, which sparked an interest in the issues of global hunger, poverty, and underdevelopment, particularly as they related to rural farming. At nineteen, he took a year off from school and went to China to learn about land reform and the peasants' struggle to organize cooperatives. This experience cemented his decision to enter the field of international development after graduating in 1983. Upon graduation, he spent eleven years working with agricultural farmers in Nicaragua, before returning to the US for a graduate degree. In 1990 Paul founded PRODECOOP, which became one of the largest organic coffee exporters in the world. After training the next CEO, Paul returned to the states in 1994, to earn a Master's of Business Administration at the UC Berkeley Haas School of Business. During his time there he developed the Business plan for TransFair or otherwise today known as Fair Trade USA.

== Career ==
=== Rural Development Specialist ===
After college, Rice bought a one-way ticket to Nicaragua to work with smallholder farmers, thinking he would stay only one year. As it turned out, Nicaragua became home to Rice for 11 years. There, he became a specialist in rural economic and cooperative development. Traveling throughout the country, he helped hundreds of smallholder farmers organize cooperatives.

=== PRODECOOP ===
In 1990, still in Nicaragua, Rice founded PRODECOOP, the country's first Fair Trade, organic coffee export cooperative. Within three years, the coop grew from 24 families to over 3,000. Through the cooperative, these farmers got direct access to the global market and received higher compensation for their work. The additional income enabled them to improve the quality of life in their entire community. Throughout this experience, Rice became convinced that the market—rather than foreign aid—was the most sustainable mode of poverty alleviation.

After veing CEO of PRODECOOP for four years, Rice transitioned leadership to a native woman who was the first female to lead a coffee company in the male-dominated Nicaraguan coffee industry. PRODECOOP is now led by General Manager Merling Preza who is an advocate for the cooperative model, fair trade and sustainability for coffee families around the world.

Subsequently, Rice was strategy consultant and development advisor to 22 cooperative enterprises throughout Latin America and Asia, helping them become more competitive, democratic, and self-reliant. His years of first-hand experience abroad in the areas of global supply chain transparency, social auditing, sustainable agriculture, and cooperative enterprise development led him to found Fair Trade USA.

=== Fair Trade USA ===
After 11 years working with cooperatives, Rice returned to the US to expand the market for Fair Trade goods. The products would be certified as Fair Trade by his start-up, Fair Trade USA. Rice opened the first "national headquarters”—a one-room office in a converted warehouse in downtown Oakland—in late 1998. He started off working with just a handful of mission-driven coffee companies. After gaining traction with coffee, Rice expanded the certification across new product categories, including fresh produce, spices, and cotton.

Since the launch of the Fair Trade Certified™ label in 1998, Paul has helped establish Fair Trade as one of the fastest growing segments of the food and apparel industries. To date, Fair Trade USA has partnered with over 1,500 major companies, including Green Mountain, Nespresso, Whole Foods, Costco, Sam's Club, Walmart, Kroger, and Target. Fair Trade USA now certifies coffee, tea, cocoa, sugar, coconut, fresh produce, and seafood. Recently, through groundbreaking partnerships with Patagonia, Athleta, Williams-Sonoma and J. Crew, Fair Trade has begun certifying apparel and home goods, improving the lives of factory workers.

In 2022, consumer recognition of the Fair Trade Certified label hit 65%. To date, Fair Trade USA and its partners have generated over $1 billion in additional income for farmers and workers in 51 countries, allowing them to care for the environment and steadily improve their livelihoods. By offering these individuals the opportunity to earn a livable wage, Fair Trade USA has helps them fund a range of community development projects, including water sanitation, health, and education programs.

In 2011, Rice came under fire for his decision to resign Fair Trade USA's membership from the Fair Trade Labeling Organization (FLO), the international fair trade labeling organization. While FLO only certifies small cooperatives (in coffee), he wanted to expand certification to farm workers and independent smallholders that were previously excluded from Fair Trade. The move was controversial, given Fair Trade's tradition of working with small scale farmers. After the split, Fair Trade USA launched the “Fair Trade of All” campaign, an agenda for doubling the impact of Fair Trade and including more people in its benefits.

== Honors and awards ==
He has received numerous honors and awards for his pioneering work as a social entrepreneur in the Fair Trade movement, including:

- In 2000, he received the prestigious international Ashoka Fellowship for social Entrepreneurship.
- In 2001, he was recognized by the AVINA Foundation for his “Leadership for Change”.
- Rice was honored by the Klaus Schwab Foundation for Social Entrepreneurship and the World Economic Forum as one of the world's top 40 Social Entrepreneurs in 2002.
- Fast Company magazine named Rice “Social Capitalist of the Year” four years in a row (2005-2008).
- In 2005, he received the prestigious Skoll Award for Social Entrepreneurship.
- He was a Finalist for Entrepreneur Magazine's Entrepreneur of 2012.
- Ethical Corporation's 2019 Business Leader of the Year.
- Berkeley Haas 2019 Leading Through Innovation Award.

== Speaking ==
Rice has become a distinguished speaker and leader in economic development, social enterprise, and corporate responsibility. Some of his engagements include:

- Since 2004, he has spoken on Fair Trade at the World Economic Forum in Davos, Switzerland.
- In 2009, spoke about his new commitment to Rwandan coffee farmers at the Clinton Global Initiative.
- In 2011, he delivered a TED-x speech on the conscious consumption movement at the Ashoka U Exchange at Duke.
- In 2012, he delivered the keynote address at the Igniting Innovation Summit at Harvard.
- In 2012, he spoke The African Network conference on seizing entrepreneurial opportunities in San Jose, California.
- In 2015, he spoke at the Conscious Leadership and Innovation Speaker Series at the University of San Francisco School of Management.
- In 2018, he delivered UC Berkeley's Haas MBA Commencement Speech.

== See also ==
- Notable alumni of St. Mark's School of Texas
