= Fair trading =

Fair trading may refer to:

- Fair Trading Act (disambiguation)
- NSW Fair Trading, a division of the Department of Customer Service of the New South Wales state government

== See also ==
- Consumer protection
- Fair trade (disambiguation)
