= Nico Roozen =

Dutch economist (born 1953)

Nicolaas Josephus Maria "Nico" Roozen (born 22 April 1953 in Heemskerk) is a Dutch economist who, in collaboration with Frans van der Hoff and ecumenical development agency Solidaridad, launched Max Havelaar, the first Fairtrade certification initiative in 1988. Roozen played a key role in convincing several major Dutch retailers to offer Fairtrade goods, which later led to the commercial success of Fairtrade certification. On October 25, 2007, Nico Roozen was invested as an Officer of the Order of Orange Nassau for his years of dedication to Fairtrade.

In 1996, Roozen launched AgroFair, the first Fairtrade fruit company in Europe.

Until 2019, Nico Roozen was the executive director of the development agency Solidaridad. Currently, he is honorary president of the same organization.

== See also ==
- Fairtrade certification
