= Frans van der Hoff =

Dutch missionary (1939–2024)

Frans van der Hoff (16 July 1939 – 13 February 2024), or Francisco VanderHoff Boersma as he is called in Latin America, was a Dutch missionary who, in collaboration with Nico Roozen and ecumenical development agency Solidaridad, launched Max Havelaar, the first Fairtrade label in 1988. Van der Hoff's contacts with Mexican coffee producers were important in securing the supply and ensuring the success of the very first Fairtrade certification initiative.

== Biography ==
Van der Hoff was born on 16 July 1939, as the seventh of seventeen children to a disciplined farming family, van der Hoff-Boersma, that had moved from Friesland to the village De Rips in the southern Netherlands. He became politically active early on in student movements during his studies at Radboud University Nijmegen. He later received a Ph.D. in political economy and another in theology while studying in Germany. In 1970, van der Hoff moved to Santiago de Chile to work in the barrios as a worker-priest. During the 1973 coup, he moved to Mexico to continue his work in the slums of Mexico City. Seven years later, he moved to Oaxaca in the Southern part of Mexico. In 1981, he participated in UCIRI's launch (Union de Comunidades Indigenas de la Region del Istmo), a coffee producer cooperative created to bypass local traders (also called coyotes) and pool resources.

In 1985, van der Hoff met Roozen at the Utrecht train station through a mutual friend. Roozen, who was then responsible for business development at ecumenical development agency Solidaridad, quickly became interested in van der Hoff's work. On 15 November 1988, the two started the first Fairtrade labelling initiative, Max Havelaar. The initiative offered disadvantaged coffee producers following various social and environmental standards a fair price—significantly above the market price—for their crop. The coffee, originating from the UCIRI cooperative, was imported by Dutch company Van Weely, roasted by Neuteboom, and then sold directly to world shops and retailers across the Netherlands. The initiative was a great success and was replicated in several other markets.

In 2006, Fairtrade-certified sales amounted to approximately €1.6 billion worldwide and over 569 producer organizations, representing roughly over 1.5 million producers, in 58 developing countries were Fairtrade certified.

Van der Hoff died in Ixtepec, Oaxaca on 13 February 2024, at the age of 84.

== Awards ==
Van der Hoff was named Chevalier of the Legion of Honor by French president Chirac in 2005.

Van der Hoff was awarded the 2006 North-South Prize by the Council of Europe. He was also appointed Commander in the Order of the Crown (Belgium) by the Belgian Minister of Development Cooperation, received an honorary doctorate from the Catholic University of Louvain in Belgium for his efforts to establish a "different economy", and was awarded the Groeneveldprize from the Groeneveld Foundation in the Netherlands for his special efforts for preservation of the environment in the same year.

== See also ==
- Fairtrade certification
