= Fair Trade USA =

- Type: Non-profit organization
- Industry: Product certification
- Founded: 1998; 28 years ago
- Headquarters: Oakland, California, United States
- Key people: Paul Rice, President and CEO; Ron D. Cordes, Chairman of the Board
- Number of employees: ~130 (2019)
- Website: www.fairtradeusa.org

Fair Trade USA, formerly "TransFair USA", is a 501(c)(3) non-profit organization that sets standards, certifies, and labels products that promote sustainable livelihoods for farmers and workers and protect the environment.

== About ==
Founded in 1998 by the Institute for Agricultural Trade Policy (IATP), Fair Trade USA is an independent, nonprofit organization that sets standards, certifies, and labels products that promote sustainable livelihoods for farmers and workers and protect the environment.

== Growth in fair trade ==
Although coffee remains the most popular fair trade product, Fair Trade USA certifies a variety of product categories, including tea, cocoa, sugar, spices, honey, produce, grains, wine and spirits, flowers, apparel and home goods, and body care. There are more than 12,000 individual Fair Trade Certified products available in North America, and the market is growing rapidly.

== Campaigns ==
Comedian Jimmy Fallon kicked off Fair Trade Month by hosting ice cream makers Ben & Jerry on the Late Night with Jimmy Fallon. The October 4, 2011, episode mentioned the March episode in which Ben Cohen and Jerry Greenfield introduced their new flavor featuring Fair Trade Certified ingredients, Late Night Snack. Introducing the ice cream flavor, which is made with Fair Trade Certified vanilla and cocoa, gave Ben and Jerry the opportunity to discuss Fair Trade and the company's goal to use entirely Fair Trade Certified ingredients by 2013.

Green Mountain Coffee partnered with musical groups Michael Franti & Spearhead and Grace Potter and the Nocturnals to broadcast live concerts promoting Fair Trade. Both concerts were streamed on the Green Mountain Coffee Facebook page. Green Mountain Coffee was recognized in September 2011 as the world's largest purchaser of Fair Trade Certified coffee, having bought 26 million pounds during 2010.

Also in 2011, pastry chef Malika Ameen of Top Chef: Just Desserts Season 1 joined celebrity dietician Ashley Koff to create three dishes using Fair Trade Certified ingredients for a live Ustream broadcast during Fair Trade Month. The episode was called "Every Meal Matters" and consisted of a live cooking demonstration using Fair Trade Certified honey, vanilla extract, ground cinnamon, ground cardamom, bananas, mangos, pineapples, quinoa, natural cane sugar, coffee, chocolate, and brown sugar.

== Criticisms ==
There have been very few attempts at Fair trade impact studies. Griffiths (2011) argues that few of these attempts meet the normal standards for an impact study, such as comparing the before and after situation, having meaningful control groups, allowing for the fact that fair trade recruits farmers who are already better off, allowing for the fact that a fair trade cooperative receives aid from a dozen other organizations – Government Departments, Aid Agencies, donor countries, and NGOs, and allowing for the fact that fair trade may harm other farmers. Serious methodological problems arise in sampling, in comparing prices, and from the fact that the social projects of fair trade do not usually aim to produce economic benefits.

Fair trade supporters boast of 'the honeypot effect' – that cooperatives which become fair trade members then attract additional aid from other NGO charities, government and international donors as a result of their membership. Typically there are now six to twelve other donors. Critics point out that this inevitably means that resources are being removed from other, poorer, farmers. It also makes it impossible to argue that any positive or negative changes in the living standards of farmers are due to Fairtrade rather than to one of the other donors.

Booth says that the selling techniques used by some sellers and some supporters of Fairtrade are bullying, misleading and unethical. There are problems with the use of boycott campaigns and other pressure to force sellers to stock a product they think ethically suspect. Some people argue that these practices are justifiable: that strategic use of labeling may help embarrass (or encourage) major suppliers into changing their practices. They may make transparent corporate vulnerabilities that activists can exploit. Or they may encourage ordinary people to get involved with broader projects of social change.

There are complaints that the standards are inappropriate and may harm producers, sometimes imposing months of additional work for little return.

There have been claims that adherence to fair trade standards by producers has been poor and that enforcement of standards by Fairtrade is very weak, notably by Christian Jacquiau and by Paola Ghillani, who spent four years as president of Fairtrade Labelling Organizations There are many complaints of poor enforcement problems: labourers on fair trade farms in Peru are paid less than the minimum wage; some non-Fairtrade coffee is sold as Fairtrade 'the standards are not very strict in the case of seasonally hired labour in coffee production.' 'some fair trade standards are not strictly enforced' supermarkets avoid their responsibility. In 2006, a Financial Times journalist found that ten out of ten mills visited had sold uncertified coffee to co-operatives as certified. It reported that "The FT was also handed evidence of at least one coffee association that received fair trade certification despite illegally growing some 20 per cent of its coffee in protected national forest land. A lot of volunteers do unpaid work for firms, or market fair trade in schools, universities, local governments or parliament. Crane and Davies' study shows that distributors in developed countries make 'considerable use of unpaid volunteer workers for routine tasks, many of whom seemed to be under the (false) impression that they were helping out a charity.' Other critics in the Fair trade debate claim that the volunteers cannot know what fair trade does achieve and what harm it does, because the information is concealed from them.

Segments of the trade justice movement have also criticized fair trade in the past years for allegedly focusing too much on individual small producer groups while stopping short of advocating immediate trade policy changes that would have a larger impact on disadvantaged producers' lives. French author and RFI correspondent Jean-Pierre Boris championed this view in his 2005 book Commerce inéquitable.

There have been largely political criticisms of fair trade, both from the left and the right. Some believe the fair trade system is not radical enough. French author Christian Jacquiau, in his book Les coulisses du commerce équitable, calls for stricter fair trade standards and criticizes the fair trade movement for working within the current system (i.e. partnerships with mass retailers, multinational corporations etc.) rather than establishing a new fairer, fully autonomous trading system. Jacquiau is also a staunch supporter of significantly higher fair trade prices in order to maximize the impact, as most producers only sell a portion of their crop under fair trade terms. It has been argued that the approach of the fair trade system is too rooted in a Northern consumerist view of justice which Southern producers do not participate in setting. "A key issue is therefore to make explicit who possesses the power to define the terms of fair trade, that is who possesses the power to determine the need of an ethic in the first instance, and subsequently command a particular ethical vision as the truth." Some of the criticisms of fair trade from the free market approach to economics appear to be linked to right wing political approaches, but this does not mean that their analysis in this particular case is unacceptable to mainstream economists.
