= UTZ Certified =

Program and label for sustainable farming

- Company type: Non-profit organization
- Industry: Product certification, sustainability
- Founded: Amsterdam, The Netherlands (2002)
- Headquarters: Amsterdam, Netherlands
- Key people: Han de Groot, Executive Director
- Number of employees: 400+ (2019)

UTZ, formerly called UTZ Certified, is a program and a label for sustainable farming. The organization was founded as a non-profit in the Netherlands in 2002. The UTZ label is featured on more than 10,000 product packages in over 116 countries. In 2014, UTZ was reported to be the largest program for sustainable farming of coffee and cocoa in the world. The UTZ program addresses agricultural practices, social and living conditions, farm management, and the environment. In January 2018, UTZ officially merged with the Rainforest Alliance in response to the increasing challenges of deforestation, climate change, systemic poverty, and social inequity.

== History ==
UTZ was launched in 2002 as Utz Kapeh, meaning 'Good Coffee' in the Mayan language Quiché. It was founded by Nick Bocklandt, a Belgian-Guatemalan coffee grower, and Ward de Groote, a Dutch coffee roaster, with the goal of implementing sustainability on a large scale in the worldwide market. The Solidaridad Network was another co-initiator of UTZ and assisted UTZ in becoming a global standard through financial support and field implementation.

On 7 March 2007, the Utz Kapeh Foundation officially changed its name and logo to UTZ Certified and, on 1 January 2016, shortened their name to UTZ, meaning 'Good' in the Mayan language Quiché.

In June 2017, the Rainforest Alliance and UTZ announced the intention to merge, and in January 2018, the merger was legally closed and completed. The merged organization goes by the name Rainforest Alliance.

The two organizations' certification programs run in parallel but from July 2021 a new certification program based on the 2020 Sustainable Agriculture Standard will be in place. Transition rules will allow holders with certification under the 2015 UTZ Certification Program to progress to be certified under the new program.

== Products ==
=== Coffee ===
UTZ is the second largest sustainability program in the world for coffee, after 4C (The Common Code for the Coffee Community). 870,102 metric tonnes of coffee was UTZ certified in 2016.

=== Cocoa ===
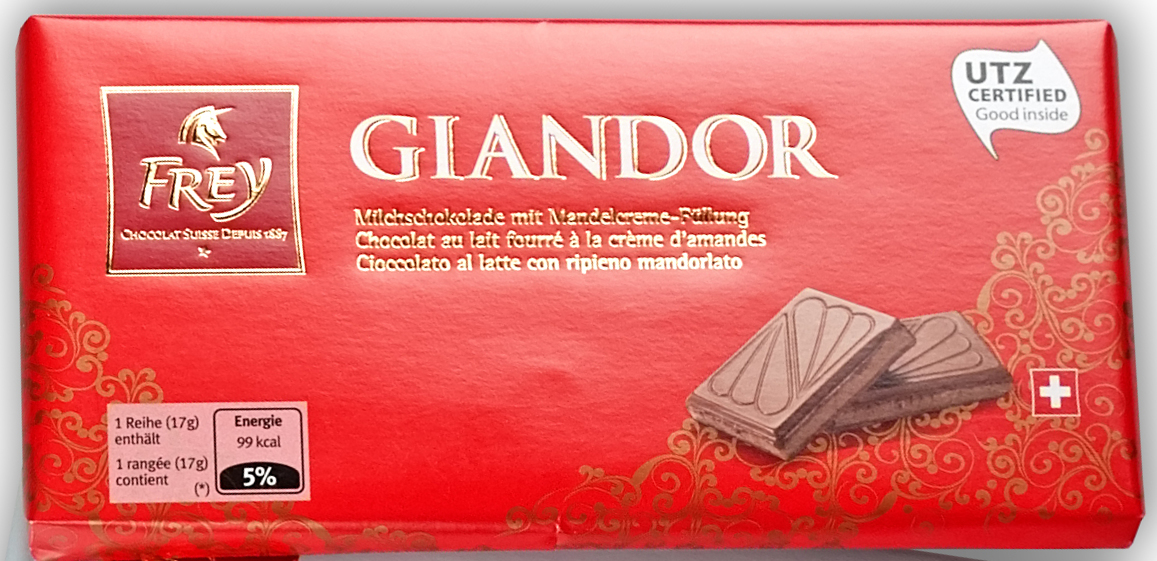
A Swiss chocolate bar with the "UTZ Certified" label

On 10 October 2007, the Cocoa Program was launched. UTZ cooperated with Ahold, Cargill, Heinz Benelux, Mars, Nestlé, and ECOM Agroindustrial to set up a new certification and traceability system for sustainable cocoa. Solidaridad and Oxfam Novib also supported the initiative from the beginning. In 2009 the first UTZ cocoa products reached the market.

As of 2014, UTZ became the largest sustainability program for cocoa in the world, and over 336,300 cocoa farmers from 16 countries were affiliated with UTZ. In 2012, 13% of the cocoa produced in the world was UTZ (535,000 T, out of global production of 2,889,000 T). By 2017, Utz was certifying "1.5 million tons of cocoa, or about two-thirds of the world's supply of certified cocoa." In 2019, "significant problems" had emerged with respect to with four of the auditing organizations working in the Ivory Coast.

=== Tea ===
The UTZ program for tea and rooibos was launched in 2007.

=== Hazelnuts ===
UTZ launched its hazelnut program in 2014 to explore the possibilities for sustainability in this sector as well. The program was originally piloted in Turkey, but since then it has gone global and expanded to Georgia, Azerbaijan, Italy, Spain, and other countries.

== Code of Conduct ==
=== Summary ===
The UTZ certification program is based on the UTZ Code of Conduct: a set of social and environmental criteria for responsible growing practices and efficient farm management. Coffee, cocoa and tea producers who are UTZ certified comply with this code. The Code of Conduct version 2014 is based on the international ILO Conventions and the expertise of many stakeholders, including the farmers who use it. The Code has been developed in a broad stakeholder process and therefore widely accepted. A core code is applicable to all farmers, and there are also additional requirements in product specific modules for coffee, cocoa and tea. The certification system is based on a model of continuous improvement. Producers have to comply with core safety and quality standards from year one. Additional control points are added in the following years.

=== Categories ===
The criteria of the UTZ Code of Conduct fall into four categories:

==== Farm management ====
- Measures to optimize the yield
- Internal Management System for groups, with responsibilities including:
  - Arranging annual internal inspections
- Record keeping
- Risk assessments
- Training and awareness raising
- Recording of volumes in the UTZ traceability system

==== Farming practices ====
- Choice of suitable planting variety
- Farm maintenance
- Soil fertility management
- Diversification of production, to support ecological diversity and economic resilience
- Integrated pest management
- Responsible and appropriate choice and use of agro-chemicals and fertilizers, and records of application
- Irrigation
- Product handling during and after the harvest

==== Social and living conditions ====
- Application of national laws and ILO conventions regarding wages and working hours, including the living wage concept for individual farms
- No forced labor or child labour
- Freedom of association and collective bargaining
- Safe and healthy working conditions, including:
  - Protective clothing for work with chemicals
  - Safety training of workers in their own language
- Gender equality
- No discrimination
- Freedom of cultural expression
- Access to education for children
- Access to decent housing, clean drinking water, and health care for workers and their families

==== Environment ====
- Efficient use of water and energy
- Waste management
- Promotion of ecological diversity
- Protection of nature
- No deforestation of primary forests
- Respect for protected areas
- Protection of endangered species
- Reduction and prevention of soil erosion
- Measures to adapt to climate change

=== Product-Specific modules ===
==== Coffee ====
- Correct fermentation and handling of coffee after harvest
- Treatment of waste water from processing

==== Cocoa ====
- Use of shade trees
- Correct drying and fermentation

==== Tea ====
- Harvest carried out at the appropriate time
- Correct handling of harvested leaves
- Quality control
- Energy and waste water management

==== Rooibos ====
- Crop rotation
- Harvest carried out at the appropriate time
- Correct post-harvest handling
- Bush fire prevention
- Identification and protection of wild rooibos areas

=== Chain of custody ===
To enhance the guarantee that a consumer product with an UTZ logo does indeed credibly link to an UTZ certified producer, the UTZ program contains chain of custody requirements. This is a set of chain-wide administrative, logistical and technical requirements for traceability. These requirements include criteria for separation of UTZ-certified products and conventional non-UTZ-certified products, and keeping records of direct suppliers and buyers.

=== Traceability ===
UTZ certified coffee, cocoa and tea is traceable through the supply chain, as UTZ uses a web-based traceability system.

When an UTZ certified producer sells their products (e.g. coffee, cocoa, tea) to a registered UTZ buyer, the product is announced in the UTZ web-based system. By doing so the seller announces when they are shipping what amount to whom. The buyer then gets notified and needs to confirm this in the traceability system. UTZ assigns a unique tracking number to this lot. At the end of the supply chain, the end product manufacturer uses the unique tracking number to know their product credibly links to a certified source. Some brands use this unique tracking system to make the product traceable for their consumers.

==== Traceability Services ====
UTZ has developed, implemented and is currently managing the traceability system for the Roundtable on Sustainable Palm Oil. This system was launched in December 2008.

=== Certification ===
Independent, third party auditors make annual inspections to ensure coffee producers comply with the Code of Conduct.

==== Certification body ====
A certification body (CB) is an independent, third-party certifier. When approved by UTZ Certified, these organizations conduct annual certification inspections of coffee, cocoa and tea producers to determine whether they comply with the UTZ Certified Code of Conduct and Chain of Custody requirements.

==== Trained agronomists ====
An UTZ-trained agronomist is a technical consultant specifically trained in assisting producers to comply with the UTZ Code of Conduct. Trained agronomists can advise on practical implementation of elements of the Code and give directions on improvement of efficiency in farm management.

== Impact ==
In 2014, UTZ published its first impact report. This brought together 24 external studies and data collected by UTZ. It stated that UTZ cocoa, coffee and tea farms generate higher yields and better quality crops than conventional farms, and being trained in the UTZ Code of Conduct helps farmers to improve their knowledge and adopt sustainable farming practices. There are no independent scientific studies that prove positive effects of UTZ.

== Pricing ==
Coffee, cocoa and tea with an UTZ certification has added value in the sense that it assures buyers that it has been produced according to an internationally recognized standard for responsible production, i.e. according to the UTZ Code of Conduct. The price for UTZ certified coffee is determined in the negotiation process between buyer and seller. UTZ does not interfere in price negotiations. In contrast to fair trade, no minimum purchase price is set. Instead, the focus on good agricultural practices in the UTZ program is intended to enable farmers to increase the quantity and quality of their yield, and thus to increase their income.

== Criticism ==
UTZ certification, like the Rainforest Alliance coffee certification program, has been criticized because it offers producers no minimum or guaranteed price for their crop. Some consider UTZ certified producer organizations to be vulnerable to the volatility of the coffee market.

Michael Conroy, an independent consultant on certification for sustainable development, criticized UTZ in his 2007 book Branded!: "the environmental standards of UTZ Certified are far weaker than those of either Fairtrade or Rainforest Alliance". UTZ's standards, for example, explicitly announces that genetically modified coffee plants, though not at present available, would be allowable so long as farmers obey local regulations on their use. Any kind of chemical fertilizer may be used as long as an external, technically qualified advisor has determined the quantity of fertilizer to be used. No chemical pesticides or fungicides banned in the European Union, the U.S., or Japan may be used, but any that are acceptable in those three markets are acceptable on coffee farms if they are applied "according to the label".

In July 2012, German magazine Ökotest published an article labeling UTZ, among others, as unfair, due to a lack of pre-financing and guaranteed minimum purchase prices. In response UTZ stated that the foundation does not consider its standards fair trade, nor that it claims that they are, while maintaining that its standards contribute positively to sustainable development of tropical farming communities.

In October 2019, the Washington Post reported that UTZ certified cocoa farms were actually more likely to employ child labor than farms without the certification. Additionally, a spokesperson confirmed reports that more than 4,900 UTZ-certified farms were illegally located within national forests. UTZ identified four independent auditing firms it contracts with as the source of most of the flawed certifications.

== See also ==
- Fair trade
- Ethical consumerism
- Harkin–Engel Protocol
- International Federation of Organic Agriculture Movements
