= Max Havelaar Foundation (Switzerland) =

Swiss Fairtrade organization

Max Havelaar-Stiftung
- Type: Non-profit organization
- Founded: 1992; 34 years ago
- Headquarters: Zurich, Switzerland
- Key people: Kathrin Amacker, Foundation Board president
- Website: www.fairtrademaxhavelaar.ch

The Max Havelaar Foundation is a non-profit certification and public education organization promoting Fairtrade products in Switzerland to improve the livelihood of developing world farmers and workers. The Max Havelaar Foundation is the Swiss member of FLO International, which unites 23 Fairtrade producer and labelling initiatives across Europe, Asia, Latin America, North America, Africa, Australia and New Zealand. Several of these corresponding organizations in other European countries also use the Max Havelaar name. The Swiss Max Havelaar organization was founded in 1992 by the Third World aid organisations Brot für alle, Caritas, Fastenopfer, HEKS, Helvetas and Swissaid.

The Foundation was named after Max Havelaar, which is both the title and the main character of a Dutch 19th-century novel (written by Multatuli) critical of Dutch colonialism in the Dutch East Indies.

The mission of the Max Havelaar Foundation is twofold:

1. Ensure that products from producers and workers in disadvantaged regions of the south get access to the Swiss market at fair trade conditions.
2. Certify and control that the products carrying the Max Havelaar label are produced and traded according to the international trade standards validated by FLO International.

The following Fairtrade certified products are currently available in Switzerland:

- cotton (since 2005)
- pineapples (2003)
- bananas (1997)
- flowers (2001, market share 5%)
- honey (1993; 10%)
- coffee (1992; 5%)
- cacao/chocolate (1994; 1%)
- mango (2003)
- orange juice (1999; 7%)
- rice (2002; 3%)
- tea (1995; 5%)
- sugar (1994; 1%)

By volume and value, bananas are the most popular Fairtrade product in the country: in 2005, Max Havelaar/Fairtrade bananas boasted a market share of 56 percent.
