= Fair-trade debate =

The fair-trade debate concerns the ethics and economic implications of fair trade, a term for an arrangement designed to help producers in developing countries achieve sustainable and equitable trade relationships. The benefits of fair trade for farmers and workers can vary considerably and the social transformation impacts also vary around the world. However the main concerns from critics is that fair trade may give an unfair advantage to some producers over others.

Fairtrade researcher Alastair Smith argues that while some criticisms are grounded in acceptable standards of evidence (and deserve serious attention), others are less well elaborated, and that in a few cases the criticisms presented are assertions with little or no credible evidence to support them. These claims have themselves been criticized on matters of fact, theory, methodology, use of evidence and incorrect citations.

== Fair-trade income ==
One study concluded that benefits of fair trade to producers were close to zero because there was an oversupply of certification, and only a fraction of produce classified as fair trade was actually sold on fair-trade markets, just enough to recoup the costs of certification. A study published by the Journal of Economic Perspectives however suggests that fair trade does achieve many of its intended goals, although on a comparatively modest scale relative to the size of national economies.

Consumers buy fair-trade goods for a variety of reasons; some are willing to pay more for Fairtrade-certified products in the belief that this helps the very poor. Critics of the Fairtrade brand have argued that the system diverts profits from the poorest farmers, that the profit is received by corporate firms, and that this causes "death and destitution".

Evidence suggests that little of the extra money paid by consumers actually reaches the farmers. The Fairtrade Foundation does not monitor how much extra retailers charge for Fairtrade goods. Furthermore, retailers almost never sell identical Fairtrade and non-Fairtrade lines side by side, so it is rarely possible to determine how much extra is charged and so how much of that premium reaches the producers. In a very few cases, it has been possible to find out. One British café chain was passing less than one percent of the extra charged to the exporting cooperative; in Finland, Valkila, Haaparanta, and Niemi found that consumers paid much more for Fairtrade, but that only 11.5% of that reached the exporter. Kilian, Jones, Pratt, and Villalobos say U.S. Fairtrade coffee gets US$5 per pound extra at retail, of which the exporter receives only 2%. Mendoza and Bastiaensen calculated that in the UK only 1.6% to 18% of the extra charged for one product line reached the farmer. Critics claim that many counter-examples would be needed to show that these are not typical. Since Fairtrade charges a 1.9% licensing fee at wholesale, the maximum that reaches the developing world, even if traders charge unrealistically low margins, is 50%, and a much smaller amount would reach the target farmers.

The Fairtrade Foundation does not monitor how much of the premium paid to the exporting cooperatives reaches the farmer. Cooperatives incur certification and inspection fees, additional marketing costs, costs in meeting the Fairtrade political standards, and possibly costs arising from the monopoly power of the cooperative. Farmers also incur additional production costs on their production, even if only a small amount is sold at Fairtrade prices. Over the years, Fairtrade producers have been able to sell only 18% to 37% of their output as Fairtrade-certified, selling the rest without certification at market prices. While both proponents and opponents of Fairtrade acknowledge this problem, there are scarce economic studies presenting the actual revenues of Fairtrade cooperatives and how they spend their money. Weber (2006) examined the additional marketing costs of some cooperatives and found, for example, that "after six years Oro Verde can cover only 70 percent of its [additional marketing] costs with its current income stream" and that the cooperative needs to double its current annual export volume in order to sustain its management team. At the time they were losing money on their Fairtrade membership. FLO figures show that 40% of the money reaching the developing world is spent on "business and production," which includes the costs mentioned above as well as costs incurred by inefficiency and corruption in the cooperative or the marketing system. The rest is spent on social projects, rather than being passed on to farmers.

There is no evidence that Fairtrade farmers get higher prices on average.Farmers are allegedly paid more by traders than by Fairtrade cooperatives while others state that they were paid less. Few such anecdotes address the problems of price reporting in developing world markets, or appreciate the complexity of different price packages. A different price package may or may not include credit, harvesting, transport, processing, etc. Cooperatives typically average prices over the year, so they may pay more or less than traders, depending on the day. Basset compares prices only where Fairtrade and non-Fairtrade farmers have to sell cotton to the same monopsonistic ginneries, which pay low prices. Prices would have to be higher to compensate farmers for the increased costs of producing Fairtrade. For instance, when Fairtrade encouraged Nicaraguan farmers to switch to organic coffee, they earned a higher price per pound but a lower net income because of higher costs and lower yields.

=== Fair-trade research ===
Some critics argue that there have been few fair-trade impact studies to confirm the benefits claimed and there have been calls for more evaluations as the movement has grown. A 2009 literature review found 33 studies that met the criteria for impact studies. Griffiths (2011) says that few meet the normal standards for an impact evaluation, such as comparing the before and after situation, having meaningful control groups, and allowing for the facts that Fairtrade recruits farmers who are already better off, that a Fairtrade cooperative receives aid from other organizations (government departments, aid agencies, donor countries, and NGOs), and that Fairtrade may harm other farmers. Other methodological problems arise in sampling, in comparing prices, and from the fact that the social projects of Fairtrade do not usually aim to produce economic benefits.

Due to the snapshot nature of research, few studies include how long producers have been involved with fair trade. A further problem is that most studies ignore the agency and perspective of producer decision makers, especially those farmers excluded from the Fairtrade system. Capturing such socially constructed benefits, including that of confidence in business relationships, is difficult.

There is a difference between impact studies and case studies. Case studies are valuable for, among other things, researching specific systems and sub-systems, constructing models, and identifying problems. However, the impacts noted cannot be extrapolated generally. For instance, if a hundred dairy farms lose money, this does not mean that all or most dairy farms do. There are a lot of case studies on Fairtrade, but many are erroneously referred to as impact studies.

=== Fair-trade market issues ===
One reason for low prices is that Fairtrade farmers are forced to sell through a monopsonist cooperative, which may be inefficient or corrupt. They cannot choose the buyer who offers the best price, or switch when their cooperative is going bankrupt. Fairtrade deviates from the free market ideal of some economists. Brink calls fair trade a "misguided attempt to make up for market failures" that encourages market inefficiencies and overproduction. Sometimes goods are overproduced, leading to the sale of a fair-trade product in a non–fair–trade market, causing potential issues with customers who are paying for fair-trade products despite the fact that the same products are available for lower amounts.

Critics argue that Fairtrade, but not all other fair-trade businesses, harms non-Fairtrade farmers. Fairtrade claims that its farmers are paid higher prices and are given special advice on better techniques, both of which lead to increased output being sold on the global market. Economists assert that, as the demand for coffee is highly inelastic, an increased price for Fairtrade which produces a small increase in supply means a large fall in market price. In addition, the Fairtrade minimum price means that when the world market price collapses, it is the non-Fairtrade farmers, particularly the poorest, who have to cut down their coffee trees. This argument is illustrated with the example of Vietnam paying its coffee farmers above the world market price in the 1980s, planting much coffee, then flooding the world market in the 1990s. Smith (2010) questioned the relevance of the Vietnam example, and Griffiths later published a response.

Low prices may also occur because the fair-trade marketing system provides more opportunities for corruption than the normal marketing system, and less possibility of, or incentive for, controlling it. Corruption has been noted in false labeling of coffee as Fairtrade by retailers and by packers in the developing countries, importers paying exporters less than the Fairtrade price for Fairtrade coffee, failure by importers to provide the credit and other services specified, theft or preferential treatment for ruling elites of cooperatives, and not paying laborers the specified minimum wage.

== Inequity ==
Fair trade is profitable for traders in rich countries. It is also aimed at richer farmers: in order to join Fairtrade, cooperatives must meet quality and political standards which means their farmers must be relatively skillful and educated. Critics point out that these farmers are, therefore, far from the poorest farmers. The majority of Fairtrade suppliers are in the higher income or middle income developing countries, such as Costa Rica and Mexico, with relatively few in the poorest countries. Mexico has 70 times the GNP per capita as Sierra Leone, and much larger coffee farms. The minimum wage of agricultural workers in Peru is US$3 per day and the average income of Fairtrade farmers in Bolivia was US$900/year, much higher than normal agricultural incomes in Africa and much of Asia. Critics say this diverts money from the poorest farmers.

Fairtrade supporters boast of "the honeypot effect": that cooperatives which become Fairtrade members then attract additional aid from other NGO charities, government, and international donors as a result of their membership. Typically this results in six to twelve other donors. Critics point out that this inevitably means that resources are being removed from other, poorer, farmers. It also makes it difficult to discern whether any positive or negative changes can be attributed specifically to either Fairtrade or one of the other donors.

Some research indicates that the implementation of certain fair-trade standards can cause greater inequalities in some markets where these rigid rules are inappropriate for the specific market.

== Other issues ==
=== Political coercion ===
The Fairtrade criteria presuppose a set of political values as to what economic, environmental, and social problems exist and how they are to be solved. Critics say it is unethical to bribe developing world producers to act according to political viewpoints that they may not agree with, and that the consumers providing the money may not agree with. These critics also state that the unorthodox marketing system imposed, which aims to replace capitalism, may not tie in with the objectives of producers, consumers, importers, or retailers.

Booth says that the selling techniques used by some sellers and supporters of Fairtrade are bullying, misleading, and unethical. Boycott campaigns and other pressure force sellers to stock a product they think ethically suspect. However, the opposite has been argued, that a more participatory and multi-stakeholder approach to auditing might improve the quality of the process. Some people argue that these practices are justifiable: strategic use of labeling may embarrass (or encourage) major suppliers into changing their practices. They may bring to light corporate vulnerabilities that activists can exploit. Or they may encourage ordinary people to get involved with broader projects of social change.

Volunteers may do unpaid work for fair-trade firms, or promote fair-trade organizations in schools and local governments, often without full awareness that these are not non-profit organizations. Davies and Crane report that Day Chocolate "made considerable use of unpaid volunteer workers for routine tasks, many of whom seemed to be under the (false) impression that they were helping out a charity. Not only might one question the sometimes quite excessive use of unpaid labour in a for-profit organisation, but the management team at Day appeared to have no intention of correcting the obvious misapprehensions of the volunteers. However, this did not appear to be acknowledged as a potential ethical problem at Day."

There have been complaints that Fairtrade standards are inappropriate and may harm producers, sometimes imposing months of additional work for little return.

=== Failure to enforce standards ===
Christian Jacquiau and Paola Ghillani (who spent four years as president of Fairtrade Labelling Organizations) claim that adherence to fair-trade standards by producers has been poor and that enforcement of standards by Fairtrade is weak. Labourers on Fairtrade farms in Peru are paid less than the minimum wage; some non-Fairtrade coffee is sold as Fairtrade; "the standards are not very strict in the case of seasonally hired labour in coffee production"; "some fair-trade standards are not strictly enforced"; and supermarkets may avoid their responsibility. In 2006, a Financial Times journalist found that all ten out of the ten mills they visited had sold uncertified coffee to co-operatives as certified. It reported on "evidence of at least one coffee association that received Fairtrade certification despite illegally growing some 20 per cent of its coffee in protected national forest land.

=== False advertising ===
Another criticism is that false claims made for fair trade and the withholding of relevant information constitute Unfair Trading under EU law.

Under EU law (Directive 2005/29/EC on Unfair Commercial Practices) the criminal offence of Unfair Trading is committed if (a) advertising or selling information "contains false information and is therefore untruthful or in any way, including overall presentation, deceives or is likely to deceive the average consumer, even if the information is factually correct", (b) "it omits material information that the average consumer needs… and thereby causes or is likely to cause the average consumer to take a transactional decision that he would not have taken otherwise" or (c) "fails to identify the commercial intent of the commercial practice… [which] causes or is likely to cause the average consumer to take a transactional decision that he would not have taken otherwise." Griffiths (2011) points to false claims that Fairtrade producers get higher prices, the almost universal failures to disclose the extra price charged for Fairtrade products, to disclose how much of this actually reaches the developing world, to disclose what this is spent on in the developing world, to disclose how much (if any) reaches farmers, and to disclose the harm that Fairtrade does to non-Fairtrade farmers. He also points to the failure to disclose when "the primary commercial intent" is to make money for retailers and distributors

== Trade justice and fair trade ==
Segments of the trade justice movement have also criticized fair trade for focusing too much on individual small producer groups without advocating trade policy changes that would have a larger impact on disadvantaged producers' lives. RFI correspondent Jean-Pierre Boris championed this view in his 2005 book Commerce inéquitable.

== Political objections ==
Political criticisms of Fairtrade come from both the left and the right. Some believe the fair-trade system is not radical enough. French author Christian Jacquiau, in his book Les coulisses du commerce équitable, calls for stricter fair-trade standards and criticizes the fair-trade movement for working within the current system (i.e. partnerships with mass retailers, multinational corporations, etc.) rather than establishing a new fairer, fully autonomous trading system. Jacquiau also supports significantly higher fair-trade prices in order to maximize the impact, as most producers only sell a portion of their crop under fair-trade terms. It has been argued that the FairTrade system is too rooted in a Northern consumerist view of justice which Southern producers do not participate in. "A key issue is therefore to make explicit who possesses the power to define the terms of Fairtrade, that is who possesses the power to determine the need of an ethic in the first instance, and subsequently command a particular ethical vision as the truth." Some free market criticisms of Fairtrade appear to be linked to right wing political approaches, but this does not mean that their analysis in this particular case is unacceptable to mainstream economists.

== Counter-arguments ==
Key ideas of fair trade include transparency and capacity building, as outlined by the WFTO fair-trade principles. Particularly in the developing world, it is common for small-scale farmers to have only one or two buyers for their commodity products. Prices thus can be set by the buyers along with quality criteria. Normally buyers do not provide transparency as to the weighing and grading of product. Unless the buyers are linked to a quality supply chain (such as a fair-trade or organic supply chain), the buyers normally do not provide any capacity-building to improve the quality of the product and thus gain a higher price. Fair trade, when practiced well, must provide full transparency in terms of pricing, weighing, and quality standards. As the end goal is a superior quality product in all ways, good fair-trade organizations provide good capacity building in terms of best production, harvest, and post-harvest practices.

Hayes identifies limitations in LeClaire's (2002) formulation of this, both using what they agree is an unrealistic model.

== See also ==
- Fair-trade certification
- Fair-trade coffee

== Bibliography ==
- Berndt, C.E. (2007), Is Fair Trade in coffee production fair and useful? Evidence from Costa Rica and Guatemala and implications for policy, Mercatus 65 Policy Series, Policy Comment, vol. 11, Washington, DC: Mercatus Centre, George Mason University.
- Kilian, B.; Jones, C.; Pratt, L.; Villalobos, A. (2006), "Is Sustainable Agriculture a Viable Strategy to Improve Farm Income in Central America? A Case Study on Coffee", Journal of Business Research, 59 (3): 322–330, doi:10.1016/j.jbusres.2005.09.015.
- Kohler, P. (2006), The economics of Fair Trade: for whose benefit? An investigation into the limits of Fair Trade as a development tool and the risk of clean-washing, HEI Working Papers, vol. 6, Geneva: Economics Section, Graduate Institute of International Studies, October.
- Mohan, S. (2010), Fair Trade Without the Froth – a dispassionate economic analysis of 'Fair Trade', London: Institute of Economic Affairs.
- Valkila, J. (2009). "Fair Trade organic coffee production in Nicaragua – Sustainable development or a poverty trap?". Ecological Economics. 68 (12): 3018–3025. Bibcode:2009EcoEc..68.3018V. doi:10.1016/j.ecolecon.2009.07.002.
- Utting, K. (2009). "Assessing the impact of Fair Trade Coffee: Towards an Integrative Framework". Journal of Business Ethics. 86: 127–149. doi:10.1007/s10551-008-9761-9. S2CID 154359304.
- Valkila, J.; Haaparanta, P.; Niemi, N. (2010). "Empowering Coffee Traders? The Coffee Value Chain from Nicaraguan Fair Trade Farmers to Finnish Consumers". Journal of Business Ethics. 97 (2): 257–270. doi:10.1007/s10551-010-0508-z. S2CID 146802807.
