= Fairtrade International =

Group promoting a living income for farmers

- Type: Nonprofit (German registered association)
- Industry: Product certification
- Founded: 1997; 29 years ago
- Headquarters: Bonn, Germany
- Products: Producer Business Development, Standards Development
- Revenue: 27,510,784 euro (2019)
- Website: www.fairtrade.net

Fairtrade International, or Fairtrade Labelling Organizations International E.V. is a nonprofit product-oriented multistakeholder group aimed at promoting the lives of farmers and workers through fair trade. Fairtrade's work is guided by a global strategy focused on ensuring that all farmers earn a living income, and agricultural workers earn a living wage. Fairtrade works with farmers and workers of more than 300 commodities. The main products promoted under the Fairtrade label are coffee, cocoa, banana, flowers, tea, and sugar. But there are also some critical points about Fairtrade etc. which need to be regonized and held in mind.

Fairtrade is an association of three Producer Networks, nineteen National Fairtrade Organisations (formerly: Fairtrade Labelling Organisations) and eight Fairtrade Marketing Organisations that promote and market the Fairtrade Certification Mark in their countries

Producer Networks exist in Latin America, The Caribbeans, Africa, Middle East, Asia and the Pacific. National Fairtrade Organisations exist in 16 European countries as well as in Canada, the United States, Japan, Australia and New Zealand. Fairtrade International also oversees Fairtrade Marketing Organisations in the Czech Republic, Korea, Hong Kong, Taiwan, India, Philippines, and Poland.

== History ==
Fairtrade International was established in 1997. It set private standards relating to labour, cooperative organisation, and the governance of the Fairtrade benefits. The organisation was divided in January 2004 into two independent organisations:

- Fairtrade International develops and reviews Fairtrade standards and assists producers in gaining and maintaining certification and in capitalizing on market opportunities on the Fairtrade market. The standards are developed and reviewed by the Fairtrade Standards and Policy Committee, in which Fairtrade members, producer organizations, traders and external experts participate.
- FLOCERT ensures that producers and traders comply with the FLO Fairtrade Standards and that producers invest the benefits received through Fairtrade in their development. Operating independently from any other interests, it follows the international ISO standards for certification bodies (ISO 65).

== Membership ==
The following are National Fairtrade Organizations and Fairtrade Marketing Organizations:

- Fairtrade Australia and New Zealand
- (Austria) Fairtrade Österreich
- Fairtrade Belgium
- Fairtrade Canada
- (Czech Republic) (Slovakia) Fairtrade Česko a Slovensko (Marketing Organization)
- (Denmark) Fairtrade Mærket Danmark
- Fairtrade Finland (incl. Baltic states)
- Fairtrade Max Havelaar France
- (Germany) Fairtrade Deutschland
- Fairtrade Hong Kong (Marketing Organization)
- Fairtrade India (Marketing Organization)
- (Republic of Ireland) Fairtrade Ireland
- (Italy) Fairtrade Italia
- Fairtrade Japan
- Fairtrade Korea (Marketing Organization)
- (Luxembourg) Fairtrade Lëtzebuerg
- (Netherlands) Fairtrade Nederland (Max Havelaar)
- (Norway) Fairtrade Norge
- (Poland) Fairtrade Polska (Marketing Organization)
- (Spain) (Portugal) Fairtrade Ibérica
- (Sweden) Fairtrade Sverige
- (Switzerland) Fairtrade Max Havelaar
- Fairtrade Taiwan (Marketing Organization)
- The Fairtrade Foundation (United Kingdom)
- (United States) Fairtrade America

These initiatives were joined in 2007 by three Producer Networks:

- Network of Asian and Pacific Producers (NAPP)
- Coordinadora Latinoamericana y del Caribe de Pequeños Productores de Comercio Justo (CLAC)
- Fairtrade Africa

== Structure ==
Fairtrade International is divided into six units:

- Standards and Pricing—sets and maintains fair trade standards
- Finance, Operations and Central Services—ensures coordinated communications, finance, human resources, fundraising, and IT services
- Global Products, Programs, and Policies. Implements all the commodity facing work, as well as programs on living income, living wages, and climate change
- Monitoring, Evaluation and Learning- Data governance and management, research and impact.
- External Relations - In charge of resource mobilization, communications and advocacy
- Brand, Trademark, and Licensing. Promotes the integrity of the Fairtrade Mark and relationships with licensees.

The coordination of all global activities is led by a Global Leadership Team, made of the CEO, the COO, and the CVO (Chief Value Officer).

== Fairtrade standards ==
Given the development focus of fair trade, related standards contain minimum requirements that all producer organisations must meet to become certified as well as progress requirements in which producers must demonstrate improvements over time.

There are two types of Fairtrade standards for disadvantaged producers: standards for small farmers' organizations and for hired labor situations.

- Small farmers' organization standards include requirements for democratic decision making, ensuring that producers have a say in how the Fairtrade premiums are invested, etc. They also include requirements for capacity building and economic strengthening of the organization.
- Hired labour situation standards seek to ensure that employees receive decent wages and may join unions and bargain collectively. Fairtrade certified plantations must also ensure that there is no forced or child labour and that health and safety requirements are met. In a hired labor situation, fair trade standards require a "joint body" to be set up with representatives from both management and employees. This joint body decides on how fairtrade premiums will be spent to benefit plantation employees.

For some products, such as coffee, only Fairtrade standards for small farmers' organizations are applicable. For others, such as tea, both small farmers' organizations and plantations can be certified.

Fair trade standards and procedures are approved by the FLO Standards Committee, an external committee comprising all FLO stakeholders (labeling initiatives, producers, and traders) and external experts. Fair trade standards are set in accordance to the requirements of the ISEAL Code of Good Practice in standards setting and are in addition the result of an extensive consultation process, involving a variety of stakeholders: producers, traders, external experts, inspectors, certification staff etc.

In 2020, Fairtrade issued a position statement defending their use of private standards in response to a report from The Institute for Multi-Stakeholder Initiative Integrity (MSI Integrity).

== Hazardous materials ==
A list of hazardous materials whose use in production of Fairtrade products is prohibited or restricted is maintained by Fairtrade International, divided into sections known as the "Red List", "Orange List" and "Yellow List" respectively. The Red List covers materials which are prohibited and may not be used in Fairtrade products. The Orange List details materials which may only be used in specified conditions; some of these were to be disallowed from June 2020 or June 2022. The Yellow List covers materials which are flagged as hazardous and only to be used with caution. The organisation relied on international conventions including the Stockholm Convention on Persistent Organic Pollutants (2014) in formulating its list. Earlier versions of the list distinguished between "red" (prohibited) and "amber" (under consideration for prohibition) elements.

== Child labour ==
Fairtrade prohibits child labour and anyone under 15 years old cannot be employed by Fairtrade organisation. Children under 18 years old can be employed, but their employment cannot interfere with their education or development. Children are only allowed to work on family farms under strict conditions, the work must be age appropriate and outside of school hours or on holidays.

Fairtrade faced backlash as child labour was found on four out of six its cocoa plantations in the Ivory Coast.

== International Fairtrade Certification Mark ==
The Fairtrade Mark is an international independent consumer Mark which appears on products as a guarantee that producers and traders have met fair trade standards. The Fairtrade Mark is owned and protected by Fairtrade International, on behalf of its 25-member and associate member labeling initiatives and producer networks.

For a product to carry the Fairtrade Mark, it must come from FLOCERT inspected and certified producer organizations. The crops must be grown and harvested in accordance with the International Fairtrade Standards set by Fairtrade International. The supply chain is also monitored by FLOCERT to ensure the integrity of labelled products. Only authorized licensees can use the Fairtrade Mark on their products.

== Impact and criticism ==
Different researches have found out different results about how similar some certifications are working and how well Fairtrade really is. The study from Dietz did a meta study amount of 175 papers which found the sustainability certifications critical and also not so positive as they usually are sounding for everyone. Having bigger goals like reducing poverty hadn´t such good results as for the prices of such products etc. This fits well with the studies made in Peru, Ghana and Rwanda which referred certification to a higher crop yield but the farmers household income was only higher in Rwanda.Another critical point is that in Ghana those certified farmers had also higher income and cocoa yields but the study from Wätzold pointed out that he hasn´t found clear defined benefits for the nature, trees and animals on the farm.Furthermore another analysis argued that the increasing prices are happening later in the whole supply chain as a example in shops. The Fairtrade dark chocholate has a higher price so also give higher margins than cheaper usual dark chocolate in the shop.But in all the final price is affeceted and shaped the most by the profit which is made by the retailers which was noted in a 2025 review. It has pointed out critically that the incomes where not shared eqally between all producers which contributed.
