= The Fairtrade Foundation =

Charity promoting and licensing Fairtrade certification in the United Kingdom

- Type: Charitable organisation
- Founded: 1992; 34 years ago
- Headquarters: London, E1; United Kingdom
- Key people: Eleanor Harrison (Chief Executive)
- Website: www.fairtrade.net/uk-en

The Fairtrade Foundation is a charity based in the United Kingdom that aims to help disadvantaged producers in developing countries by tackling injustice in conventional trade, in particular by promoting and licensing the Fairtrade Mark, a guarantee that products retailed in the UK have been produced in accordance with internationally agreed Fairtrade standards. The foundation is the British member of FLO International, which unites FLO-CERT, 25 National Fairtrade Organisations and 3 Producer Networks across Europe, Asia, Latin America, North America, Africa, Australia and New Zealand.

The organisation is an independent non-profit organisation that licenses use of the Fairtrade Mark on products in the UK in accordance with internationally agreed Fairtrade standards.

== Areas of activity ==
Its four key areas of activity include:

- Providing independent certification & licensing use of the Fairtrade mark;
- Aid producers' position in the Fairtrade sector when selling to traders and retailers;
- Work with partner organisations to support producer organisations and networks;
- Raising awareness of Fairtrade issues and the role of Fairtrade.

== How it works ==
The marketing system for Fairtrade and non-Fairtrade products is identical in the consuming countries, using mostly the same importing, packing, distributing and retailing firms. Some independent brands operate a virtual company, paying importers, packers and distributors and advertising agencies to handle their brand, for cost reasons. In the producing country Fairtrade is marketed only by Fairtrade certified cooperatives, however if there is not enough market demand, those products are sold onto the conventional market at market prices, marketed by Fairtrade certified cooperatives (as uncertified), by other cooperatives and by ordinary traders.

Cooperative traders and exporters can only sell produce on Fairtrade terms if they meet the set of standards set by Fairtrade International that demand minimum requirements to criteria such as pricing and terms of trade. Farmers pay FLOCERT a certification and inspection fee. Other administration costs and production costs are incurred to meet these standards. Commodity prices can drop when the world market is oversupplied. A minimum price, which is paid to producers, acts as a safety net for farmers at times when world markets fall below a sustainable level. An additional sum of money, called the Fairtrade Premium, is paid to farmers for products sold on Fairtrade terms. Some cooperatives can sell only a third of their output as Fairtrade, because of lack of market demand, and sell the rest at world prices. As the additional costs are incurred on all production, not just that sold as Fairtrade, cooperatives sometimes lose money on their Fairtrade membership. After the certification fees have been subtracted from the overall income earned on Fairtrade terms, the rest goes into a communal fund for workers and farmers to use as decided democratically within the farmers' organisation, or by a workers' committee on a plantation. The additional sum (Fairtrade Premium) is invested in ‘social projects’ such as clinics, women's groups and baseball pitches.

To become certified Fairtrade producers, the primary cooperative and its member farmers must operate to certain Fairtrade standards, set by the organisation. FLO-CERT, the for-profit side, handles producer certification, inspecting and certifying producer organisations in more than 50 countries in Africa, Asia, and Latin America. In the fair trade debate there are many complaints regarding apparent failed enforcement of these standards, with Fairtrade cooperatives, importers, and packers profiting by evading them.

== Criticism ==
Fairtrade operations have led to criticism of the foundation. It is argued that, because retailers and cafes in the rich countries can sell Fairtrade coffee at any price they like, nearly all the extra price paid by consumers, 82% to 99%, is kept in the rich countries as increased profit. There is evidence that dishonest importers do not pay the full Fairtrade price, so an even smaller proportion reaches the Global South. Fairtrade operates a system whereby such allegations are reported to FLOCert for investigation.

Critics therefore argue that farmers do not benefit from higher prices under Fairtrade: there is no consensus on whether co-operatives pay farmers more or less. Farmers do, however, incur extra costs in producing Fairtrade, however there is sparse research on these extra costs incurred, or the effect of Fairtrade membership on farmers' income. However, research by Overseas Development Institute found that a "wide variety of qualitative studies have found positive effects of Fairtrade certification on the incomes of producers".

Other economists have argued that the existence of a fair trade marketing route benefits producers by raising producer prices generally, and there is evidence of such an effect at least among coffee producers. According to Podhorsky, the critics of the Fairtrade Foundation wrongly assume that fair trade producers usually receive the world price for coffee.

== Organisational links ==
The foundation was established in 1992 by CAFOD, Christian Aid, New Consumer, Oxfam, Traidcraft and the World Development Movement. These organisations were later joined by the Women's Institute, Britain's largest women's organisation, and other organisations including Banana Link, Methodist Relief and Development Fund, Nicaragua Solidarity Campaign, People & Planet, SCIAF, Shared Interest Foundation, Soroptimist International, Tearfund and the United Reformed Church.

== Promotion ==
The Fairtrade Foundation organises and coordinates promotional campaigns and events every year, such as the Fairtrade Fortnight (typically in February/March). The foundation also coordinates the Fairtrade Town campaign, which designates areas and towns committed to the promotion of Fairtrade certified goods.

The Fairtrade Foundation's current campaign aims to highlight the goal of achieving living incomes for cocoa farmers in West Africa.

== Public reception ==
Since The Co-operative Food became the first supermarket to sell a Fairtrade product (Cafedirect coffee) in 1992, both the range and total sales of Fairtrade certified products in UK supermarkets has grown extensively. In 2013, there were over 4,000 Fairtrade products available in the UK with estimated sales of over £1.7bn. This rose to nearly 5,000 Fairtrade products in 2025, while sales were estimated at over £2.3bn in 2022.

In 2014, Fairtrade certified sales in the United Kingdom amounted to an estimated retail value of £1.68 billion, up from £273 million in 2006. Volumes of Fairtrade banana sales grew by 3% in 2014, generating an estimated £7.9 million of Fairtrade premium. One in three bananas bought in the United Kingdom carries the Fairtrade label. Fairtrade sales of coffee, which remains Fairtrade's best known product, rose 9% generating an estimated £5 million of Fairtrade premium in 2014.

It is estimated that around 75-90% of British adults can identify the Fairtrade Certification Mark as of the 2020s, up from 25% in 2003, 39% in 2004, 50% in 2005 and 57% in 2007. In 2008, an estimated two in three UK households regularly bought at least one Fairtrade-labelled product.

== Where it takes place ==
Africa	Asia	Australasia	Caribbean	Central America	South America
Tanzania	India	Papua New Guinea	Saint Lucia	Costa Rica	Colombia
Uganda	Sri Lanka		Dominican Republic	Nicaragua	Bolivia
Malawi	Vietnam			Mexico	Peru
Ghana				Guatemala	Argentina
Ethiopia				Belize	Paraguay
Kenya				Honduras	
Côte d'Ivoire					
South Africa					
