= Jean-Pierre Boris =

French journalist

Jean-Pierre Boris is a journalist at Radio France Internationale (RFI) since 1982.

From 1998 to 2005, Boris was the station's commodities correspondent and hosted a daily show on the topic. The show explored the geopolitical role of commodities and globalization. In 2005, Boris published the book Unfair Trade: The Black Book of commodities (ISBN 2-01-235781-4).

== Biography ==
Specialist in Latin America, where Jean-Pierre Boris has produced numerous reports. From 1998 to 2005, he covered commodity news in a daily column. After serving as editor-in-chief of RFI's France department (2005-2006) and then working in the Americas desk of the radio station's international department, Jean-Pierre Boris covered African economic news for six years. From 2014 until June 2021, when he retired, he produced RFI's weekly economics program Eco d'ici Eco d'ailleurs. The program was broadcast every Saturday morning and rebroadcast at midday.

He is the author of the book Main basse sur le riz (A Hand in Rice) and a documentary film of the same title directed by Jean Crépu and broadcast on the Arte channel. Both authors received the 2010 FIPA d'Or award in the “Feature Reports and Social Issues” category for this film.

== Works ==
- Commerce inéquitable: Le roman noir des matières premières. (2005) Paris: Hachette Littératures.
- Main basse sur le riz
