= Solidaridad (organization) =

- Type: Charitable organization
- Founded: 1969
- Headquarters: Utrecht, Netherlands
- Key people: Andre de Freitas, Director
- Number of employees: ~1,300 (2025)
- Website: www.solidaridadwork.org/

The Solidaridad Network is an international civil society organisation founded in 1969. Its main objective is facilitating the development of socially responsible, ecologically sound and profitable supply chains. It operates through eight regional expertise centers in over 50 countries.

== History ==
The organization was founded in 1969.

In 1988, Solidaridad founded the Max Havelaar coffee label, considered the starting point for the Fairtrade movement. Having introduced Fairtrade coffee, Solidaridad went on to develop a similar scheme for bananas in 1996. In the 1990s, Solidaridad broadened its scope toward working with companies in corporate social responsibility (CSR) programmes and certification. Moving forward, the organization focused further on working with producers in international supply chains by supporting round tables for commodities such as coffee, livestock, soy, cocoa, cotton, livestock, dairy, tea, textiles, sugarcane, fruit & vegetables, gold, textiles, palm oil, and aquaculture.

In 2016, Solidaridad launched a five-year strategic plan focussed on four thematic areas- robust infrastructure, good practices, sustainable landscapes and enabling policy environments.

In 2018, Solidaridad won the Arrell Global Food Innovation Award.

== Initiatives ==
=== Textiles & Cotton ===
In 2017, Solidaridad launched the Sustainable Cotton Ranking Index with the World Wildlife Fund and Pesticide Action Network UK. This analyzed the performance of 75 companies and their sustainable cotton uptake. The report revealed that the majority of brands are not doing enough to increase their sustainable cotton use.

=== Soy ===
Solidaridad is one of the founders and board members of the Round Table on Responsible Soy. In 2017, Solidaridad carried out a project that led to the certification of 30,125 tons of soybeans produced by 18 small and medium-scale farmers in the region of Silvânia and Orizona, Goias. This was the first time small and medium-scale soy growers in Goias, Brazil have been able to receive certification from the Round Table on Responsible Soy.

=== Gold ===
Solidaridad assists small-scale gold mines to reduce their environmental impact. In Ghana, Solidaridad helps miners to implement mercury-free technologies. In 2016, the first mine in Africa to reach Fairtrade certification, Syanyonja Artisan Miners' Alliance in Uganda, was a partner of a Solidaridad partnership with Fairtrade Foundation in East Africa.

=== Palm Oil ===
Solidaridad promotes better land-use planning to meet the growing demand for palm oil. In 2014, Solidaridad launched the Sustainable West Africa Palm Oil Programme (SWAPP).

In 2016, Henkel and BASF launched a collaboration with Solidaridad in Indonesia to train 5,500 smallholders implement good agricultural practices. The project spans an area of roughly 16,000 hectares.
