= FLOCERT =

- Type: Private
- Industry: Product certification
- Founded: November 2003; 22 years ago
- Headquarters: Bonn, Germany
- Key people: Dr. Thorsten Niklas (chief executive officer); Natalie McLachlan (chief people and governance officer); Bronwyn Page-Shipp (chief regional officer)
- Products: Audit, Certification, Assurance Audits, Social Audits, EDGE Audits, Living Wage and Living Income Audits, HRIA, HREDD, Trade Audit
- Website: flocert.net

Flocert AG (stylized FLOCERT) is a leading global assurance provider. Besides providing certification to Fairtrade, FLOCERT offers certification and verification as well as customised sustainability to support companies in their ethical business transformation. FLOCERT is headquartered in Bonn, Germany.

== History ==
FLOCERT was born out of the Fairtrade movement. Fairtrade International (known back then as Fairtrade Labelling Organisations International or FLO) was established to unite fair trade across countries. In 1997, Fairtrade International began setting out its global standard for fairly traded products, and certifying the producers that made up fair trade supply chains. As the initiative grew, Fairtrade International decided that in order to ensure the certification system was consistently independent and credible, the standard-setting side of the organisation should be separated from the arm that assesses and verifies its producers. Thus, FLOCERT was founded in 2003 as a subsidiary of Fairtrade International to act independently of the standard-setting side of the organisation. Since 2003, FLOCERT has been independently verifying that all companies involved in Fairtrade supply chains are meeting and maintaining Fairtrade Standards. Today, they are also offering a range of services to support organisations committed to ethical business practices.

== Services ==
Working with all types of organisations, from small producers to internationally recognised brands, FLOCERT's approach enables businesses to improve their ethical practices and implement their strategic sustainability goals. FLOCERT offers certification services to show their business meets recognised standards, verification services for business looking to confirm a specific claim or statement, and Customised Sustainability to support businesses in setting up a unique code with a unique audit framework.

Fairtrade promotes better prices, decent working conditions, local sustainability and fair terms of trade for farmers and workers in the developing world. FLOCERT's role in this is to certifies all elements of the supply chain – from farming or production of raw materials, all the way to final packaging. To do this, FLOCERT auditors visit organisations to assess whether they meet the Fairtrade Standards.

== Accreditations ==
Since 2007, FLOCERT has ISO 17065 accreditation, the international standard for ensuring fair and capable certification of products, processes and services. To be accredited FLOCERT is regularly audited by the German National Accreditation body DAkkS.
