= Barnaby Miln =

British social activist

- Miln in 2026
- Born: 6 August 1947 (age 79)
- Citizenship: United Kingdom
- Education: Mostyn House School, Loretto and Edinburgh School of Agriculture
- Occupations: Classical Music Editor for edinburghguide.com, Property Convener for St Vincent's Chapel, Edinburgh. Secretary and Trustee of The Edinburgh Sacred Arts Foundation
- Years active: Online journalism since 2007, editing since 2012
- Known for: British Social Activist
- Board member of: The Edinburgh Sacred Arts Foundation
- Partner: Sir Derek Pattinson (1986–2006; his death)
- Awards: National awards for Seed Innovation
- Website: edinburghsacredartsfestival.or

Barnaby Kemp Graham Miln (born 6 August 1947) is a British social activist and former magistrate. He was the first lay person to come out as gay in the General Synod of the Church of England and thereby the most publicly gay magistrate in England and Wales.

== Family background ==
The Miln family originates from Barry Mill, since 1988 the property of the National Trust for Scotland, in Barry, a village near Carnoustie in Angus in Scotland. The Miln genealogy back to 1614 is recorded in Burke's Landed Gentry. Barnaby Miln's coat of arms Letters Patent were granted on 7th August 1967 and matriculated at the Court of the Lord Lyon King of Arms on 8 August 1967, and re-matriculated on 12 October 1998, after the death of his father, Captain William Wallace Graham Miln (1919 - 1994) 1st Battalion, The Black Watch (Royal Highland Regiment) 1939–1946.

== Early life and education ==
Miln was educated at Mostyn House School, once a prestigious preparatory boarding school for 160 boys from 8 to 13 years, in Parkgate on the Wirral Peninsula in Cheshire, where his end of term reports show that he was happy, an all-rounder and clever. This was followed by Loretto School, Musselburgh, close to Edinburgh, the smallest of the great public schools with 240 boys with a reputation for being spartan, sporty and very strict. After a year as farm student with Tommy Dale, of Scoughall in East Lothian, he was the third generation of his family to be a graduate of the Edinburgh School of Agriculture. He was elected a member of the Edinburgh University students' representative council and was present and on duty when the rector, Malcolm Muggeridge, used a sermon at St. Giles' Cathedral in January 1968, to resign his post in protest against the council's liberal views on "pot and pills."

== Seedsman and plant breeder ==
His father, grandfather and great-grandfather were each in their time managing director of the largest agricultural plant breeding and seed company in the United Kingdom, Gartons Agricultural Plant Breeders plc. Barnaby Miln was the elder son of the fourth generation and went on to professional seed and plant breeding training firstly with the family firm, then in Minneapolis, USA, with Northrup-King & Co, at the time the world's largest seed company, and at the National Institute of Agricultural Botany, Cambridge. Just as he was a fully qualified seedsman and plant breeder the family business was taken over.

Whilst with Gartons plc he was a co-breeder and responsible for the final selection of the first wheat variety to apply for, in 1965, and be granted Plant breeders' rights in the United Kingdom, Gartons Apex Wheat.

Whilst with Northrup-King & Co he originated their sugar beet breeding programme, managed their turf grass trials ground, and studied seed vigour at their Minneapolis and Eden Prairie seed agronomy research centres.

In 1973 he set up his own agricultural seed company in Herefordshire, UK, Milns of Bodenham Limited, later adding two garden centres and a turf grass research facility - where he invented the patented process of seed lamination in 1980. Years later, working near Edinburgh, he developed the process and won the Scotland on Sunday/KPMG Award for Innovation in October 1995. In January 1996 he was the Scotland on Sunday/KPMG Scotland's Innovator of Promise.

== Christian Aid ==
Working as Christian Aid's horticultural consultant he devised their show garden in 1997 which won a Royal Horticultural Society's Silver Gilt Medal (Flora range), the highest medal awarded at that show. The planting theme was Robert Fortune, the plant hunter, who had introduced the tea plant from China to India. Fairtrade and especially Clipper Fairtrade tea from Beaminster was featured. A number of television programmes highlighted the show garden including a BBC Songs of Praise with The Princess Royal being shown the plants by Barnaby Miln.

== Fairtrade Fortnight ==
As a Christian Aid consultant Barnaby Miln set up the first Fairtrade fortnight. This was held initially throughout Scotland. It was launched in Edinburgh by Lady Marion Fraser LT on 12 February 1997 and held from 1 to 14 March 1997 when supporters of development charities like Christian Aid and Oxfam demanded their local supermarket stock fairtrade products. Later that year he spearheaded the fairtrade exhibition at the Commonwealth Conference in Edinburgh.

== Plant varieties and family historian ==
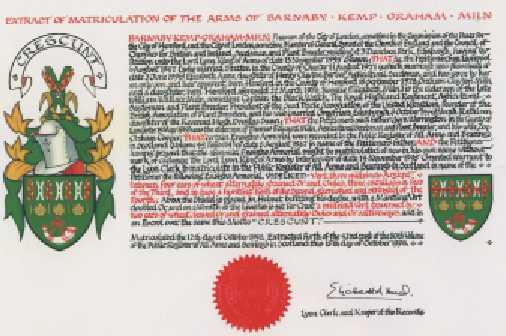

Miln is a descendant of Robert Fortune, and as a plant variety historian, he has researched the more than two hundred garden plants he introduced to the United Kingdom from China. He has also researched the almost two hundred varieties of new crop plants bred and introduced to United Kingdom agriculture by his family's business, Gartons Agricultural Plant Breeders plc.

== Elderly care ==
For ten years starting in 1981, Miln and his life partner created and built up Hereford's first residential care home for the elderly. The care home initially housed four people, but eventually rose to twenty four residents.

After this time, Miln was then Bursar of the City of Westminster's residential care homes for the elderly.

== Career as a magistrate ==
Whilst still in his late twenties but already a local councillor and churchwarden his name was submitted to be a Justice of the Peace. For thirteen years he sat on the City of Hereford magistrates' bench and then for three years the City of London bench.

Chairing a court in 1985 he had dealt with a case involving a burglar he sent to prison who responded by saying that as he had AIDS, an illness then almost unknown in Hereford, he was being given a death sentence "I know I could be dead within 18 months to two years and that is the worst punishment I could ever have." In 1992 he became a Freeman of the City of London but not long afterwards Miln stepped down from the bench.

== Church of England ==
Barnaby Miln chaired the steering group during the building of a new church, St Barnabas, Hereford, and chaired its committee from its dedication by the Bishop of Hereford on 9 December 1981 and its consecration on 16 July 1982 by the Bishop of Hereford in the presence of The Princess Margaret, Countess of Snowdon.

He was a governor of the Bishop of Hereford's Bluecoat School, Hereford, between 1983 and 1989 and was present in Hereford Cathedral when it joined the List of Woodard Schools.

In 1985 he was elected for five years to the General Synod of the Church of England after several years as chairman of the Diocese of Hereford's revenue committee and honorary treasurer of the diocese, founded in AD 676.

== Christian Action on AIDS ==
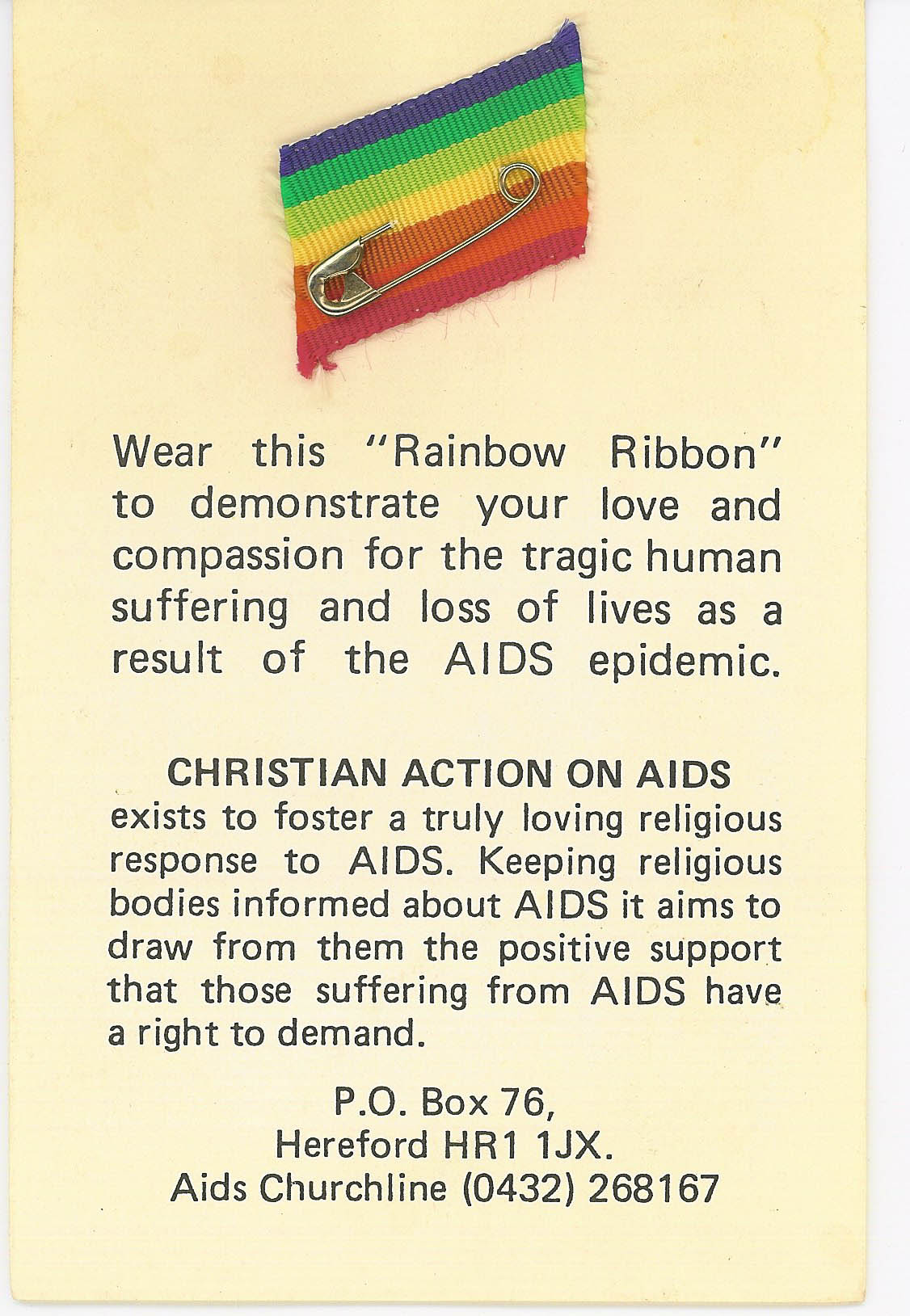

Shortly after the court case of the man with AIDS, Miln was in London attending his first group of sessions of the General Synod. He introduced himself to Robert Runcie, Archbishop of Canterbury, and asked what the church was doing about AIDS. The Archbishop had just returned from San Francisco and seen for himself the devastation caused to the gay community there. They agreed to work together with the Archbishop hoping that "AIDS would not be like cancer - a word only whispered, for by the church talking opening and honestly about AIDS we can take a lead in pastoral care and education".

Conferences were held in the spring of 1986 in California and London when the rainbow AIDS Awareness ribbon was first distributed and became the international symbol of support for people with AIDS for the next five years. A charity, Christian Action on AIDS, was set up on 14 July 1986, supported by church leaders and with Canon John Bowker, Dean of Trinity College, Cambridge, as its president and Barnaby Miln as its chairman.

Christian Action on AIDS was responsible for the working papers on AIDS for the 1988 Lambeth Conference. Once the three-week-long Conference was under way the Archbishop of Canterbury asked Miln to gather support for a last-minute resolution on homosexuality 'to hold the position reached in 1978' in the name of the Bishop of New York, Paul Moore. Resolution 64 called on all bishops of the Anglican Communion to undertake in the next decade a 'deep and dispassionate study of the question of homosexuality'. This was cited in his Preface by the next Archbishop, Dr George Carey, as a reason for the publication in December 1991 of a Statement by the House of Bishops of the General Synod of the Church of England, Issues in Human Sexuality. Whilst continuing to forbid gay sex for the clergy it gave a permission for laity.

For five years Barnaby Miln travelled extensively speaking to church leaders at the British Council of Churches, throughout the worldwide Anglican Communion, Pope John Paul II in Rome and at the World Council of Churches in Geneva and Canberra. In her book God & Mrs Thatcher, Eliza Filby describes Miln as the leading Anglican spokesperson on AIDS.

== World AIDS Day ==
In his powerful speech in a major debate on AIDS in the General Synod of the Church of England on 10 November 1987 he proposed a day each year to remember people with AIDS. In response the Bishop of Gloucester, Rt Rev. John Yates, who was chair of the Synod's Board for Social Responsibility, doubted if anywhere but the United States was yet ready for a special day. But Dr Jonathan Mann at the World Health Organization was a member of the archiepiscopal working party on AIDS for the Lambeth Conference chaired by Barnaby Miln. He was aware of Barnaby Miln's proposal. This planted the seed for Mann and his colleagues, James W. Bunn and Thomas Netter, to set up what became World AIDS Day, held on 1 December each year since 1988. The Bishop of Gloucester and Miln were invited to the inaugural one in Geneva.

== Family ==
Miln married Elizabeth née Barber at St Matthew's Church, Stretton in August 1971. Rosalie was born in March 1974. and Graham in September 1978. The marriage ended in divorce. Miln's mother, Norah Kathleen (1918-2012) was the younger daughter of the Reverend Hugh Douglas Swan (1881-1981) Church of Scotland minister of the ‘Muckle’ Kirk of Peterhead in Aberdeenshire between 1915 and 1951. During World War II she served in the Women's Auxiliary Air Force at Chicksands Priory and Bletchley Park. Her maternal grandfather was James Farmer Brown, (1855-1929) who was honorary superintendent of the Edinburgh Sabbath Free Breakfast and People's Palace Mission from 1874 for more than fifty years. His four-sided pedestal memorial clock was placed in the Cowgate Nursery School Playground in the Cowgate, Edinburgh, in November 1928 and moved in 2008 to the lower level of Tron Square, Edinburgh, following the redevelopment of the Cowgate Nursery School.

== Gay relationships ==
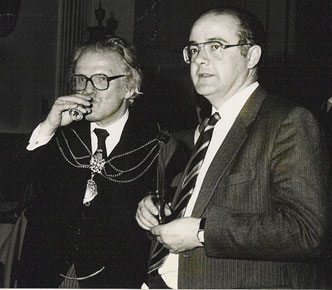
Sir Derek Pattinson and Miln in 1986. Sir Derek is wearing the insignia of Master of the Worshipful Company of Parish Clerks.

Throughout his five years on General Synod, Miln worked with the Reverend Richard Kirker, an openly gay deacon who had been refused priesthood by Dr Robert Runcie and who had, with others, set up the Gay Christian Movement, later the Lesbian and Gay Christian Movement, and became its general secretary.

In 1986 Miln met Derek Pattinson, then secretary-general of the General Synod of the Church of England and chairman of the executive committee of SPCK, formerly the Society for the Promotion of Christian Knowledge. They lived together for some years in a Church-owned flat in Westminster. The then Bishop of London, David Hope, Baron Hope of Thornes, said he assumed "their domestic arrangements were satisfactory and wholesome". Pattinson travelled as part of his work, and took Miln with him on a trip to South Africa in 1990; questions surrounding the propriety of this caused press attention.

Pattinson was knighted in 2000 and ordained in 2001, becoming the Reverend Sir Derek Pattinson. Pattinson died in 2006 and The Times obituary stated that he was survived by Barnaby Miln. The Church Times acknowledged Miln as the chief mourner at the Westminster Abbey burial.

Andrew Brown of the Independent reported that Miln had an affair with a man named David O'Reilly. O'Reilly introduced Miln to drugs, and soon Miln was a heavy user. O'Reilly died after an altercation with a drug dealer in London's King's Cross while buying cocaine as a forty-fifth birthday present for Miln. Miln believed it was murder, but the Crown Prosecution Service declined to bring a case.

== Coming out as gay ==
The General Synod of the Church of England in November 1987 also debated homosexuality in a separate debate. At a meeting the night before, in Church House Westminster, Barnaby Miln declared that he was gay to much applause from the Open Synod Group he was addressing.

He led the opposition and bitterly opposed the motion in a debate on Biblical discipline in matters of sexual morality in the House of Laity at Church House (Church of England) Westminster, on 8 February 1988. In his speech he again declared that he was gay. Peter Tatchell, the gay activist, sitting in Barnaby Miln's support in the public gallery then shouted abuse at those opposing the motion and was escorted out of the building.

In February 1990 Barnaby Miln demanded an emergency debate of the General Synod following the leaking of the Osborne report which claimed homosexuals were treated poorly by the church. But the Archbishops of Canterbury and York, joint presidents, said they were not prepared to admit the motion to the agenda.

Despite this, members of the General Synod voted Barnaby Miln one of the Church of England's representatives on Churches Together in England, and on Churches Together in Britain and Ireland, successor to the British Council of Churches. He was a consultant at the World Council of Churches.

Magistrate colleagues sought Barnaby's removal from the bench but he refused and reluctantly agreed to re-swear the oath of allegiance.

He was not re-elected to the General Synod in October 1990.

== Other charities ==
Whilst on the General Synod Barnaby Miln was a trustee and later chairman of the Langley House Trust for ex-offenders and treasurer of the (British) Churches Council on Alcohol and Drugs. He brought to the latter his experience as a licensing justice in Hereford.

== Jubilee 2000 ==
After his fairtrade work in 1997 he was asked to be Campaigns Director of Jubilee 2000, the developing countries' debt campaign, with the specific responsibility of bringing into its network the British churches and to organise a campaign at the forthcoming meeting in Birmingham, England, of the G8 world leaders. This was to be the human chain of about 70,000 supporters of Jubilee 2000.

Larry Elliott, writing in The Guardian on Monday 27 November 2000 states 'Not only has Jubilee 2000 been comfortably the most successful mass movement of the past 25 years, but it has also shown how the process known as globalisation is nurturing its own opponents.' And Paula Goldman wrote in the Financial Times "the Jubilee 2000 petition holds two world records, according to Guinness World Records: it was the largest petition ever signed (24,391,181 signatures) and the most international (with people from 166 countries signing). Sheer size was no doubt key to the Jubilee petition’s success: when talking to decision-makers, campaigners could rightly claim historic levels of public interest."

== Gay counselling ==
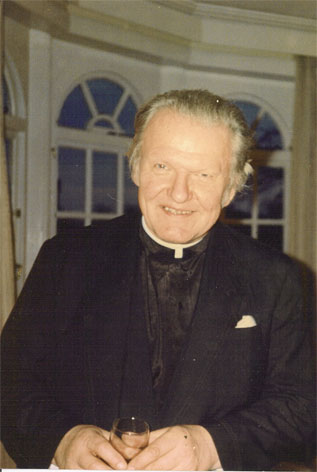
Miln's former partner, the Reverend Sir Derek Pattinson, who died in 2006

Once it was known that he was gay, men from all walks of life confided in him about their own closeted sexuality.

After a visit with Graham Scott to leading cities in the United States looking at their gay quarters, in co-operation with Edinburgh and Lothian Tourist Board he proposed that Edinburgh boost its appeal to gay tourists.

When in 2002 his partner went to live in a nursing home and for the next four years, in Westminster, he set up a fee paying service for anyone wanting to explore their homosexuality and often with fetishes they would find difficult to explain to most people. In 2003 a Sunday People article reported that Miln was running a rent boy S&M club in the flat he had shared with Pattinson. The investigation revealed that Miln had rent boys on his books charging £200 each. Miln told the undercover reporter that senior church figures, Westminster MPs, civil servants, and members of the royal household were amongst the clientele for his services and the monthly orgies he held. According to the People, Miln tried to recruit the reporter as a rent boy and gave him an ecstasy tablet to help him relax. Laboratory tests later confirmed it was the drug. Miln also reportedly offered the journalist unprotected sex, telling him: "There is nothing better than dangerous sex. I could have HIV but at my age I don't care. If I then give it to someone it will be because of their stupidity." The Sunday People commented that it was a strange attitude from Archbishop Robert Runcie's former special adviser on AIDS. A spokesman for the Diocese of London said, "The property is no longer anything to do with us." It is not known whether the conversations were recorded, a usual component of tabloid journalism, but the article was published without apparent complaint. The sex club was briefly referenced in a book by Linda Woodhead and Andrew Brown, a Guardian journalist, in 2016. Miln was also the feature of a BBC One television documentary Men for Hire broadcast on Tuesday 5 April 2005. It was reported that he was seeing between 20 and 30 clients a week for role-play in his "headmaster's study" and that most sessions usually ended with sex. Magazine articles and photographs about his work included Zero in March 2005 and QX in September 2005.

== Classical music editor, ecclesiastical correspondent ==
Since 2007 he has reviewed live classical music and opera in Edinburgh, writes about ecclesiastical matters, and since 2012 has been a co-editor of edinburghguide.com

== St Vincent's Chapel, Edinburgh ==
Barnaby Miln has been the Property Convener of St Vincent's Scottish Episcopal Chapel in Edinburgh's New Town since 2015. He was a member of the General Synod of the Scottish Episcopal Church, one of the provinces of the worldwide Anglican Communion between 2016 and 2023.

== Edinburgh Festival of the Sacred Arts ==
With the Reverend Professor L. Gordon Graham he was the originator of the first week-long Edinburgh Festival of the Sacred Arts in the Fringe in August 2018, held by St Vincent's Scottish Episcopal Chapel. Sacred Arts Festivals held in August 2019 and 2021 at St Vincent's were organised by The Edinburgh Sacred Arts Foundation of which he and the Reverend Professor Gordon Graham were the initial Trustees.

Since 2022 the Festival of the Sacred Arts has held events in many of Edinburgh city centre cathedrals and churches including St Giles' Cathedral, Canongate Kirk, St Mary's Cathedral, Edinburgh (Catholic), St Mary's Cathedral, Edinburgh (Episcopal), Greyfriars Kirk, Magdalen Chapel, Mansfield Place Church, Old Saint Paul's Church, Sacred Heart, Edinburgh, St Columba's-by-the-Castle, St Cuthbert's Parish Church, St John's, Edinburgh, St James, Goldenacre and Church of St Michael and All Saints, Edinburgh as well as St Vincent's Scottish Episcopal Chapel.

The Edinburgh Sacred Arts Foundation became a Scottish Charitable Incorporated Organisation SC051554 in January 2022. Its charitable purposes are the advancement of the arts, heritage, culture or science. The Organisation's purposes are to support, and stimulate artistic activity that draws on the rich Christian inheritance in music, visual, literary, material and performing arts. To accomplish its primary purpose in a way that contributes significantly to the cultural life of Edinburgh during the summer Festivals.
