= Edinburgh Royal Choral Union =

Choir in Edinburgh, Scotland

- Choir
- Former name: Edinburgh Choral Union
- Origin: Edinburgh, Scotland
- Founded: 1858, (168 years ago)
- Genre: Classical Music
- Members: c. 125
- Music director: Michael Bawtree
- Chief conductor: Michael Bawtree
- Choir admission: Audition
- Headquarters: Edinburgh
- Rehearsal space: Augustine United Church
- Concert hall: Usher Hall and others
- Website: https://ercu.org.uk/

Edinburgh Royal Choral Union (ERCU) is a choir based in Edinburgh, Scotland. It was founded in 1858. and given a royal charter in 1911. It performs concerts throughout the year including, often at Usher Hall. It has performed Handel's Messiah on the 2nd January every year since 1888 (except 2021 due to the covid-19 pandemic). As of 2026 the choir rehearses at Augustine United Church. The choir is a registered charity in Scotland, and a registered company.

== Membership ==
Notable past members, (honorary) presidents and (honorary) vice-presidents include Sir Thomas Clark, 1st Baronet, Edward Ramsay, James Falshaw, and Herbert Oakeley.

The current Honorary President is Martyn Brabbins.

The current Chorus Director is Michael Bawtree.

In 2000 the choir set up the Edinburgh Youth Choir.

== Notable concerts and tours ==
On 24 May 1938 ERCU performed at Empire Day Concert at Royal Albert Hall alongside other choirs and musicians in front of George VI and Queen Elizabeth the Queen Mother.

On 9 November 2009 ERCU sang with Andrea Bocelli at the SEC Centre, Glasgow and again on 20th October 2019 at OVO Hydro alongside the Royal Philharmonic Orchestra.

In 2013 ERCU performed with Tallaght Choral Society and National Symphony Orchestra (Ireland) at the National Concert Hall, Dublin, Ireland.

In 2014 ERCU performed as part of the Usher Hall's 100 year anniversary alongside the Royal Scottish National Orchestra and John Kitchen playing the organ.

On 7 December 2025 ERCU performed with the Brussels Choral Society at Centre for Fine Arts, Brussels with a reciprocal concert held at Usher Hall on 15th March 2026.
