= Fairtrade Fortnight =

Fairtrade Fortnight is an annual promotional campaign organized and funded by the Fairtrade Foundation to increase awareness of Fairtrade products. It makes use of volunteers who support the goals of Fairtrade but who may also be committed to the more general concepts of fair trade, ethical trading or concerned by development issues. The concept was pioneered by the Fairtrade Foundation in the United Kingdom, initially held in 1997 in Scotland and created by Barnaby Miln.

== History ==
The inaugural national launch was on 12 February 1997 at Augustine United Church on Edinburgh's George IV Bridge by Lady Marion Fraser, chairman of the charity Christian Aid. She broke a bar of Fairtrade chocolate to launch the event. It turned out to be a successful campaign to get every supermarket throughout Scotland to stock Fairtrade products. Barnaby Miln sent supporters of Christian Aid Scotland, SCIAF, Traidcraft, Oxfam and the World Development Movement a list of 85 supermarkets in Scotland's cities and larger towns, and encouraged during the Fortnight to go and ask for Fairtrade products.

Fairtrade Fortnight spread to the rest of the United Kingdom the following year; today, Fairtrade Fortnights are held in several countries, most notably Ireland, Canada, Australia and New Zealand. Awareness raising and promotion of Fairtrade certified products to the public are the main objectives of the Fortnight.

Usually events held during the fortnight include: Fetes, Fairs, Fairtrade food and drink tastings, Fashion shows, and Community, school, college and university events. These events are often supported by local authorities and governments, Fairtrade Steering Groups, dozens of charities and ATOs, all seeking to ensure that the local populace purchase fair and ethically traded goods.

As part of Fairtrade Fortnight, Fairtrade Foundation brings co-operative farmers to the UK to "tour schools, and TV studios and radio stations to provide a human face and voice to issues of trade justice".

During Fairtrade Fortnight in 2012, the Fairtrade Foundation adopted a theme of Take a Step for Fairtrade, encouraging shoppers to try one new Fairtrade-labelled product.

Fairtrade Fortnight in 2026 will take place from Monday 21st September to Sunday 4th October,
