= Metropolitan Community Church of Edinburgh =

Coordinates: 55°56′51″N 3°11′28″W

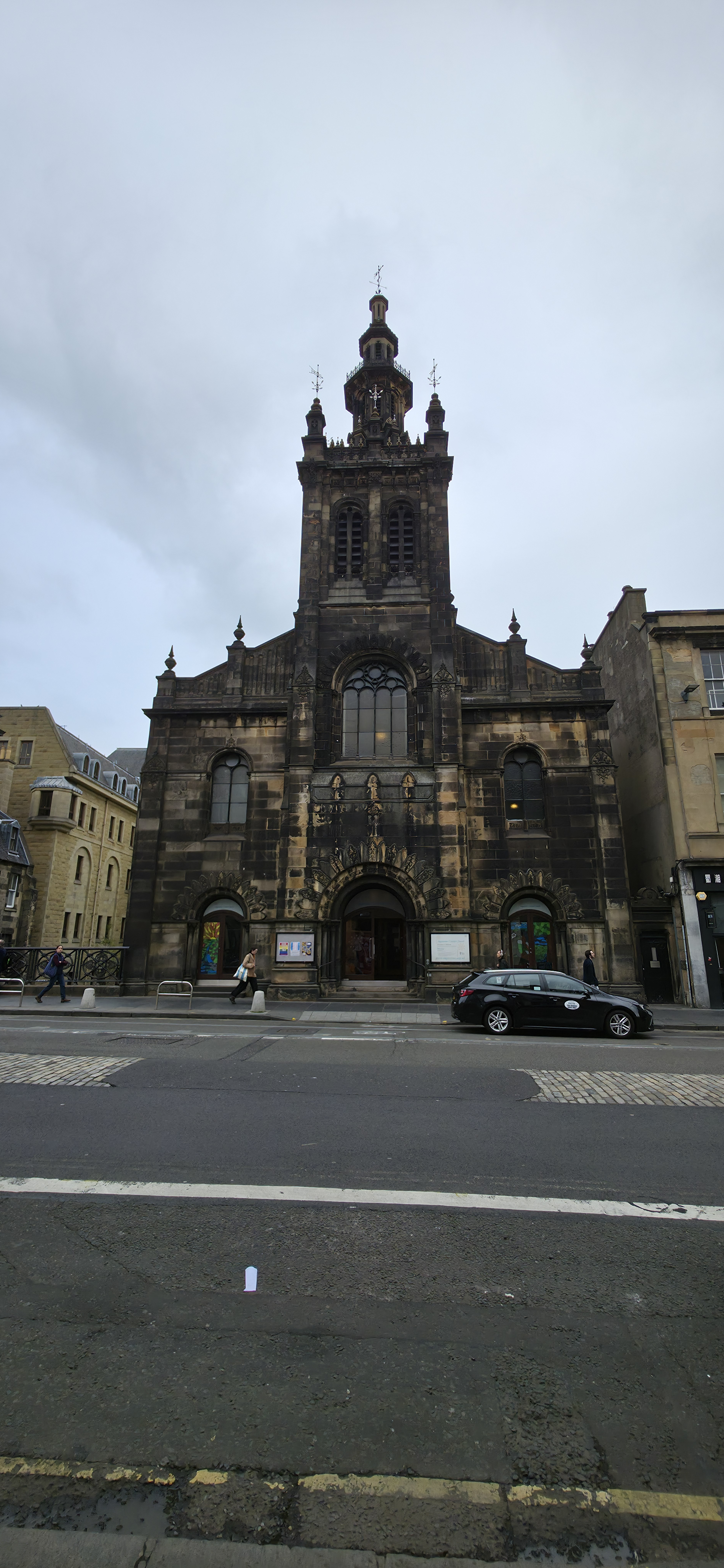
MCC of Edinburgh in September 2025

The Metropolitan Community Church of Edinburgh, also known as Holy Trinity Metropolitan Community Church, was the Edinburgh congregation of the Metropolitan Community Church (MCC), an international Christian denomination founded in 1968 to serve the LGBT community, from 1995 to 2009. The church has now ceased worshipping independently and has merged with Augustine United Church.

== Foundation ==
On 17 June 1995, the first Pride Scotland March and Festival was held in Edinburgh. Reverend Jim McManus, a pastoral team member of MCC Newcastle, Reverend Roy Beaney, European District Coordinator, and other MCC members visited Edinburgh and organised a stall at the festival, followed by a small worship service in the LGBT Centre in Broughton Street.

McManus tried to use contacts made at this event to form an MCC group in Edinburgh. An article appeared in The Scotsman and Michelle Russell was interviewed on BBC Radio Scotland. At a meeting on 15 July 1995 in the LGBT Centre, the dozen or so attendees decided to form a congregation, with a first worship service taking place at the centre the following day. On 2 August 1995, during the MCC General Conference in Atlanta, Georgia, an Interim Development Group was formed, with McManus appointed as Pastor.

== Development ==
The congregation initially worshipped in the LGBT Centre, but from October 1995 moved to larger premises in the University of Edinburgh Chaplaincy, at the invitation of the university chaplain, Reverend Iain Whyte.

Two observers were sent to the MCC's European District Conference in November 1995. The congregation adopted a constitution on 17 November 1995, establishing Holy Trinity Metropolitan Community Church, Edinburgh, as a parish extension of MCC Newcastle, with McManus elected pastor. The first church members were accepted on 16 February 1996.

In 1996, the congregation moved again to the Edinburgh Quaker Meeting House, and began meeting twice a month. In June 1996, the congregation took part in the second Pride Scotia in Glasgow. New leadership was appointed at the second annual congregational in April 1997, with the support of Reverend Doreen Shambrook representing the MCC European District.

After a development weekend in January 1998 at Scottish Churches House, the congregation agreed to hold weekly services in Augustine United Church. It merged with Augustine United Church in January 2010.

== Campaigns ==
The church was active in several social justice campaigns, including the campaign to repeal Section 28, the campaign for same-sex marriage, and Make Poverty History. The Church gave oral evidence and lodged a Petition to the Scottish Parliament when legislation was being considered on civil partnerships in the United Kingdom, and also sought the right to constitute civil partnerships in a religious context, unsuccessfully.

In 2001, at the MCC General Conference in Toronto, Reverend Troy Perry awarded MCC Edinburgh the Founders Award for their work on social justice issues.

== See also ==
- LGBT-welcoming church programs
