= Edinburgh Youth Choir =

The Edinburgh Youth Choir or eyc is a choir based in Edinburgh, Scotland and intended for members aged between 14 and 24.

The choir was established by Jane Kirk and Dorcas Owen in 2000 as the junior choir of the Edinburgh Royal Choral Union, with the principal aim of providing vocal training through a variety of musical styles.

The choir rehearses at Augustine United Church on George IV Bridge. The current musical director is James Slimings, who replaced Wayne Weaver at the start of the 2014–15 season. Accompanist Joanna Stewart has been with eyc since 2003.

The choir performs regularly throughout the year. Annual events include a spring concert at Edinburgh's Canongate Kirk, Christmas with the Choral and performances at the Scottish National Portrait Gallery and National Museum of Scotland.

Other projects have included joint concerts with ERCU at St Cuthbert's Church and the McEwan Hall, the World premiere of Shadow Aspect by Judith Bingham and a recording for BBC Radio 2's Sunday Half Hour.
