= Derek Pattinson =

British Anglican civil servant (1930–2006)

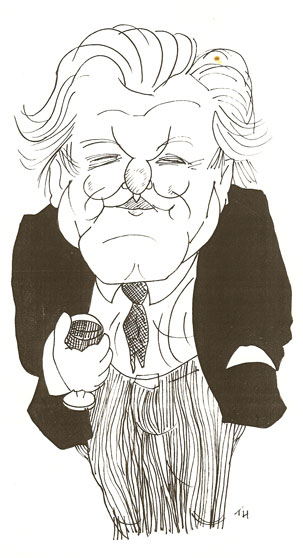
Sketch of Pattinson

Sir William Derek Pattinson (31 March 1930 – 10 October 2006) was secretary-general of the General Synod of the Church of England from 1972 until 1990.

== Early life ==
Pattinson was born at Barrow-in-Furness, the only child of civil servant Thomas William Pattinson and Elizabeth (née Burgess), a primary school teacher. He was educated at the County Grammar School, Whitehaven, and at The Queen's College, Oxford, where, despite having won the Stanhope Historical Essay Prize, he obtained only Second Class in the Final Honour School of Modern History. He received the degree of Bachelor of Arts in 1952 and Master of Arts in 1956. He had been a member of the Church of England since his childhood and, during his time at Oxford, he moved from the low church tradition to Anglo-Catholicism. An alternative version states that he grew up an Anglo-Catholic but that his religious enthusiasm waned at Oxford and he returned to the church when working as a civil servant.

== Career ==
=== Civil service ===
He entered HM Civil Service, working in the Inland Revenue from 1952 until 1962 and HM Treasury from 1962 to 1965, returning in 1965 as assistant secretary at the Inland Revenue and then transferring back to HM Treasury in 1968.

=== General Synod ===
In 1970 Gerald Ellison, then Bishop of Chester, suggested that he should apply for the position of Associate Secretary-General of the General Synod of the Church of England, with the intention that, if appointed, he should succeed as Secretary-General on the retirement of Sir John Scott. He was appointed to the Associate's position and he was Secretary-General from 1972 until 1990. It is said that he enjoyed better relations with the Anglo-Catholic archbishops Michael Ramsey and Robert Runcie than he did with the evangelical Donald Coggan, for reasons of both Churchmanship and administrative style.

He was not enthusiastic about the ordination of women but regarded it as inevitable and was quite happy with women priests when they were eventually ordained. He was a keen promoter of black and other ethnic minority members of the synod. He was also a key figure in the establishment of the Diocese of Gibraltar in Europe.

He was first touched by scandal in 1987 in connection with the Preface to Crockford's Clerical Directory, written anonymously by his friend the Revd Canon Gareth Bennett, Dean of Divinity of New College, Oxford, who committed suicide as a result of the controversy it caused. Pattinson was responsible for commissioning the Preface and was thought to have failed to predict the outcome of publishing it. The Standing Committee of the General Synod decided that he was without blame in the incident.

Shortly before his retirement in 1990 he was appointed Knight Bachelor by the Queen in the Queen's Birthday Honours, and he received the accolade on 6 November 1990. At this point he was thinking about ordination and, since Church of England clergy are not allowed to receive the accolade, it has been suggested that it was impolitic of him to accept the honour. However, correspondence with Buckingham Palace in November 1991 accepted Sir Derek's use of the accolade without setting a precedent for others.

A less formal honour marking his retirement was the singing, in the General Synod, of a variation on the Major-General's Song from The Pirates of Penzance with the line, "He was the very model of a Secretary-General".

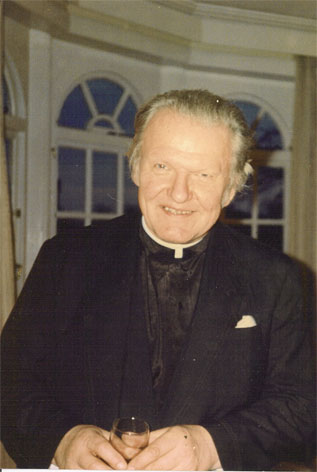
The Reverend Sir Derek Pattinson photographed shortly after his priesting in 1992.

=== Ordination ===
Despite not having attended a bishops' selection conference, he was accepted for ordination. He trained for two terms at St Deiniol's Library and was ordained deacon in 1991 by Graham Leonard. The service was threatened with interruption by a journalist from The Daily Mail who wanted to know whether Sir Derek was gay. Following a further term at the College of the Resurrection he was ordained priest in 1992 by David Hope. Both services took place at St Gabriel's Church in Pimlico, in central London where he was non-stipendiary priest from 1991 until 2000.

== Private life ==
On 30 November 1992 Barnaby Miln, a homosexual activist, Justice of the Peace, and former member of the House of Laity of the General Synod of the Church of England, was asked to afternoon tea with the Bishop of London who asked about Sir Derek's drinking problem following reports he had received. They agreed, that for the sake of Barnaby Miln's well-being, he and Sir Derek should no longer live together. The bishop thanked Barnaby Miln for looking after Sir Derek and assisted him in finding alternative accommodation. The bishop arranged that Barnaby Miln take Sir Derek, on 1 December 1992, to a consultant in Harley Street in the expectation that he would be sent to a clinic for specialist treatment. The consultant failed to persuade Sir Derek who, the following day, attended a local clergy chapter at Westminster Abbey which happened to be attended by the bishop. Seeing the state he was in, on 3 December 1992 the bishop wrote to Sir Derek suspending his licence for an initial period of six weeks.

On 4 December 1992, The Independent claimed that Sir Derek had been living with Barnaby Miln.

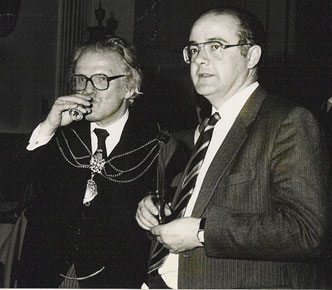
Sir Derek Pattinson and Barnaby Miln JP photographed in 1986. Sir Derek is wearing the insignia of Master of the Worshipful Company of Parish Clerks.

Barnaby Miln returned in September 2000 to live with and care for Sir Derek whose health had deteriorated. In the last edition of Who's Who published before Sir Derek's death Barnaby Miln was named as his partner, and was the executor of his estate.

Pattinson was a Freemason, initiated in 1960 in the Kaisar-i-Hind Lodge (London), and became a Royal Arch Mason in 1962 in the Oxford & Cambridge University Chapter (London). He was an officer of the United Grand Lodge of England from 1979. He was a member of the Athenaeum Club and the Savile Club. He became a Freeman of the City of London in 1973 and was a member of the Woolmen's Company and of the Parish Clerks' Company, of which he was Master 1986/7.

== Death and legacy ==
Sir Derek was diagnosed with hydrocephalus in 2000. He died in London on 10 October 2006 and his ashes are buried in Westminster Abbey. He had held numerous other appointments including membership of the Archbishops' Commission on Church and State (1966–70) and the British Council of Churches (1972–90), the vice-chairmanship of the Grosvenor Chapel Committee (1973–81), the chairmanship of Liddon Trustees (1972–2001), the William Temple Association, and of the English Friends of the Anglican Centre in Rome (1985–2001), and the principalship of the Society of the Faith (1992–2001). He was Churchwarden of St Michael's, Cornhill and Parish Clerk of St Luke's, Old Street.
