= Gartons Limited =

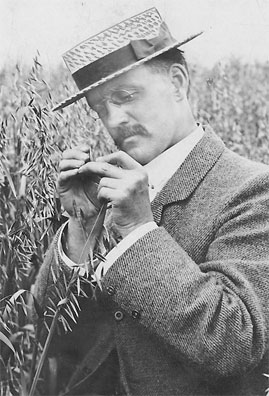
John Garton

Dr John Garton, of the firm of Garton Brothers of Newton-le-Willows in the United Kingdom was the Originator of Scientific Farm Plant Breeding. He is credited as the first scientist to show that the common grain crops and many other plants are self-fertilizing. He also invented the process of multiple cross-fertilization of crop plants.

In 1898 the business became known as Gartons Limited and, under the inspired commercial leadership of George Peddie Miln, was to become the British Empire's largest plant breeding and seed company.

A public company from the start, its shares were traded on the London Stock Exchange from 1947.

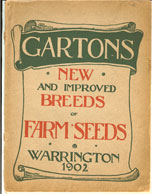
Gartons Limited 1902 catalogue

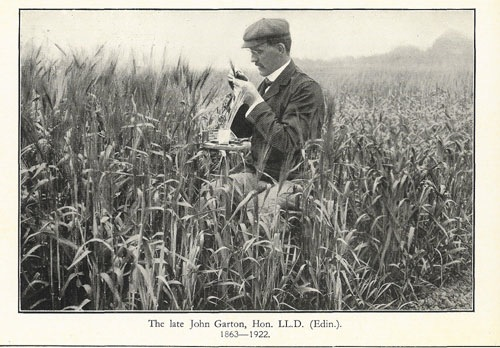
John Garton

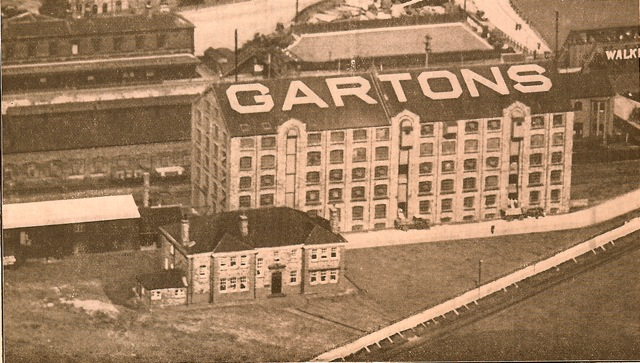
Gartons Limited of Warrington

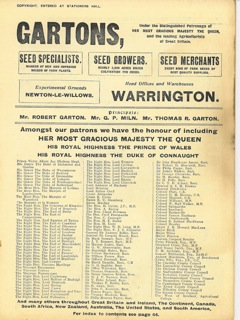
Patronage 1901

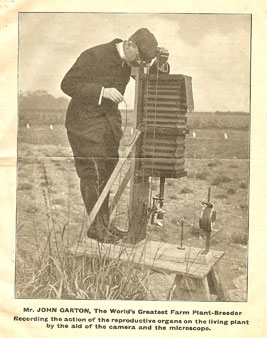
John Garton at work

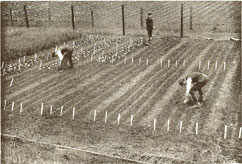
Clover trials, 1902

== History of the business ==
John Garton and his two brothers, Robert and Thomas, were in business with their father, Peter, in Golborne and Newton-le-Willows in Lancashire, England, as corn and agricultural merchants.

As a young man, John Garton (1863–1922), was the first to understand that whilst some agricultural plants were self-pollinating, others were cross-pollinating. He began experimenting with the artificial cross pollination firstly of cereal plants, then herbage species and root crops.

He attracted the friendship and encouragement of a young Scottish seedsman, George Peddie Miln (1861–1928) who had trained in Dundee and was seed manager of Dicksons Limited of Chester.

Knowing he had developed a far reaching new technique in plant breeding John Garton began to carry out many thousands of controlled crosses on fields at the family farm in Newton-le-Willows. He and his colleagues tried in 1889 to interest the UK government's new Board of Agriculture in the invention they called Scientific Farm Plant Breeding. But this was to no avail.

=== Commercial start ===
Robert and John Garton made a commercial start as R. & J. Garton. They launched their first variety, 'Abundance' oat, in 1892.

Generous publicity followed in the press, together with the publication of articles by botanists in the Journal of the Royal Agricultural Society of England, and in the Transactions of the Royal Highland and Agricultural Society of Scotland in 1894 and 1898. Professor Robert Wallace (1853–1939) of the University of Edinburgh said 'Under the system originated by Mr John Garton an infinite number of new and distinct breeds of oats, barleys, wheats, clovers and grasses have been produced'.

In 1898 a public company was launched, Gartons Limited. It was based in Warrington. Many of the 600 or so subscribers for £50,000 cumulative preference shares of 6% rising to 10% were farmers.

Robert and John Garton agreed to continue to work for the company for five years for £500 and to receive the entire ordinary share capital of the new company of £50,000.

George Peddie Miln joined the company as managing director, together with Robert Garton, Thomas R. Garton, Thomas Baxter and Arthur Smith as directors.

It rapidly became the United Kingdom's best known plant breeding and seed company, and also exported seeds widely.

=== The Garton Lectureship at Edinburgh University ===
In 1900 an endowment was made to found the Garton Lectureship in Indian and Colonial Agriculture at the University of Edinburgh. The Garton Lectureship still exists as a biennial award to promising young lecturers in the School of Agriculture but is without emoluments and is no longer tied to colonial agriculture.

=== Publicity in USA ===
Noel Kingsbury writes:

From the late nineteenth century on, seed companies began to play an increasingly important, if not dominant, role in breeding non-cereal crops and a major role in producing varieties for market gardening and for private growers. The production of new cereals was a somewhat different matter – the fact that they were so vitally important for national food supplies and involved large-scale and long-term work made it more likely that they would be the concern of government. There were exceptions though, one being the family firm of Gartons of Warrington, Lancashire, in the north of England. Their production of cereals – oats in particular – was appreciated as internationally important during the latter quarter of the nineteenth century and the early years of the twentieth; (The American wheat breeder) Mark Carleton visited them in 1898 and was reportedly astonished at their work, Garton varieties were widely exported throughout the British Empire (then by far and away the world's largest political unit) and the United States.

"That private companies could be so effective in breeding cereal grains indicated that there was no link of necessity between their improvement and the publicly funded research that was to so dominate this sector over so much of the next century."

In 1903 Professor Willet M. Hays (1859–1927) of the Agricultural Experiment Station in Minnesota, USA said 'No one has done more brilliant work in Agricultural Plant Breeding than Messrs. Garton, and this is from now on to be recognised.'

=== Attempted intellectual property donation ===
The introduction to their 1899 Spring Catalogue reads:

Our original idea for the dissemination of the seed of these new breeds as the stocks became sufficiently large for the purpose, was through some public body as in the form of an annual free seed distribution upon similar lines to the free seed distributions carried out by the Governments of the United States, Canada, and several of the British Colonies.

On three successive occasions we approached Her Majesty's Government with this object in view, the first occasion being on the formation of the Board of Agriculture, in 1889, when we offered to hand over the whole of the valuable results, providing that body would undertake their dissemination and the continuance of the work, either in the form of an annual free seed distribution or at current market price.

Upon the last occasion our offer was accompanied by letters and reports from all the leading Agricultural Professors, Botanists, and Scientists in the Kingdom, setting forth the national benefit which would accrue from the dissemination of the results in the form we had suggested. The final reply of Her Majesty's Government, however, was that whilst fully recognising the value of the work, owing to there being no precedent upon which to act in such a matter, they were unable to avail themselves of the offer. This was much to be regretted for had our ideas been carried into effect the British farmer would have been placed in immediate possession of important results, which in the hands of a Public Company would not reach him for many years.

Our efforts in this direction not having been successful, and as we were not in a position to undertake the work of distribution ourselves, we have placed it in the lands of a Public Company, and we trust that the continued efforts made by us on behalf of the British farmer will be fully appreciated by him, through his support of the Company responsible for the distribution of the seed of our new breeds of agricultural plants

R. & J. Garton''

=== Crop innovations ===
The firm's first historic introduction was 'Abundance' oat, the world's first agricultural plant variety bred from a controlled cross, introduced to commerce in 1892.

Among the other 170 crop varieties that Gartons bred and introduced to commerce were:

- 'Standwell' barley, introduced in 1898, the first barley bred from a controlled cross.
- 'White Monarch' wheat, introduced in 1899, the first wheat bred from a controlled cross.
- 'Invincible' barley, introduced in 1899, the first crop plant control crossed for disease resistance.
- Perennialized red clover, introduced in 1898, the first controlled cross clover.
- Perennialized Italian ryegrass, introduced in 1907, the first controlled cross pasture grass.
- 'Apex' winter wheat, introduced in 1967, the first wheat to be granted plant breeders' rights in the United Kingdom.

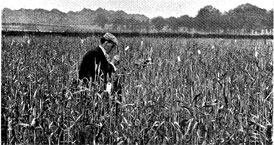
John Garton

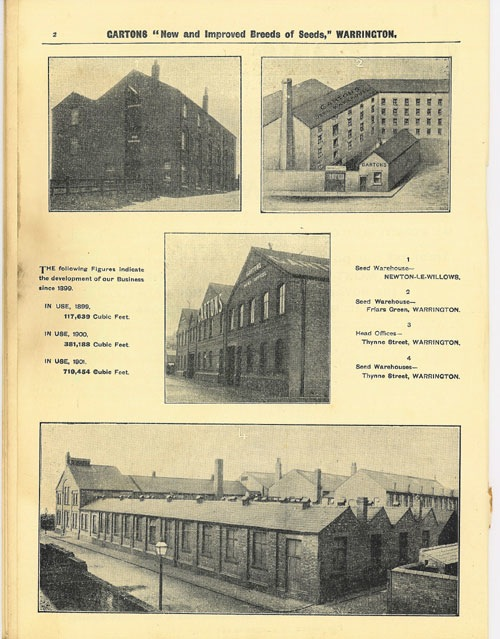
Garton's

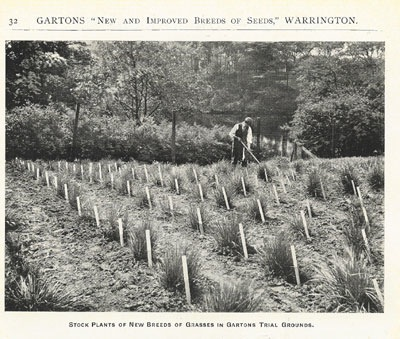
Grass plant trials, 1902

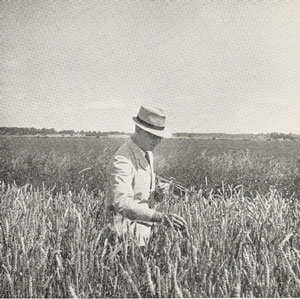
Thomas Edward Miln at work in a field of seed wheat, 1955

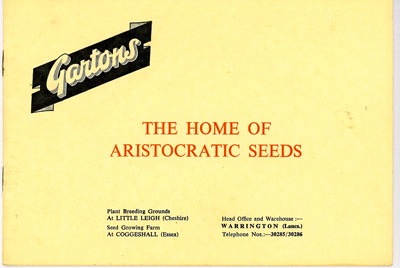
Garton's Aristocratic Seeds

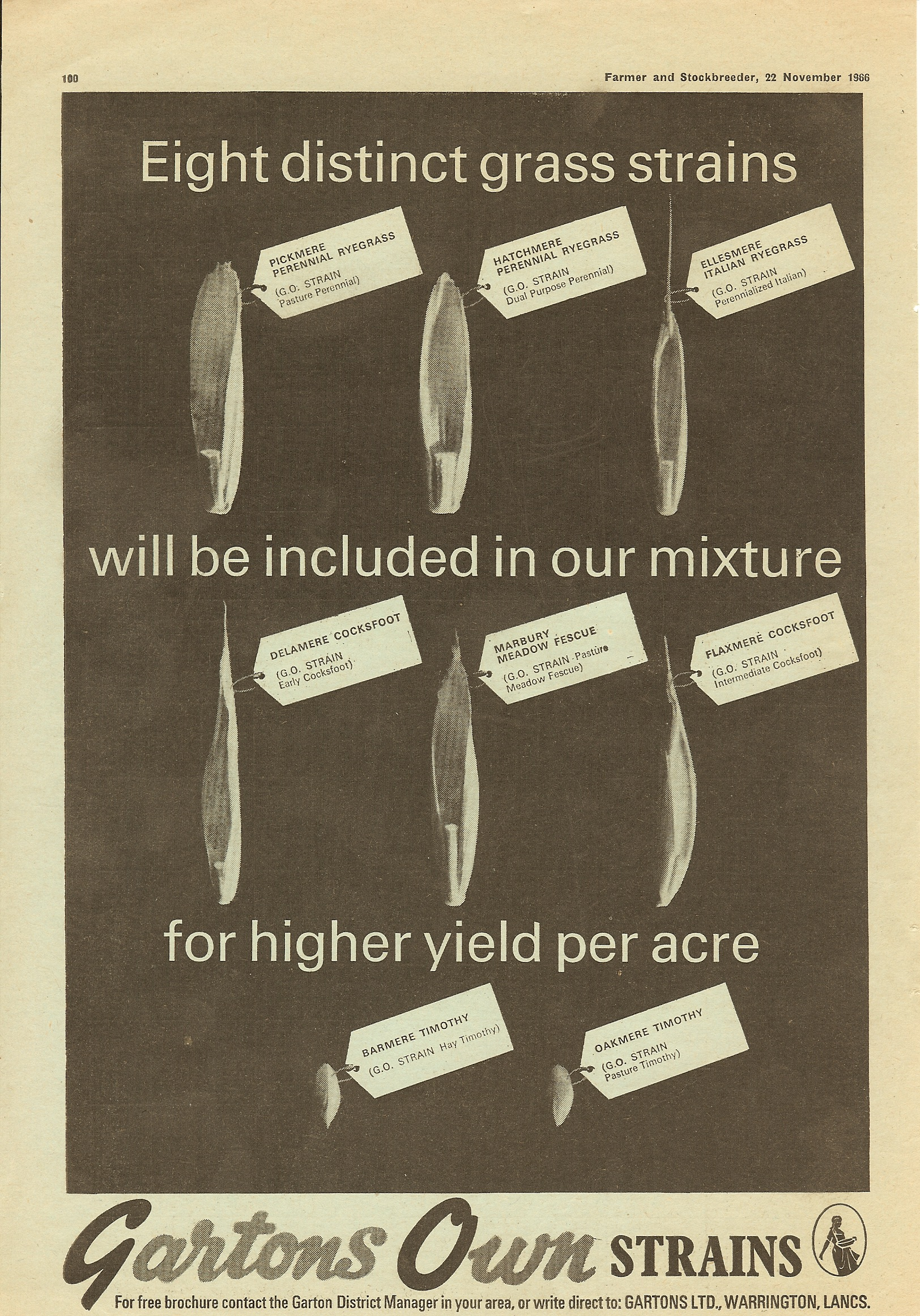
Garton's advertisement

=== John Garton's honorary doctorate ===
On 23 March 1922 the Senatus Academicus of the University of Edinburgh offered to confer the honorary doctorate of LL.D on John Garton shortly before his death, which he duly accepted. At its meeting on 6 July 1922 the Senatus Academicus learned that John Garton had died.

The programme and report of the Graduation Ceremony held on 21 July 1922 reads

The Senatus Academicus recently conferred the Honorary Degree of Doctor of Laws upon the late John Garton, who duly accepted it. The Degree would have been formally conferred on the present occasion but for his lamented death. Mr Garton invented the process of multiple cross fertilisation of crop plants and has been the means in a great measure of revolutionising field culture by producing hundreds of new and improved varieties which have greatly increased the yields of all the common crops of the farm. The achievement proved to be of immense national importance during the War.

Mr Garton first showed that the common grain crops and many other crop plants are self-fertilising. Up till that time they were generally believed to be fertilised by wind or insects. Mr Garton’s results got in crossing different species of grasses helped to develop the modern conception of species.

Twenty-two tears ago Mr Garton provided the means to establish the Garton Lectures on Colonial and Indian Agriculture, and subsequently he permanently endowed them as an integral part of the work of the Chair of Agriculture.

=== Plant breeding grounds ===
The plant breeding grounds were initially at Newton-le-Willows but moved to Acton Grange, two and a half miles south west of Warrington before settling in about 1930 at Little Leigh near Northwich in Cheshire. A seed development farm was located in Essex, and root crop trials were located on farms in the north of England and in Scotland. Traditionally groups of farmers were invited in mid-summer to inspect the plant breeding grounds and be entertained by the company.

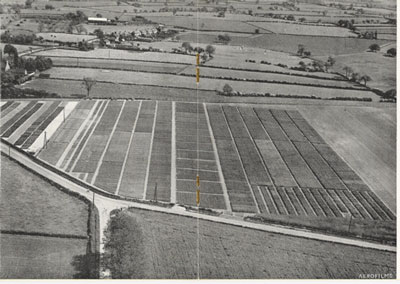

Initially the Seed Warehouse for cleaning and distributing seed was in Newton-le-Willows but moved to Friars Green in Warrington in 1899 by which time the offices were at Thynne Street, Warrington. A purpose-built seven story Seed Warehouse and separate Head Office were built at Arpley, Warrington in 1910. There was an L. M. S. railway siding into the Seed Warehouse. On 25 April 1912 the Seed Warehouse burned down but quickly rebuilt largely by the same builders. Seed cleaning machinery, some unique to the company, ensured the purity of the product. As time went by fewer seeds were 'picked' or cleaned by hand by upwards of one hundred staff as machinery became more sophisticated. Across the top of roof of the warehouse was the company's name which had to be disguised during wartime.

From the beginning Gartons Limited tested its seeds for purity and germination at its own seed testing laboratories in Warrington. The 1920 Seeds Act, for the first time, made testing and declaring for purity and germination a legal requirement for all seed companies. The Official Seed Testing Station was created in 1917, firstly in Victoria Street in Westminster, London and then in 1921 within the newly formed National Institute of Agricultural Botany in Cambridge. Larger seed companies including Gartons Limited were licensed to carry out their own purity and germination testing.

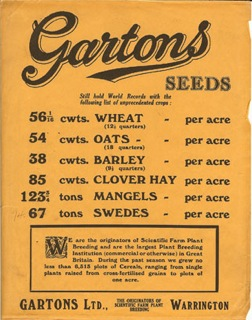

=== Commercial success and competition ===
Gartons Limited was the United Kingdom's only major agricultural plant breeding company. But this caused them difficulties as early as in their Spring 1900 seed catalogue where a paragraph of the introduction reads:

It has come to our knowledge that nearly all the New Breeds introduced by us up to the present time have been renamed by various dealers and are being offered by them under different names. Although the honesty of this conduct is more than questionable, we are resigned for the present to regard it as a novel form of flattery, but we strongly recommend all those who wish to secure our Seeds to order them direct from us, as they cannot be procured from any other genuine source.

After the Great War (1914–1918) the United Kingdom government funded cereal breeding at the Plant Breeding Institute at Cambridge which had been founded in 1912, and funded the setting up of plant breeding stations in Edinburgh (1921), Aberystwyth (1919) and in Glasnevin, Northern Ireland in competition with Gartons Limited.

The 1960 Report of the Committee on Transactions in Seeds set up by Parliament entitled Plant Breeders' Rights stated that whilst two thirds of breeding work was by then carried out by government organisations, one third was in the hands of private breeders. And yet the only non-government funded agricultural crop plant breeding, research and testing establishment visited by the committee was to Gartons Limited. The United Kingdom's Plant Varieties and Seeds Act 1964 allowed plant breeders to fully protect and be rewarded for their introductions. The last variety bred by Gartons, 'Apex' wheat, was the first British bred wheat to be awarded plant breeders rights in 1967 under this legislation.

=== Chairmen and directors ===
The eldest of the three Garton brothers, Robert Garton, was the first chairman of Gartons Limited. He died in February 1950, aged 91, a widower with no children. He was succeeded by the youngest brother, Thomas R. Garton, who died in May 1956. His son, John, was chairman from August 1963 until September 1965. Dr John Garton, the middle of the three brothers, was never, a director.

Nine members (four generations) of the Miln family were involved with the business over a period of seventy five years.

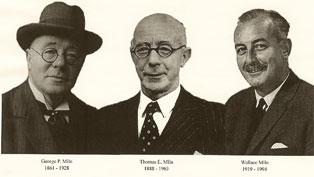

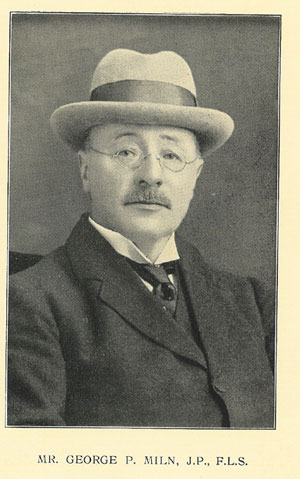
George Peddie Miln

Born at Linlathen, Broughty Ferry in 1861, George Peddie Miln trained in a Dundee seed warehouse, the traditional Scottish training for a young man with ambition in the seed trade. He moved to Chester and ran one of its old established seed merchants before joining Gartons Limited as its first managing director in 1898. He was a member of Her Majesty's Board of Agriculture Seeds Advisory Council during the first World War. Both the Seeds Act 1920 and the formation of the National Institute of Agricultural Botany came about with his considerable encouragement during his three-year presidency of the Seed Trade Association of the United Kingdom. Of his eleven children, five trained in the seed trade. He was a Justice of the Peace in the City of Chester, a Fellow of the Linnean Society and a member of the Council of the Royal Agricultural Society of England. He died aged 68 following an unsuccessful operation.

When George P. Miln died in 1928 he was succeeded as managing director by his eldest son, Thomas Edward Miln (1890–1963) who for over twenty five years was chairman of the Retail Committee of the Seed Trade Association of the United Kingdom which proudly kept its independence from government control during World War II. A plant breeder as well as a businessman he is credited with the introduction of the sugar beet crop to UK agriculture.

When Gartons Limited became a public quoted company on the London Stock Exchange in 1947 Thomas Edward Miln entered into a further ten year employment contract as managing director, even though he was already 59, such was his reputation. Both his sons, Wallace and George, joined him in the business.

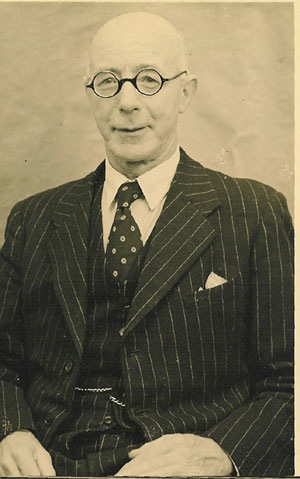
T.E. Miln

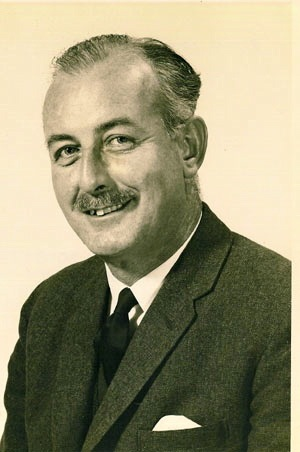
Wallace Miln

Thomas Edward Miln was succeeded in 1961 by his elder son, Wallace Miln (1919–1994) also a skilled plant breeder and seed analyst. Wallace Miln was one of the three founders of the British Association of Plant Breeders at the time of the introduction of the United Kingdom's Plant Varieties and Seeds Act 1964. He was twice President of the Seed Trade Association of United Kingdom. He left Gartons Limited in 1973 to join his elder son, Barnaby Miln, who had trained at Gartons and later with Northrup-King in Minneapolis before setting up his own seed business at Bodenham in Herefordshire.

From 1947 Gartons Limited's shares were quoted on the London Stock Exchange. The company's profits for the previous seven years had averaged £48,940. In 1949 the profit of £75,340 was the highest ever recorded by the company.

In 1965 Peter Darlington became chairman of Gartons Limited. In a dramatic change of direction in 1967 Gartons Limited ceased retailing seeds directly to farmers. Instead a new brand was created, Gartons GROplan, and marketing became wholesale through agricultural merchants throughout the United Kingdom.

In 1970 Charles Hoskins became Production Director. Charles Hoskins had previously been with Twyford Seeds and spent twelve years as General Manager of Conder Seeds having under the directorship of his brother Peter Hoskins been responsible for the inception of this profitable and successful business.

Decline following Acquisition of Gartons Groplan By Agricultural Holdings (Hurst Gunson)

Gartons GROplan was sold to Agricultural Holdings Company Limited (Hurst Gunson) in 1971, but Gartons Limited continued as a plant breeding company. Peter Darlington immediately resigned from Gartons Groplan to concentrate on his responsibilities with Gartons Limited and Peter Darlington Partners. Wallace Miln and Charles Hoskins both left Gartons Groplan following the take over by Agricultural Holdings Limited (Hurst Gunson). As already stated Wallace Miln joined his son Barnaby at JB Seeds and Charles Hoskins joined Sinclair McGill, the highly respected Boston based Plant Breeders and Seed Specialists, in 1974 and was appointed Production Director at Sinclair McGill (East) in 1978

Bob Beeton was another senior employee to leave following the take over by Agricultural Holdings Limited (Hurst Gunson.) Bob Beeton had been Sales Manager at Garton Groplan and in 1974 joined Elsoms Spalding, the Spalding-based Plant Breeders and Seed Specialists, as Area Sales Manager for East Anglia. Elsoms Spalding remains a family company to this day. Elsoms Spalding still enjoys a justifiable excellent reputation.

Gartons plc, as it became known, ceased trading in 1983. The seed warehouse at Bridge Foot, Warrington, which had dominated the town centre skyline since 1910, was demolished in October 1986. A hotel was built on the site.

== The Garton System of Plant Breeding ==
These Explanatory Notes come from the Gartons Seed Catalogue for Spring 1900:

To those who are not acquainted with the botanical construction of plants it may be well to explain that plants possess generative organs, which correspond to those of the male and female in the animal kingdom. In the animal kingdom, progeny is derived from the mating of different animals of the same breed; in the vegetable kingdom the rule is that the seed is produced through the agency of the generative organs growing together on the same plant. Prior to the commencement of the work initiated by us and carried on during the past 20 years, which has led to the production of our New and Improved Breeds of agricultural plants, it was a recognised belief that many farm plants in the production of their seed were more or less cross-fertilised. The results of our experiments however have proved that such was not the case but that constant in-and-in breeding was the rule.

Where such in-and-in breeding takes place the results are governed by the same natural laws as the in-and-in breeding of animals. In the production of New Breeds of animals the rule followed is to mate two animals of distinct breeds. The progeny, when fixity of type has been secured, constitutes a New Breed.

Under our system of plant breeding we carry the mating of varieties or breeds far beyond what is practised in the animal kingdom. In the first instance we mate varieties and also what were formerly regarded as distinct species of the same genera, and after fixation, the progeny by these combinations are further mated together.

A further extension of our system which is in itself unique and instructive, is the mating of uncultivated indigenous plants of the same Natural Order as the cultivated varieties. From such combinations most valuable results have been obtained.

For example in Southern Asia there exists a species of wheat botanically known as Triticum spelta. In some districts it is looked upon as an indigenous weed infesting the cultivated crops of wheat.

Under no climatic conditions does the grain of this species shed its seed when ripe, and even in threshing it is not possible to separate the grains, as the spikelets break off at the bases of the glumes, the grains remaining firmly enclosed between the chaff scales.

By mating the varieties of this species with cultivated varieties, new breeds have been produced which will under no conditions shed their seed when ripe, but which thresh out a perfectly clean sample with a much heavier yield per acre than common wheat.

In China there is an indigenous species of oat botanically known as Avena nuda or naked oat. The peculiar feature of this species is that the grains (which are very small) grow without any husk, being protected only by the chaff. The habit of the plant is likewise quite unique, four or five grains being suspended upon a thread-like filament about half an inch long. The mating of this species with cultivated varieties has produced new breeds giving yields 50 to 100 per cent. heavier than the original cultivated parents, with a corresponding decrease in the thickness of the skin.

The wild or land oat, Avena fatua, of Great Britain has likewise been used with marked success in the production of new breeds in conjunction with the cultivated varieties. In the wild oat there is hardiness of constitution, vigour, strength of straw, and remarkable fertility. All these qualities have been retained in the new breeds produced.

Another part of our system is the improvement of existing varieties of agricultural plants. The method is similar to that adopted by the breeder of stock for the improvement of his animals, when fresh blood of the same breed is introduced from some other herd.

By crossing two distinct plants of the same variety the resulting progeny is more vigorous and robust in constitution, whilst the habit and individual character of the variety is maintained.

A year later, these Explanatory Notes come from the Gartons Seed Catalogue for Spring 1901:

FOR over 20 years the work of cross-fertilising crop plants, with the object of producing New and Improved Breeds, has been carried on at Newton-le-Willows in Lancashire. It has there for the first time been demonstrated to Scientific Botanists as well as to Agriculturists that all the corn crops (cereals) and nearly all the other common crops of the farm are self fertilising. In other words, each individual plant provides the pollen which is required in the process of producing seed, to fertilise the female organs of its own flowers. This natural process results in a perfect system of in-breeding which has been going on for an indefinite period, making it possible to grow the different varieties of crops of the same kind in close proximity to each other, and even as mixed crops without any danger of crosses being produced.

If crossing could have occurred in nature it would have been quite impossible to maintain the purity of any variety of crop plant for more than a year or two. As in the Animal Kingdom, the in-breeding of plants tends to the decrease of constitutional vigour, consequently when cross-fertilisation is practised the size and vigour of the selected progeny are increased in a remarkable degree.

Although the natural laws which govern the Animal and the Vegetable Kingdoms bear a very strong resemblance to each other, further points can be realised and greater progress can be made in a limited time with plants than with animals under a system of cross breeding.

Not only have varieties of a given species, but what were formerly regarded as distinct species belonging to the same genus, been successfully mated. The tendency to sterility in their progeny is overcome by introducing pollen from one or other '01' the original plants, it being the male organs of reproduction that are liable to be absent or defective in the progeny of two extremely divergent parent plants. Many varieties as well as species can thus be blended in the formation of a new breed, but as it is necessary to secure fixity of type in every cross bred plant before it is again used for crossing, the labour and care involved are very considerable.

Attempts at the production of first crosses are not new, as these have been practised for many years by experimenters in the same field, who however stopped short of the point at which the Garton System achieved its greatest results, viz. by compound or multiple crossing. This further stage of the work of cross fertilisation leads to a thorough dislocation of the usual course of the law of inheritance by which "like produces like." In the wilderness of uncertainty and confusion which follows and in which the great majority of the progeny are found to be abortive or inferior, a few choice specimens appear which are grown for a number of years until fixity of type has been secured. These superior and selected specimens are adopted as suitable for cultivation, and a number of them are described in this Catalogue and offered to the public as much superior to the old varieties from which they were derived by the Garton System of Plant Breeding. In making the selections the large quantity and superior quality of the grain, together with great standing power in the straw have been the chief characteristics aimed at, and if these desiderata have been secured in a few of the new breeds to the detriment of the habit of "tillering," the difficulty is readily overcome by providing a liberal seeding.

Some of the most striking and valuable results have been achieved by introducing as progenitors, certain weeds belonging to the same natural order of plants as the cultivated parents. For example, an inferior variety of "spelt" wheat Triticum spelta from Southern Asia, has been employed with excellent results to introduce strength of gluten to the grain, and large yielding and standing power to the crop with immunity from shedding its seed during harvest.

A wild naked Oat, Avena nuda, indigenous to China has been used to produce new breeds which yield in some instances 100 per cent. more than their cultivated parents. Four or five grains are suspended in each spikelet by a thread like filament about half-an-inch long. This peculiar habit of the plant 'has been extended in the progeny and an' accompanying illustration shows a spikelet with no fewer than 14 grains in it.

The hardiness of constitution, standing power of straw, and remarkable fertility of the wild or land oat, Avena fatua, of Great Britain have been successfully introduced, but not without many difficulties, into some of the new breeds.

Some progress has also been made with the improvement of existing varieties of Agricultural plants by introducing pollen from plants of the same variety to increase the vigour of the plant without materially altering its general characteristics.

== Varieties Bred and Introduced ==
Barley Varieties:

Barley varieties bred and introduced to UK agriculture include Standwell in 1898, Invincible (1899), Zero (1900), Brewer's Favourite (1901), The Maltster (1903), Eclipse (1904), Ideal (1906), 1917 (1918), Admiral Beatty (1920), Triumphant (1927).

Oat Varieties:

Oat varieties bred and introduced to UK agriculture include Abundance in 1892, Pioneer (1899), Tartar King (1899), Waverley (1900), Goldfinder (1901), Storm King (1902), Excelsior (1903), Colossal (1904), Rival (1906), Unversed (1907), Bountiful (1908), The Yielder (1909), The Record (1911), The Leader (1913), Supreme (1915), The Hero (1916), The Captain (1919), Sir Douglas Haig (1920), Marvellous (1921), Superb (1923), Earl Haig (1925), Cropwell (1926), Plentiful (1927), Black Prince (1929), Progress (1930), Unique (1931), Onward (1935), Jubilee (1936), Royal Scot (1940), Spitfire (1945), Early Grey (1946), Forward (1953), Angus (1959).

Wheat Varieties:

Wheat varieties bred and introduced to UK agriculture include White Monarch in 1899, White Pearl (1900), Red King (1900), New Era (1903), Reliance (1909), Victor (1910), Benefactor (1914), Early Cone (1918), The Hawk (1918), Marshal Foch (1919), Rector (1923), Benefactress (1925), Renown (1926), Wilhelmina Regenerated (1928), Gartons No 60 (1932), Gartons Q3 (1933), Redman (1934), Little Tich (1935), Wilma (1936), Warden (1938), Meteor (1941), Pilot (1945), Welcome (1950), Masterpiece (1951), Alpha (1952), Victor II (1953), Ritchie (1957), Apex (1965).

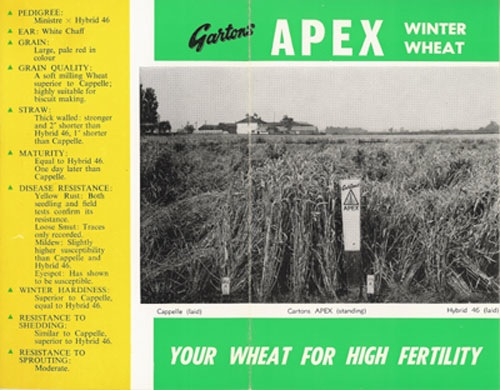

Swede Varieties:

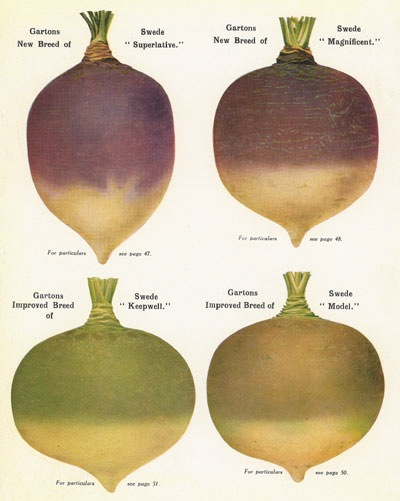

Swede varieties bred and introduced to UK agriculture include Zero in 1900, Lord Derby (1900), Perfection (1900), Monarch (1900), Model (1900), Green Tankard (1901), Keepwell (1902), Cropwell (1903), Superlative (1905), Victory (1907), Incomparable (1907), Warrington (1914), Acme (1914), Magnificent (1917), Viking (1918), Feedwell (1922), White Fleshed (1933), Parkside (1951), Townhead (1951).

Turnip Varieties:

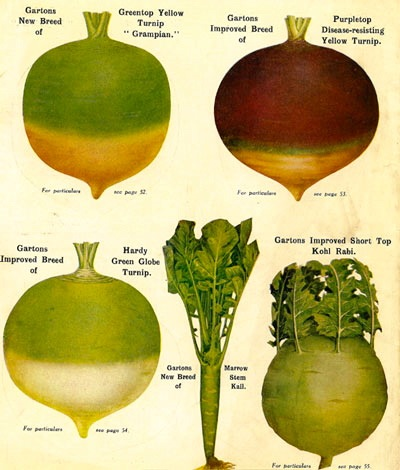

Turnip varieties bred and introduced to UK agriculture include Mammoth Purpletop in 1900, Greentop Scotch Yellow (1900), Hardy Green Globe (1900), Pioneer (1903), Purpletop Long Keeping (1912), Deep Golden Yellow Long Keeping (1912), The Bruce (1917), The Grampian (1920), The Wallace (1935).

Sugar Beet Varieties:

Sugar Beet varieties bred and introduced to UK agriculture include Gartons in 1909, Gartons C (1941) and Gartons Number 632 (1962).

Kale and Kail Varieties:

Kale varieties bred and introduced to UK agriculture include Thousand Headed in 1902, Marrow Stem Kail (1912), Gartons Hybrid (1937) and Hungry Gap (1941).

Kohl Rabi Varieties:

Kohl Rabi varieties bred and introduced to UK agriculture include Large Green in 1902 and Improved Short Top in 1904.

Mangel Varieties:

Mangel varieties bred and introduced to UK agriculture include Large Yellow Intermediate in 1900, Mammoth Long Red (1900), Golden Tankard (1900), Large Yellow Globe (1900), Select Golden Globe (1900), Sugar (1905), Red Intermediate (1905), Devon Yellow Intermediate (1907), Golden Gatepost (1909), Large Red Globe (1910), Large Golden Globe (1910), Nonsuch (1917), Sunrise (1919), White Knight (1922), New Combination (1924), Lemon Globe (1927), Gartons Number 432 (1928), Gartons Number 47 (1931), White Chief (1935), Gartons Number 601 (1960).

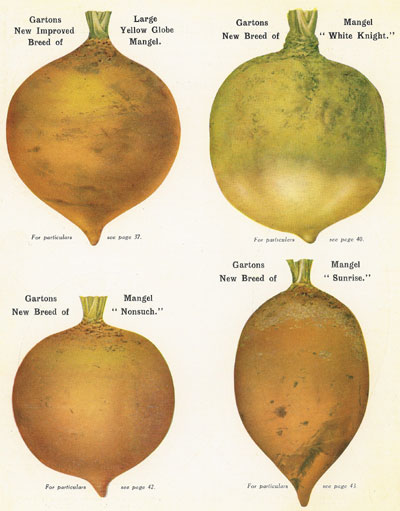

Rape Varieties:

Rape varieties bred and introduced to UK agriculture include Broadleaved in 1906, Early Giant (1947) and Late Dwarf (1947).

Herbage Grass Varieties:

Herbage grass varieties bred and introduced to UK agriculture include Hatchmere Perennial Ryegrass in 1899, Ellesmere Perennialized Italian Ryegrass (1907), Pickmere Perennial Ryegrass (1932), Delamere Cocksfoot (1936), Oakmere Timothy (1940), Flaxmere (1952), Gartons Tall Fescue (1955), Marbury Meadow Fescue (1957), Barmere Timothy (1958).

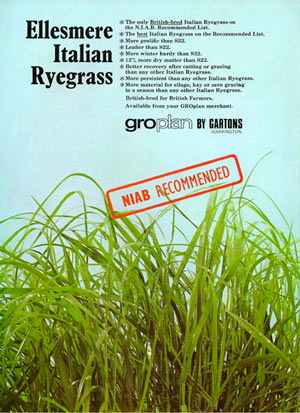

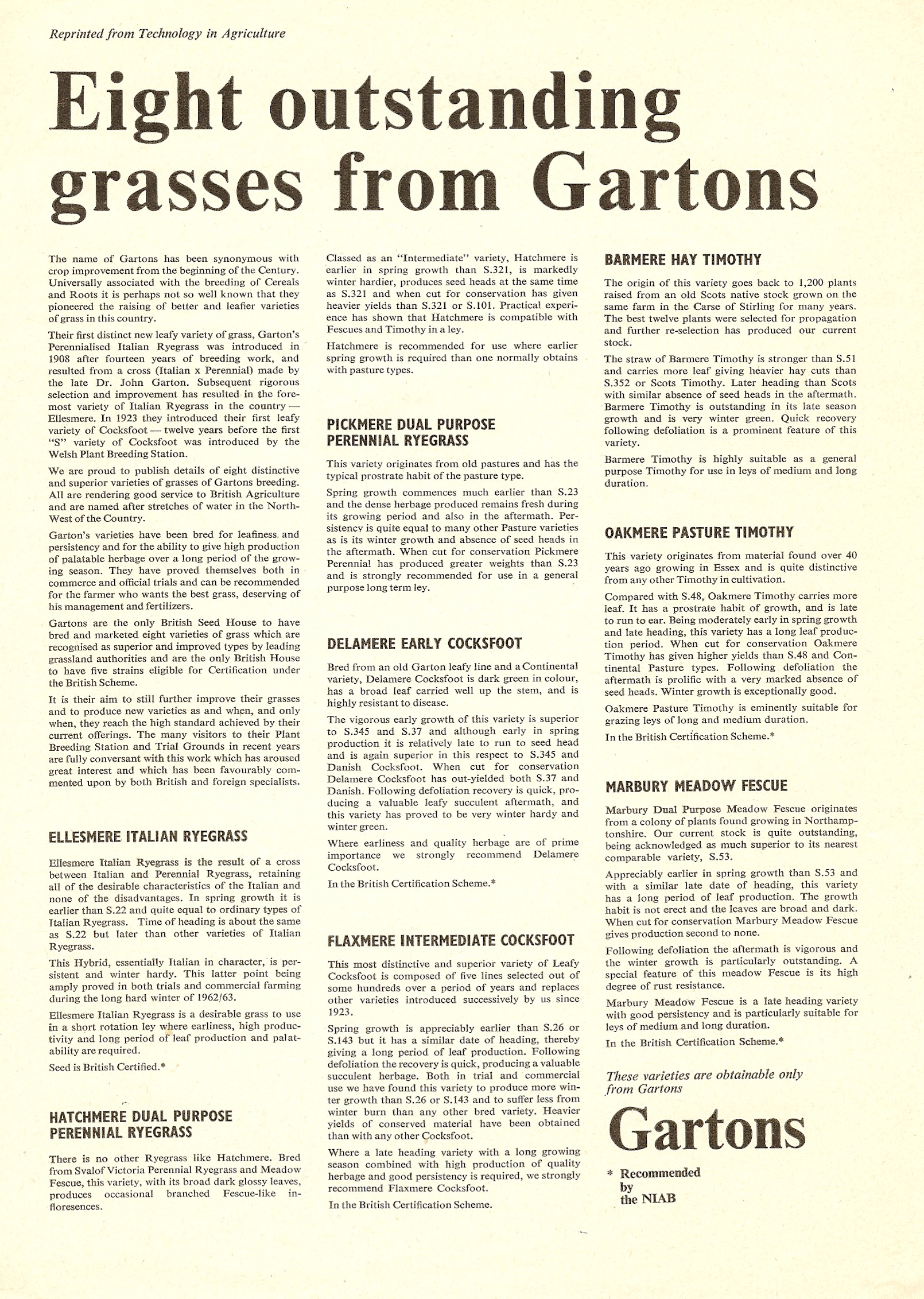

Clover Varieties:

Clover varieties bred and introduced to UK agriculture include Giant Cowgrass in 1898, Perennial Cowgrass (1898), Perennialized Broad Red Clover (1898), Gartons White Clover (1898) and Broad Red Clover (1907).

Field Cabbage Varieties:

Field Cabbage varieties bred and introduced to UK agriculture include Early Ox Heart in 1900, Extra Early Express (1900), Early Drumhead (1900), Selected Drumhead Savoy (1902), Selected Ormskirk Savoy (1902), Gartons Cattle Drumhead (1904), Giant Purple Flat Poll (1917), Utility (1924), Intermediate Drumhead (1924), Gartons Primo (1939).

Field Carrot Varieties:

Field Carrot varieties bred and introduced to UK agriculture include Scarlet Intermediate in 1900, Mid Season Scarlet (1911), Mammoth White (1924), Intermediate Stump Rooted (1935), Red Cored Early Market (1935), Short Stump Rooted (1938), Giant White (1939).

Lupin, Parsnip, Potato, Sprouting Broccoli, Winter Beans and Winter Rye Varieties:

Other crop varieties bred and introduced to UK agriculture include Gartons Lupin in 1922, Gartons Field Parsnips (1902), Gartons Number 12 Potato (1912), Gartons Purple Sprouting Broccoli (1903), Gartons Giant Winter Bean (1922), GS Giant Winter Bean (1950), P/L 14 Giant Winter Bean (1954), Gartons Giant Large Grained Winter Rye (1922).
