= Awareness ribbon =

Symbol intended to show support or bring attention to a cause

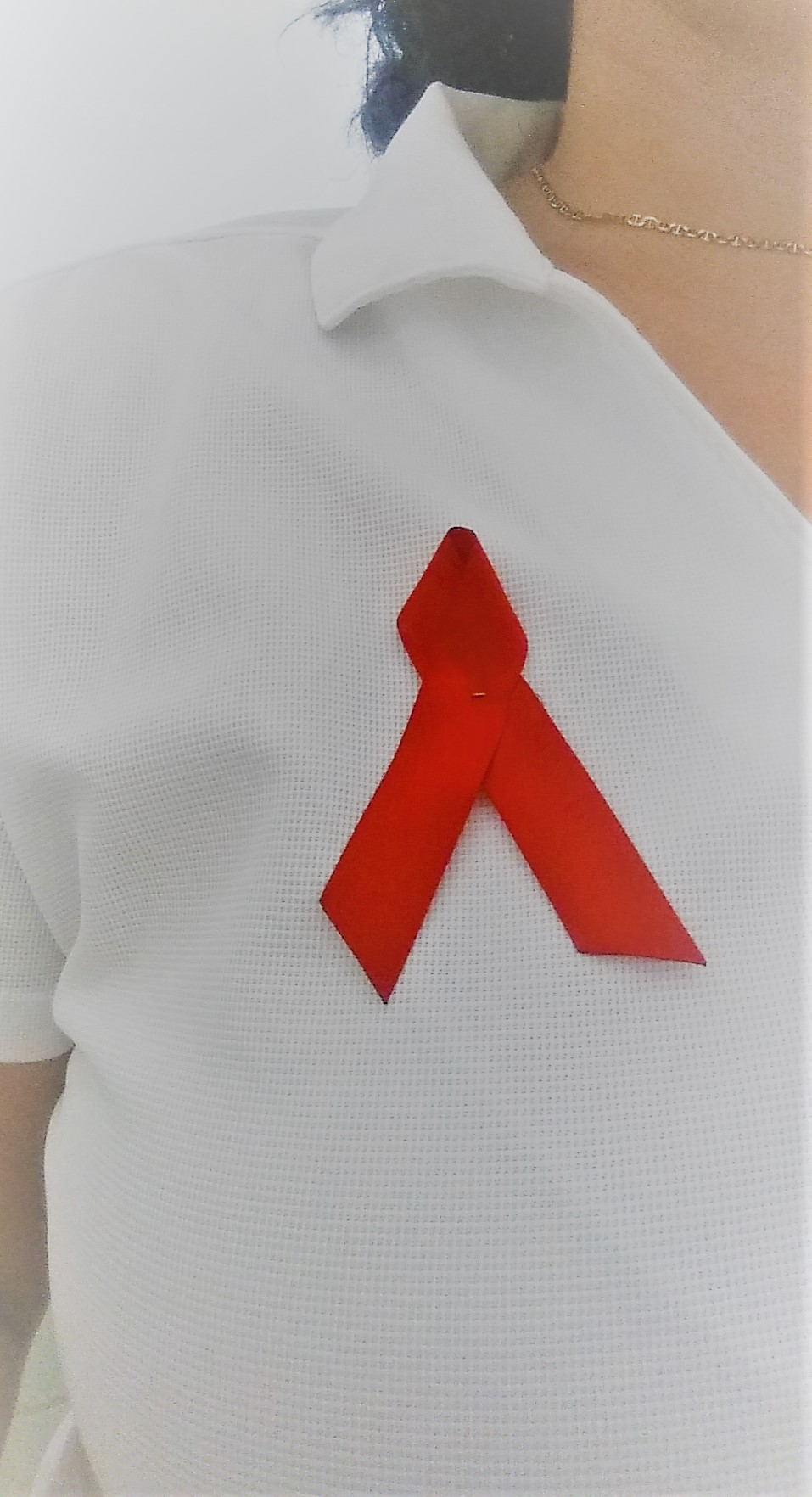
A person wearing a red ribbon to raise awareness and support of victims of AIDS

Awareness ribbons are symbols meant to show support or raise consciousness for a cause. Different colors and patterns are associated with different issues. Awareness ribbons can be worn on clothing like pins, they can appear on bumper stickers in vehicles, or they can be on arm wristbands, among many other ways. The ribbon is a symbol of awareness and support.

Of the uses of ribbons to draw awareness to health issues, perhaps the best-known is the pink ribbon for support of those with breast cancer. Other health and social concerns which have adopted colored ribbons include Alzheimer's disease and pancreatic cancer (purple), HIV/AIDS (red), mental health and mental illness (green), suicide prevention and for brain disorder or disability (silver).

Political use of ribbons include orange ribbons to commemorate the Orange Revolution in Ukraine, blue-yellow ribbons for victims of the Russo-Ukrainian war or general support for Ukraine.

Other ornaments, including flowers (of specific kinds), bracelets, and badges may serve essentially the same purpose of drawing attention to a cause. These include poppies, rosettes and wristbands.

== History ==
The first ribbons that were represented as meaningful objects in history were the tokens given to knights during the Middle Ages in Europe. The yellow ribbon came from the Puritans during the English Civil War. From there, it spread to the Americas, where the Army of the United States became associated with it. A yellow ribbon was mentioned in a marching song of the military in the United States. In 1917, George A. Norton copyrighted the song "Round Her Neck She Wears a Yeller Ribbon". In the 1940s the song was rewritten by several musicians.

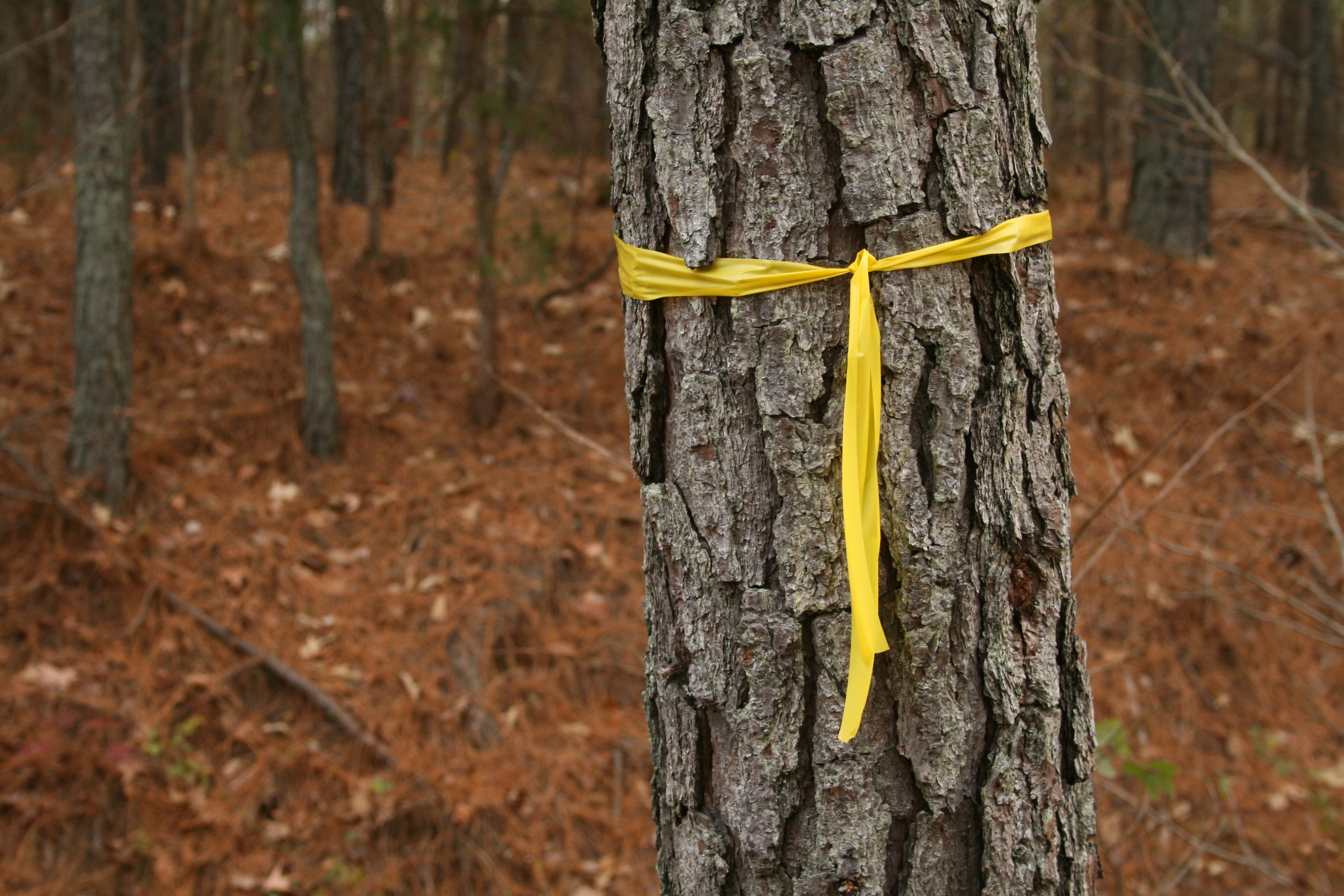
Yellow ribbon marking a tree

In the early 1970s, the song "Tie a Yellow Ribbon Round the Ole Oak Tree" was released. Based on this song, Penney Laingen, wife of Iran hostage Bruce Laingen, was the first who used the ribbon as an awareness symbol. She tied yellow ribbons around trees to express the desire for her husband’s return. Her friends and family members followed the trend. As many individuals were able to see this message, the "ribbon became a medium." During the Gulf War, the symbol evolved into a reminder of all men and women serving the country. Yellow ribbons, in the United States, are used to show that a close family member is abroad in military service.

During the 1979–1981 spate of child murders in Atlanta, green lapel ribbons began to be worn to show solidarity. They were of a different form than later awareness ribbons, being typically bow-shaped.

From 11 to 13 July 1986, the AIDS Faith Alliance, later known as Christian Action on AIDS, held an open conference on AIDS at Essex Unitarian Church in Notting Hill Gate in London, supported by the Archbishop of Canterbury and other United Kingdom Christian church leaders. Rainbow Ribbons were given to everybody attending. The purpose of Christian Action on AIDS, an official Church of England charity whose founder/chairman was Barnaby Miln, was to get the worldwide Christian churches involved in the AIDS crisis.

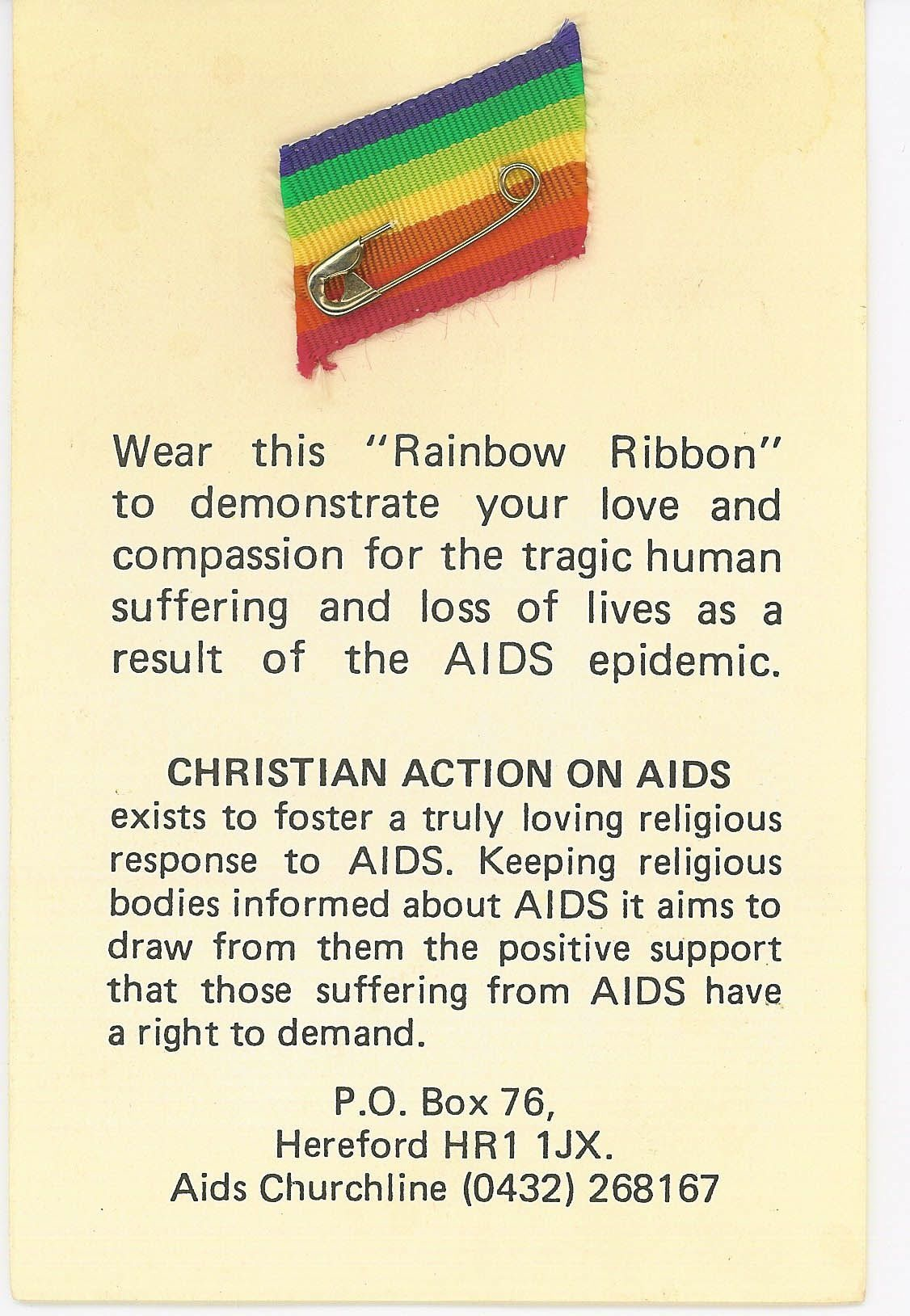
The original AIDS ribbon developed in 1986 by Barnaby Miln and colleagues of Christian Action on AIDS

In 1991, the red ribbon was created by the Visual AIDS Artists Caucus, a New York–based group of artists and AIDS activists. They wished to create a visual symbol to demonstrate compassion for people living with AIDS and their caregivers. The color red was chosen for its "connection to blood and the idea of passion"—both anger and love. During the 1991 Tony Awards, actor Jeremy Irons wore the bright red ribbon pinned on his chest. Though the symbolism of the ribbon was not allowed to be discussed on air, the media and public noticed the eye-catching ribbon, and its popularity grew overnight. The red ribbon was purposefully not copyrighted in the United States, to allow it to be worn and used widely as a symbol in the fight against AIDS. The year 1992 was declared by The New York Times as "The Year of the Ribbon."

The red ribbon is widely recognized internationally as a symbol of HIV/AIDS awareness. Its adoption also contributed to the wider use of colored ribbons to represent various social and health-related causes

In Russia, Belarus and other countries of the former Soviet Union, gold and black striped ribbons are used to celebrate the Allies' victory in World War II (9 May). In Spain a yellow ribbon became a symbol of solidarity with the 2017–18 Spanish constitutional crisis in provisional detention.

The Unicode character standard has a "reminder ribbon" character (🎗️) at code point U+1F397. No color is officially specified for it, and older platforms varied in its presentation; it could appear yellow, blue, or red depending on the device or software in which it is viewed. However on all updated major platforms since 2021 it only appears yellow.

On social media, some users will add visual effects to their user icons as an "awareness avatar", in a similar way to wearing a physical ribbon.

== Purpose and usage ==
Ribbons can be used simply to raise awareness of a disease or signify that an individual has been personally affected by that disease or condition. People often place ribbons around college campuses, throughout neighborhoods, and in public business places so that others can see them and realize they are not alone in their battle. Ribbon colors are often associated with one or more conditions but there are several sources that define what color relates to which condition. They also provide an outline of the dates in which that ribbon is significant. Ribbons are often promoted to signify the prevalence of a specific disease or condition.

There are ribbon colors that also associate with animals and organizations that work with animals. The Animal Legal Defense Fund fights for the rights of all animals alike while displaying an orange ribbon. Animal abuse awareness is also well known for its use of the purple ribbon.

== See also ==
- Awareness activism
- Consciousness raising
- List of awareness ribbons
- Political colour
