= Augustine United Church =

Church in Edinburgh, Scotland

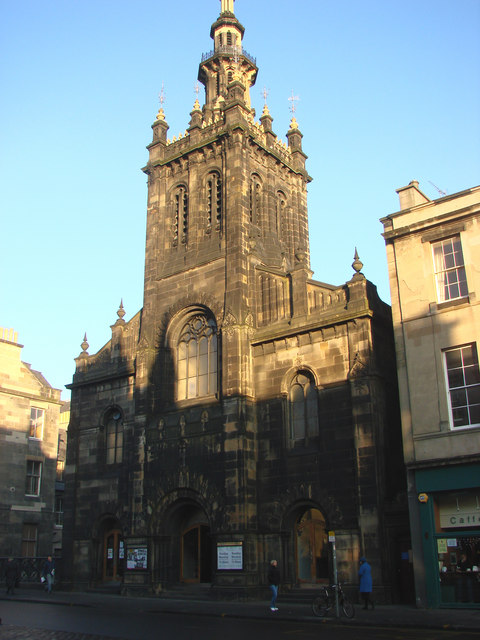
- Augustine United Church
- 55°56′51.3″N 3°11′29″W
- Denomination: United Reformed Church
- Churchmanship: Reformed
- Website: Augustine United Church

Architecture
- Heritage designation: Category B
- Designated: 14 December 1970
- Architect(s): J, JM & WH Hay of Liverpool
- Style: Freestyle
- Groundbreaking: 1857
- Completed: 1861

Listed Building – Category B
- Official name: George IV Bridge and 11A and 11C Merchant Street, Augustine United Free Church (United Reformed Church)
- Designated: 14 December 1970; 55 years ago
- Reference no.: LB26707

Augustine United Church is a United Reformed Church in Edinburgh, Scotland. It is in a local ecumenical partnership with St Columba's-by-the-Castle (Scottish Episcopal Church) and Greyfriars Tolbooth and Highland Kirk (Church of Scotland).

== History ==
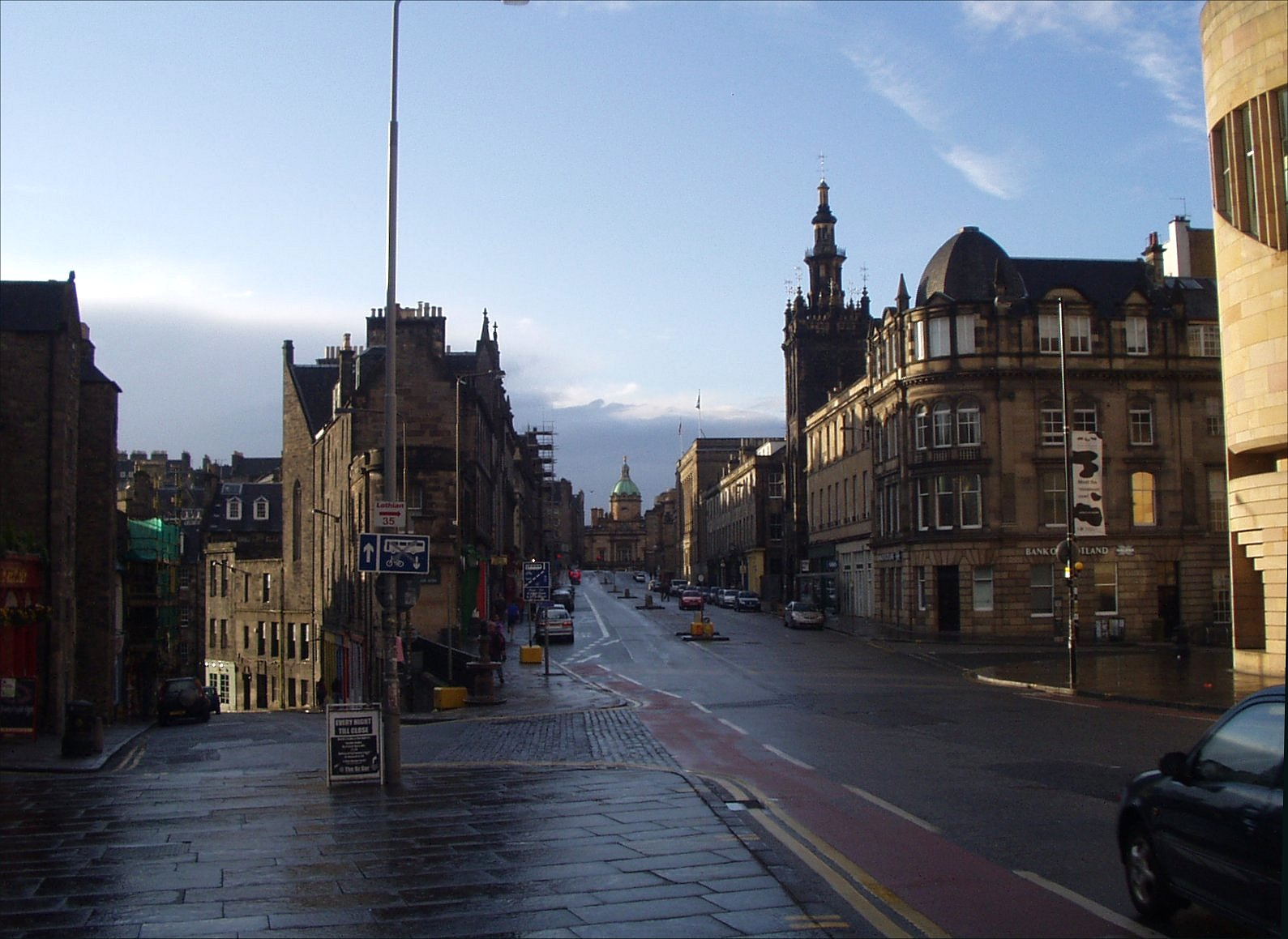
View along George IV Bridge, with Augustine United Church tower on the right

The congregation began in 1802 in the Old Town area of Edinburgh and had a chapel in Chambers Street. The congregation outgrew the chapel, and in 1855 it was demolished to make way for the Industrial Museum of Scotland. The present building at 41 George IV Bridge was started in 1857 and completed in 1861. Its architecture is a freestyle mixture of Romanesque, Renaissance and Classical features topped by a three-tiered tower. It was made a Category B listed building in 1970. The building has recently been renovated and upgraded and is now called the Augustine Church Centre.

== Beliefs ==
=== Marriage ===
The church has an inclusive vision and celebrates both opposite-sex marriages and same-sex marriages.

== The centre today ==
The centre is home to a number of church-related charities and projects, including Christian Aid, Jubilee Scotland and the Edinburgh Community Mental Health Chaplaincy, as well as being the worship centre of Augustine United Church and the Metropolitan Community Church of Edinburgh.

Community, music, political and religious groups hold meetings and events in the centre throughout the week, including the Edinburgh Royal Choral Union and Edinburgh Youth Choir. Each summer, George IV Venues operating as Paradise Green uses the centre as a venue for the Edinburgh Festival Fringe.

On Wednesday 12 February 1997 the National Launch of the first Fairtrade fortnight was held in the church.
