= Eliza Filby =

British historian (born 1981)

- Born: 1981 (age 44–45); Tooting, London, England
- Occupation: Historian
- Spouse: Christian May

Academic background
- Education: Durham University; University College London; University of Warwick

Eliza Filby (born April 1981) is an English historian, author, and speaker specialising in generational change. Her work focuses on how shifting generational values are reshaping society, work, education, politics, and family life.

== Early life and education ==
Filby was born in Tooting, South London. She studied history at Durham University before completing a master's degree in Modern History at University College London. She earned her PhD in Contemporary British History from the University of Warwick in 2010 in a thesis which examined the role that religion played in the politics of the 1980s under the premiership of Margaret Thatcher.

== Career ==
From 2010 to 2014, Filby lectured in Modern British History at King's College London, where her teaching focused on late 20th-century British political and religious history. She held a visiting fellowship at Renmin University in Beijing, delivering lectures on the global history of capitalism.

In 2014, Filby founded GradTrain, a career development company aimed at supporting aspiring academics to translate their work to the media, business and to students.

Since 2015, Filby has worked as a consultant on generational change, advising clients such as PWC, Cisco, Google, and the UK Home Office.

Filby is currently a non-executive director at The Mission Group, a marketing communications and advertising network.

== Research and publications ==
Filby's research explores how generational differences shape social and economic trends, including ageing, family, and work. Her writing has appeared in publications such as The Telegraph, The Guardian, and the New Statesman. Since 2022, she has written a monthly column in the business newspaper City AM.

She is the author of three books:

- God and Mrs Thatcher: The Battle for Britain's Soul (2015), a study of Margaret Thatcher's religious beliefs and their influence on her leadership
- Generation Shift: How Generational Evolution is Changing the Way We Think, Work and Live (2023), analysing the workplace and societal implications of changing generational values
- Inheritocracy: It's Time to Talk About the Bank of Mum and Dad (2024), which became a Sunday Times Top Ten Bestseller and explores the intergenerational transfer of wealth in contemporary Britain

== Media and public engagement ==
Filby is a columnist for The Times as well as the host of It’s All Relative, a YouTube series on money, wealth, privilege and class in modern society. She also writes a weekly newsletter titled "#MajorRelate" which explores societal change through a generational lens. She has appeared as a commentator on Sky News speaking on current affairs, generational identity, and the future of work.

== Personal life ==
Filby lives in Tooting, London. She is married to Christian May, Editor-in-Chief of City A.M., and they have two children.
