= St James, Goldenacre =

- St Philip's and St James, Edinburgh
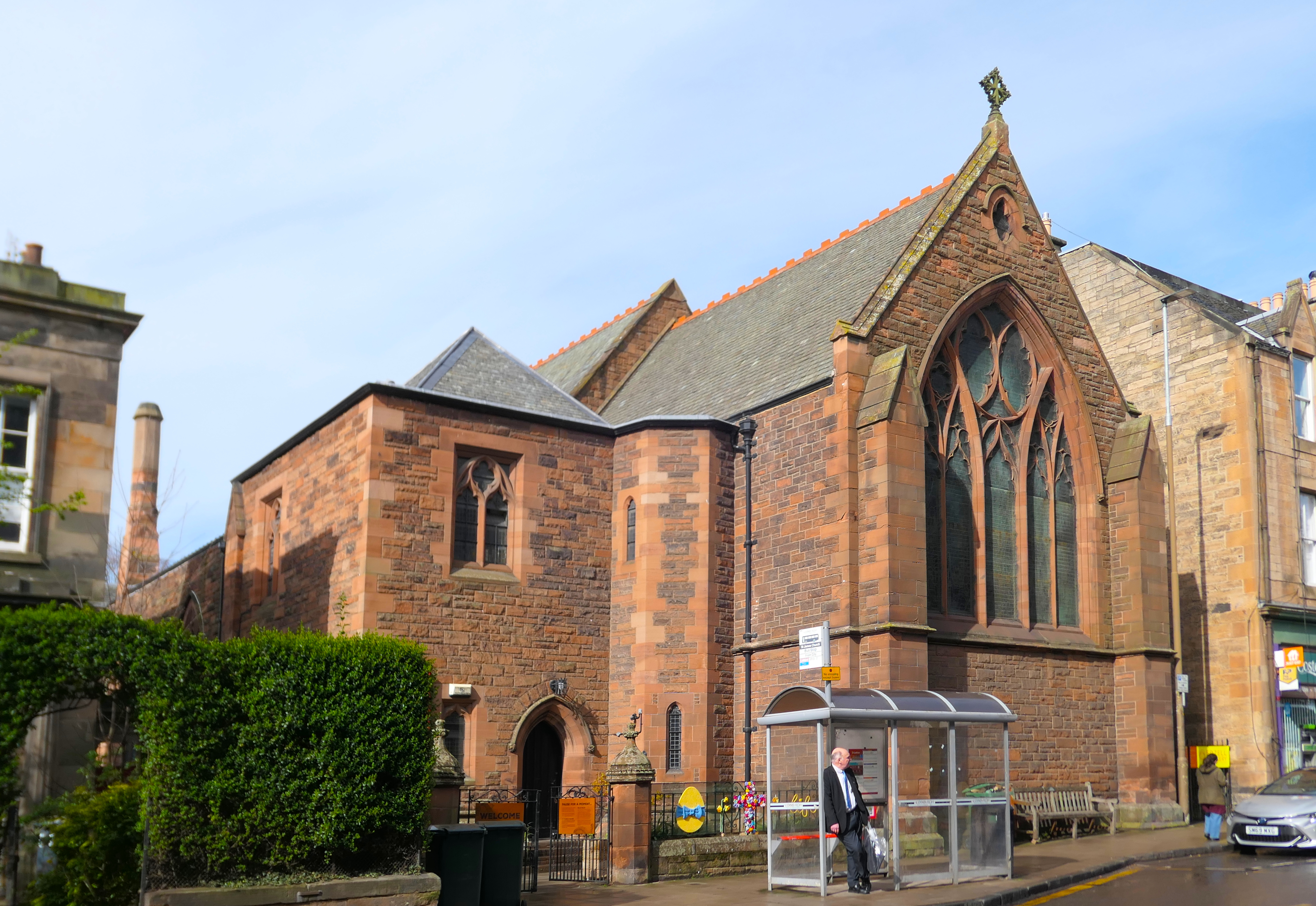
- The east front of the church, viewed from across Inverleith Row
- St James, Goldenacre
- 55°58′14″N 3°12′32″W
- Address: 57b Inverleith Row Edinburgh EH3 5PX
- Country: Scotland
- Denomination: Scottish Episcopal
- Tradition: Anglican
- Website: www.stpj.org.uk

History
- Dedication: James the Less
- Consecrated: May, 1894

Architecture
- Heritage designation: Listed Category B
- Designated: 27 October 1965
- Architect: Robert Rowand Anderson
- Style: Gothic
- Years built: 1886 – 1888

Administration
- Diocese: Diocese of Edinburgh

St James, Goldenacre is a Scottish Episcopal church in the Goldenacre area of Edinburgh. It was designed by Robert Rowand Anderson and opened in 1888. It is a Category B listed building and is noted for its interior decoration, including work by distinguished artists of the 19th and 20th centuries.

== History ==
St James's was originally founded by Rev. Edward Craig, to relieve the overcrowding at St Paul's Church (now Old St Paul's), and initially occupied a building of 1829 in Broughton Place, Edinburgh. In 1883 this building was sold, and the congregation moved to the present site (feued from the Fettes Trust), at first erecting a hall, while conducting a competition for the new church, which was won by Robert Rowand Anderson in 1885. The church was built by John Beattie and Son in red Corsehill stone. In 1888 the church was opened by the Bishop of Edinburgh, but it could not be consecrated until 1894, when it was free of debt. For many years the church was known as "St James's Church, Inverleith Row". The main entrance to the church was originally up an alleyway at the side (still used for access to the church hall) leading via the baptistery to the west end of the nave.

In 1894 the Vestry voted to accept a generous offer from the distinguished artist William Hole (a member of the congregation) to create a complete painted decoration scheme, in his spare time and at no cost.

In 1898 alterations were made to the chancel, in accordance with a scheme designed by Sir John James Burnet, including a gilded triptych above the altar with paintings by William Hole.

In 1922 a rood was erected on a beam across the chancel arch, as a memorial to a former rector. It was designed by Sir John James Burnet and executed by the sculptor Gilbert Bayes. It was later thought that the rood detracted from the view of the chancel, and it was removed and the five sculpted figures installed in the entrance vestibule.

In 1923 a baptistery, also designed by Sir John James Burnet, was added at the west end of the south aisle and now became the way for the congregation to enter the church, through a traceried screen.

In 1985 major structural problems were detected, which led to a programme of remedial work. including the creation of a new entrance through the former organ chamber, giving a better entrance from the street and leading directly to the south aisle.

In 2022 problems were discovered with the nave ceiling, leading to services being held temporarily in the church hall. From 2024 plans are being developed for a major restoration project, with a study day on the church's art and architecture on 1 March 2025.

=== St Philip's ===
In 1895 a mission congregation was established at Canonmills. In 1909 this congregation built a new church, St Philip's, and the joint charge was renamed "St Philip's and St James". St Philip's Church is now rented to another religious body. A "Jesse Tree" carving, by Tom Whalen, was commissioned in 1948 and installed in St Philip's. It is now in St James's church hall.

=== Christ Church ===
Christ Church, in the nearby Trinity district, was built in 1854, initially as a private chapel, by Rev, Walter Mitchell Goalen, son of Arthur Goalen, a ship-builder in North Leith. In 1875 Rev. Goalen sold it to its congregation. In 1897 an organ of 1889 by Thomas Christopher Lewis was installed at Christ Church. In 1971 Christ Church was linked with St James under a single rector, but problems with the fabric meant that it became uneconomic to repair: Christ Church was closed in 1980 (the organ being moved to St Vincent's Chapel, Edinburgh) and is now a private house, "Church House", 118 Trinity Road. Following the closure, a Christ Church chapel was created at St James in a former cloakroom, containing some of the artefacts familiar to members of the Christ Church congregation.

== Description ==
The church occupies a narrow site with the east end facing Inverleith Row: It contains a chancel, a three-bay nave with south aisle, and a short tower. There was provision for extending the nave by two further bays, and for increasing the height of the tower, but this did not happen.

The interior decoration includes a frieze with the words of the Te Deum with vines, peacocks, and apostles, prophets and martyrs, created in spirit fresco by William Hole, who also painted the triptych of Christ with St George and St Stephen above the altar. The chancel decoration, including the altar, choir stalls, and paving, is by John James Burnet, with windows depicting the Good Samaritan by Henry Payne of Amberley, described as "two lights with intricate, graceful drawing."

The baptistery at the west end was designed by John James Burnet. It contains a marble font of white Crestola marble and a carved marble frieze with the words "Suffer the little children to come unto Me for of such is the Kingdom of Heaven". There are a pair of windows by Douglas Strachan representing Jesus blessing the children, and high up between the windows a stone figure of the Good Shepherd by Charles d'Orville Pilkington Jackson.

=== Peace Garden ===
On Sunday 12 November 2023 the Bishop of Edinburgh blessed a Peace Garden in front of the church, incorporating a Peace Pole. The garden symbolises hope and healing, and is intended to be a place for people to sit and rest.

== List of Rectors ==
Name	Date
Edward Craig	1821
J. B. W. Woolnough	
Jacob H. Simmins	1883
Charles J. Jenkins	1892
J. H. Sharp	1917
W. Gerald Elliott	1921
R. M. Pattison Muir	1926
William Gerty	1932
Norman Alexander Theodore Mackie	1952
J. K. Towers	1962
Rodney A. Grant	1971
Kevin F. Scott	1993
Tembu Rongong	2008
Jane MacLaren	2021

== Works cited ==
- Gifford, John; McWilliam, Colin; Walker, David (1991). Edinburgh. The Buildings of Scotland. Penguin Books. ISBN 978-0-300-09672-9.
- Gifford, John; Milner, Andrew; Wilsher, Roy (2008). St Vincent's Chapel Edinburgh. St Vincent's Chapel.
- Cole, Gilbert (1988). A Church in Goldenacre. The Rector and Vestry of St James.
- Hole, Elizabeth (2011). William Hole R.S.A: Miscellaneous Memories of a Lifetime. Mark O'Hanlon. ISBN 978-0-9528059-5-3.
- Burgess, Ross (text); Turner, Paul (photography) (2025). St James, Goldenacre: A Treasure House of the Scottish Arts and Crafts Movement. The Rector and Vestry of St James, Goldenacre. ISBN 978-1-0683832-0-5.
- General Synod (2023). Scottish Episcopal Church Directory 2023/2024. The General Synod of the Scottish Episcopal Church. ISBN 978-0-901741-21-9.
