= St Vincent's Chapel, Edinburgh =

St Vincent's Chapel
- St Vincent's Chapel, Edinburgh
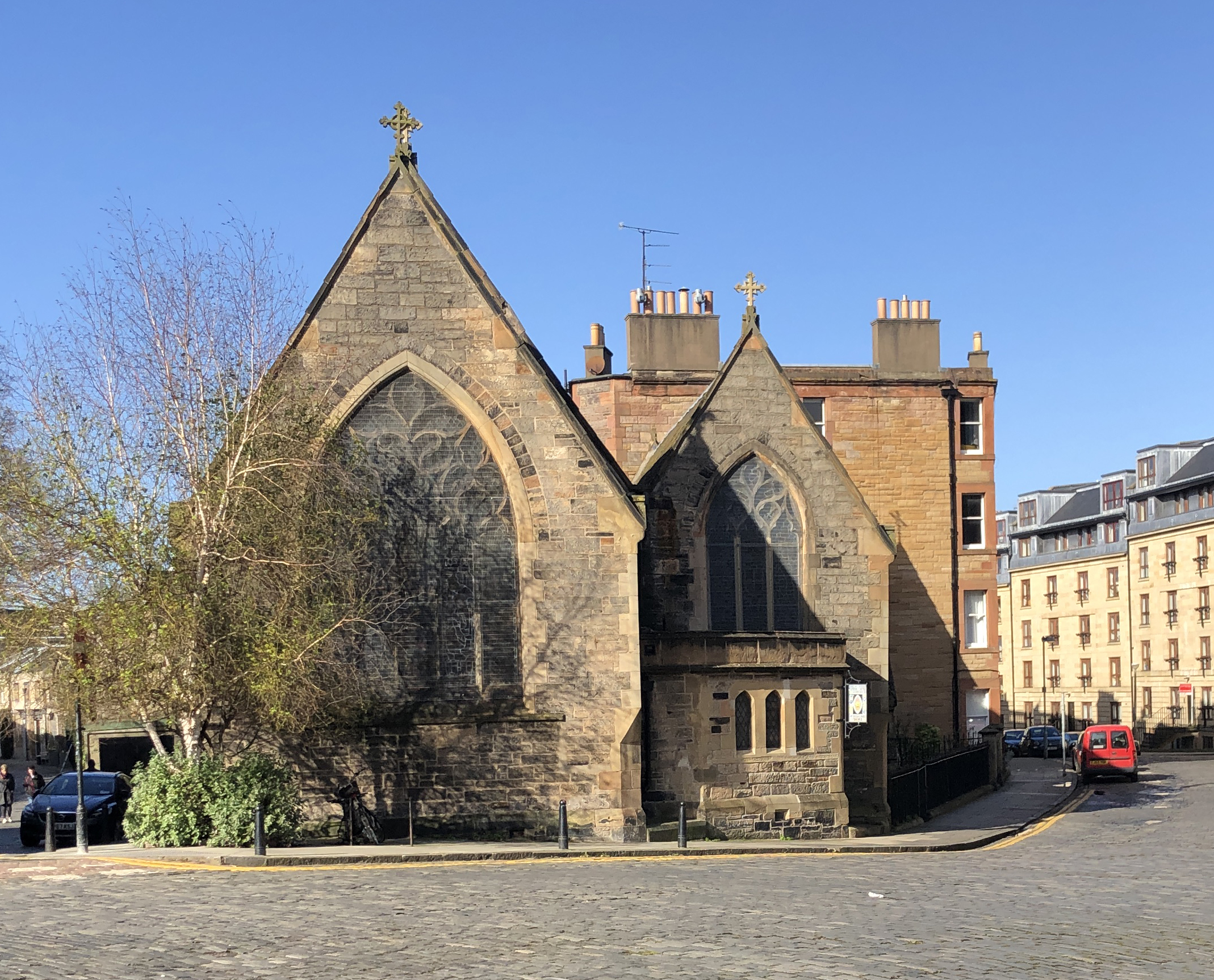
- View of the east end of the chancel, vestry and north aisle taken from St Vincent Street.
- St Vincent's Chapel
- 55°57′30″N 3°12′14″W
- Address: St Vincent Street, Edinburgh EH3 6SW
- Country: Scotland
- Denomination: Scottish Episcopal
- Tradition: Anglican
- Website: www.stvincentschapel.org.uk

History
- Dedication: Vincent of Saragossa

Architecture
- Architect(s): John Hay, William Hardie Hay, James Murdoch Hay
- Style: Gothic

Administration
- Diocese: Diocese of Edinburgh

St Vincent's Chapel is a Scottish Episcopal church in the Stockbridge area of Edinburgh, at the corner of St Vincent Street and St Stephen Street, and just opposite the much larger St Stephen's Church. It was designed by the Hay brothers of Liverpool and opened in 1857. It is a Category B listed building and is noted for the extensive decorative scheme and artefacts relating to the Order of St Lazarus.

== History ==
St Vincent's has a complicated history.

In 1842 an Episcopalian clergyman, Revd David Drummond, a curate at the then Holy Trinity Church, Dean Bridge, seceded from the Episcopal church, which he considered was becoming too Catholic, and founded a new Church of England church, St Thomas, Rutland Place. Around 1852 Drummond appointed an English clergyman, Richard Hibbs, as his curate, but in 1854 Hibbs left St Thomas's and built what is now St Vincent's Chapel, initially describing it as "Christ's English Episcopal Chapel".

In 1875 St Vincent's Chapel was purchased by the lawyer and historian William Forbes Skene – although an Evangelical, he considered that there was no reason to continue as effectively an outlier of the Church of England, and St Vincent's joined the Diocese of Edinburgh in the Scottish Episcopal Church.

In 1971 the Vestry sold St Vincent's to Lieutenant Colonel Robert Gayre for use as the chapel of the Order of St Lazarus although Episcopalian Sunday services continued to be held there. In 1996 Robert Gayre died, and in 2018 his son, Reinold Gayre, generously offered the church and its endowment fund back to the Vestry.The legalities were completed in 2026. In 2014 the chapel re-joined the Diocese of Edinburgh.

== Description ==
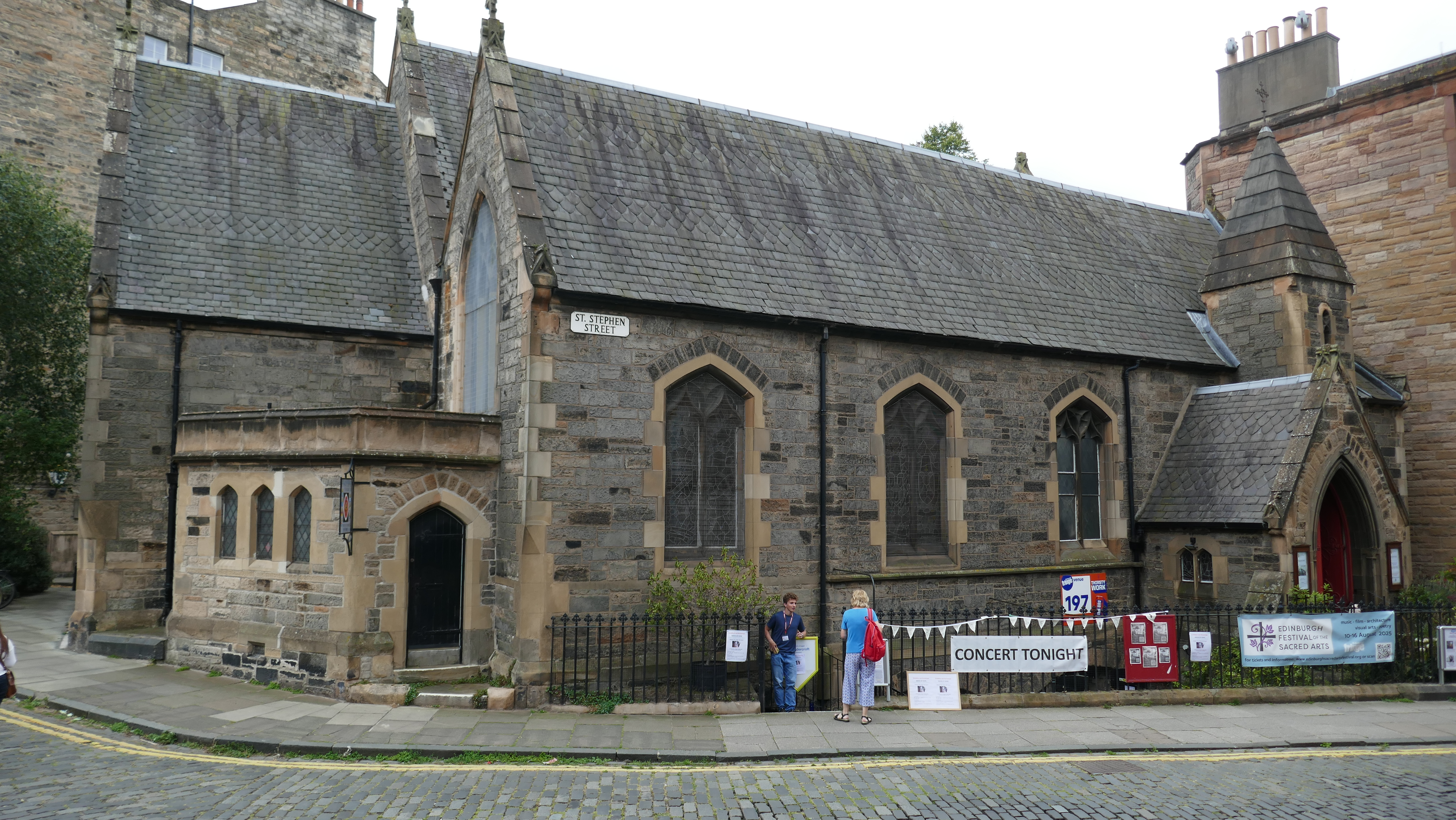
St Vincent's from the north-west

The church comprises a nave and chancel, with a north aisle partly walled off from the nave.

It contains many artefacts featuring the green cross of the Order of St Lazarus, in particular the heraldic windows (described as "admirably bright and clear") by Alexander Carrick Whalen from 1975.

In 1981, the organ of 1889 by Thomas Christopher Lewis was installed in St Vincent's after being removed from Christ Church, Trinity on that church's closure. The current organ, a three manual Makin Westmorland Sapphire, was installed on 21 July 2021, the gift of a member of the congregation.

== Works cited ==
- Gifford, John; Milner, Andrew; Wilsher, Roy (2008). St Vincent's Chapel Edinburgh. St Vincent's Chapel.
- Gifford, John; McWilliam, Colin; Walker, David (1991). Edinburgh. The Buildings of Scotland. Penguin Books. ISBN 978-0-300-09672-9.
- General Synod (2023). Scottish Episcopal Church Directory 2023/2024. The General Synod of the Scottish Episcopal Church. ISBN 978-0-901741-21-9.
