= QX (British magazine) =

British LGBT magazine

QX Magazine
- Editor: Dylan B Jones
- Categories: LGBT, Media, Magazines
- Frequency: Weekly
- Founded: 1992
- Final issue: 2021
- Company: Firststar Ltd
- Country: United Kingdom
- Based in: London
- Language: English
- Website: www.qxmagazine.com
- ISSN: 1356-6903

QX Magazine was a free LGBTQ weekly magazine distributed at most LGBTQ spaces across London and the UK.

The magazine was based in London. As a free magazine, it had a high proportion of advertising space for revenue. Although the magazine included arts reviews, articles on issues affecting the LGBTQ community, its main focus was the club and bar scene of the capital. QX's main feature was its photographic galleries of revellers from the previews weekend. It also featured often explicit adverts for male escorts in its back pages.

Formerly aimed exclusively at gay men, the magazine had more recently shifted its focus to include the whole spectrum of the LGBTQ, with a diverse range of featured cover stars.

Issues of the magazine were available for download in pdf format online or via the magazine's app. The website featured exclusive online content like blogs, playlists and more.

As bars and clubs were closed due to the pandemic of 2020, the magazine stopped publication early in the year and the company owning it went into liquidation in December 2020. As of April 2021, some activity was still evident on the website and social media channel of the publication, but the pdfs of the back issues had been removed from the site.
