= Robin Murray (economist) =

English economist (1940–2017)

- Born: 14 September 1940; 86 years ago Cumbria, England
- Died: 29 May 2017 (aged 76); Hackney, London, England
- Occupation: Economist

Robin Murray (14 September 1940 – 29 May 2017), born Robert Murray, was an industrial and environmental economist. As a social entrepreneur, he advocated and implemented new forms of production and organization, based on principles of ecological sustainability, social justice, and democracy.

Murray was awarded posthumously the Albert Medal of the Royal Society of Arts in October 2017, for "pioneering work in social innovation".

== Early life and education ==
Robin Murray was born on 14 September 1940 in Westmorland (now Cumbria), the son of Stephen Hubert Murray (1908–1994), a barrister, and his wife Margaret Murray Gillett (1907–1979) from a Quaker banking family and an architect. He was the third of four sons. The Murray family moved from Hampstead to Hallbankgate in Cumberland in 1951, Stephen Murray giving up his legal career to farm. Greenside Farm, Hallbankgate, a hill-farm in and around Coalfell, was in a mining area, and a family property of Lady Mary Murray (1865–1956), Stephen's mother and daughter of George Howard, 9th Earl of Carlisle; she passed it on to Stephen and his sister Rosalind Toynbee, wife of Arnold J. Toynbee.

On the move to Cumberland, Murray to went to White House School grammar school in Brampton. In 1952 his parents sent him to Bedales School. It was at Bedales that Robin met his future wife Frances (née Herdman, 1941-) and together they became head boy and girl of the school (1957-8). In 1959 Murray spent several months in between leaving school and going up to university working for Danilo Dolci in Partinico, Sicily.

Murray studied Modern History at Balliol College, Oxford, (1959–1962), then at the College of Europe in Bruges where he received a Diploma in European Studies (1962–1963), finally at the London School of Economics where he earned his MSc in economics (1963–1966). While studying at the LSE, Murray was an Adult Education Lecturer for the Oxford University Extra Mural Department, the Inner London Education Authority and the Workers' Educational Association.

== Career ==
=== 1960s ===
On finishing his studies, Murray became a lecturer in economics at the London Business School between 1966 and 1970. He was part of the group that helped bring the May Day Manifesto into being, and then contributed with Michael Barrett Brown to the economics section of the 1968 Penguin edition which was edited by Raymond Williams. The original 1967 edition was edited by Stuart Hall, Edward Thompson and Raymond Williams. Thereafter he joined the Institute of Development Studies at the University of Sussex (IDS) as a Fellow in Economics where he stayed until 1993.

=== 1970s ===
During the 1970s Murray played a critical role in the Brighton Labour Process Group which provided a series of papers for the inaugural Conference of Socialist Economists (CSE) in the 1970s. He was also involved in the CSE's evolution, namely the Bulletin of the CSE and later the peer-reviewed academic journal Capital and Class in which he contributed two articles in its first two years, and several articles thereafter. The journal continues to be published. During this period, Murray was involved in setting up and leading the Marxist Capital Reading Group in Brighton and was active in the Brighton local community organization QueenSpark. For two decades at the IDS, Murray's academic work focused on industrial strategy, trade policy, Marxist theory, flexible specialization, and international corporate taxation. As a teacher, he was noted for his use of the Socratic method and metaphor.

=== 1980s ===
Between 1982 and 1986, Robin Murray worked as the director of industry and employment at the Greater London Council and was tasked with developing the London Labour Plan and the London Industrial Strategy. The latter set out an action plan to regenerate London's economy in a socially sustainable way, creating a blueprint for the Labour Party's future national economic policies.

In the months leading up to the abolition of the GLC, Murray and his colleagues created the Third World Information Network (Twin) which initially imported goods from the Global South in solidarity with the co-operative movement. Following on from this, Robin Murray and colleagues went on to set up Twin Trading, an innovative and groundbreaking organization which combined trade with social and economic development in partnership with coffee co-operatives in Mexico, Peru, Nicaragua and East Africa. In so doing, Twin and Twin Trading were at the forefront of the Fair Trade movement, one of the great social innovations developed in response to the post-imperial contradictions of political self-determination shackled by economic dependency.

Reflecting on his experience at the GLC, Robin Murray wrote a number of highly influential articles in Marxism Today on the emergent subject of ‘post-Fordism’. These articles played a critical role in introducing the concept of ‘post-Fordism’ to the wider left in the UK. His view was that contemporary forms of production could further the classical democratic socialist objectives of co-operation, democratic self-management, and self-realization. Drawing on his experience at the GLC, Murray learned the inadequacy of traditional industrial policy to those sectors which were rooted in particular cultural and/or geographical communities (reproduction furniture, clothing, branches of food production, and a range of cultural industries). What they often lacked – economically – was the collective institutions developed most notably in the so-called Third Italy (such as consortia, specialist colleges, centers of ‘real’ services’) which allowed small firms to have access to those services normally only available to large firms; quality control and branding, information on design, markets, and technology, skilled labor and political representation in the capital.

Much of Murray's work in the 1980s and 1990s was about strengthening these types of economy, particularly linked to the economic development of particular places and communities. This was done partly through advice to governments (local, provincial, and national) and through the work of Twin Trading, the alternative trading intermediary set up to strengthen small farmers from marginal regions in Latin America and Africa in first world markets.

=== 1990s ===
During this time, Robin Murray became Programme Adviser to the SEEDS Association of Local Authorities (1986–1993). He subsequently became visiting professor at Carleton University in Ottawa and a special adviser to the minister of economic development and trade in the Government of Ontario (1993–1995). In Ontario, where he was responsible for Community Economic Development policy for the Provincial Government, his focus was on three sectors: food, culture and green industries. The cultural industries work was directed towards (a) providing support to ethnic communities and areas with high unemployment in establishing and expanding their own cultural industries (through new distribution facilities, training programmes, cultural industry finance, and cultural spaces – including in one case a crematorium) and (b) allowing existing cultural institutions to re-conceptualize themselves within a wider cultural economy – museums, libraries, art galleries, cinemas and theatres.

Upon his return to the UK in the mid-1990s, Murray became the chair of Twin and Twin Trading, the Fair Trade organizations responsible for developing the fair trade brands Cafedirect, Divine Chocolate, Agrofair UK and Liberation Foods. He held this position until 2007. Between 2005 and 2009 Murray was the chair of Liberation Foods (formerly The Ethical Nut Company).

=== 2000s ===
In the late 1990s and early 2000s, Murray's work focused on industrial restructuring in response to environmental pressures (notably waste and energy). It is during this period that Murray wrote Creating Wealth from Waste and Zero Waste. During this period, he was director of the London Pride Waste Action Programme (1996–1997), executive director of the London Recycling Consortium (1997–2004) and chair of the Tower Hamlets Community Recycling Consortium (2003–2007). Between 1998 and 2002 Murray also helped to devise local waste policies in Essex, Newcastle upon Tyne, Lancashire and Greater Manchester. Between 2003 and 2008, he played a key role as Environmental Adviser to London's deputy mayor, Nicky Gavron in developing London's recycling policy and setting up the London Climate Change Agency. Between 2001 and 2002 he was a member of the Planning Advisory Group to the Greater London Authority, advising on spatial planning in London. The following year Murray was a member of the Waste Advisory Group for the Cabinet Office of the UK Government, advising on waste policy. In 2003, he was a special adviser to the Parliamentary Select Committee on Waste. Between 2005 and 2007, Robin led the development of the Green Homes Concierge Service for London.

Between 2004 and 2005 Murray was the acting director of RED, the research and innovation arm of the Design Council. He oversaw projects in Kent and Bolton on co-creating health services. These and other projects developed and refined Murray's thoughts on the critical role of design in public service reform and social innovation. Murray was able to continue his work in this area as a visiting fellow at Nesta (2008–2010) and The Young Foundation (2008 – onwards) where he led a major research project examining the ways to design, develop and grow social innovation. As part of this project, Murray co-authored The Open Book of Social Innovation and Social Venturing and wrote Danger and Opportunity.

=== 2010s ===
After this, Murray undertook a strategic review of the future of co-operation in the UK for Co-operatives UK (2010–2011). He continued his work on the social economy as a visiting research fellow at the Centre for the Study of Global Governance and then a senior visiting fellow at the Civil Society and Human Security Research Unit at the LSE (2011–2017). He also taught at Schumacher College.

== Interests ==
Murray's interests as economist included: Marxian theory; transfer pricing, globalisation and transnational corporations; industrial policy and cooperatives; fair trade, local economic development, international development, the environment, waste and recycling, social innovation and the social economy and the circular economy.

=== Marxism ===
In Internationalization of Capital and the Nation State (1971) Murray argued that the internationalization of capital weakened the political power of the nation state. His theses in this article were criticized at the time by Bill Warren, who found in particular Murray's discussion of "territorial non-coincidence" unconvincing. With Murray advocating the view that ultra-imperialism was displacing national capitalisms, and Warren instead claiming that imperialism was being replaced by those capitalisms, Robert Rowthorn took an intermediate view, predicting a future of nationalist rivalries.

In two papers from 1977 on Value and Theory of Rent, Murray worked with the assumption that Karl Marx's theory of differential and absolute ground rent applies generally to landed property, of whatever kind. His phrase "founder's rent" has been called "muddled".

=== Transfer pricing ===
In his editor's introduction to Multinationals Beyond the Market (1981), Murray wrote of the international trade theory of neoclassical economics as faced with challenges on two sides: from the theories around unequal exchange, and also, the focus of the book, from institutional critique. His paper in the volume stated that the arm's length principle for transfer pricing had become problematic for international trade, referring to customs literature for issues on how to carry out the accounting. He mentioned two other public policy approaches: anti-monopoly legislation, and bilateral bargaining to correct the asymmetry present in trading relationships, with state intervention. He had already argued in a 1970 conference paper for a descriptive framework of the bargaining process between international companies and nation states, given that these negotiations often were asymmetric. Murray's widely used teaching case study on bargaining over access to North Sea oil deposits showed how the choice of the discount rate affected the distribution of rents between the state and the private sector. Building on this case-study and drawing on the work of Constantine Vaitsos on the pharmaceutical industry, Murray convened an influential conference on transfer pricing at the Institute of Development Studies in Sussex in 1975. This made an important contribution to foregrounding the control of transfer pricing in development policy, particularly in the operational work of the United National Conference on Trade and Development (UNCTAD).

=== Fair trade ===
Co-founder in 1985 with Michael Barratt Brown of Twin Trading, a fair trade company, Murray played a part in the creation of the brands Cafédirect and Divine Chocolate. Barratt Brown, a personal friend, had retired from Northern College for Residential and Community Adult Education in 1983 and come to work with Murray at the GLC. There he contributed to the London Industrial Strategy. The British government Department for International Development commissioned a report Understanding and Expanding Fair Trade from Barratt Brown, Murray and Pauline Tiffen.

Twin Trading moved after the International Coffee Agreement broke down in 1989, to market a popular coffee. To that end it went into partnership with Equal Exchange, Oxfam and Traidcraft to set up the Cafédirect brand.

=== Fordism and Post-Fordism ===
Murray has been credited with the introduction to British debate of "Post-Fordism". While the concept is credited to the regulation school of French economists, he drew primarily on the ideas of Michael J. Piore and Charles Sabel, who saw a "Second Industrial Divide" as flexible specialization began to replace mass production; as well as on the work of Michael Best on Japan and the industrial districts in Northern Italy. Writing in the 1980s, Murray viewed both the Thatcherite imposition of rational choice models onto the British public sector and the Soviet system as outdated expressions of Fordism. Building upon his practical experience at the GLC, he observed that dynamic and innovative businesses had moved on: car factories in Japan, industrial districts of Italy and Silicon Valley were all adopting more nimble and flexible strategies, focusing on skills, innovation and participation.

=== The social economy ===
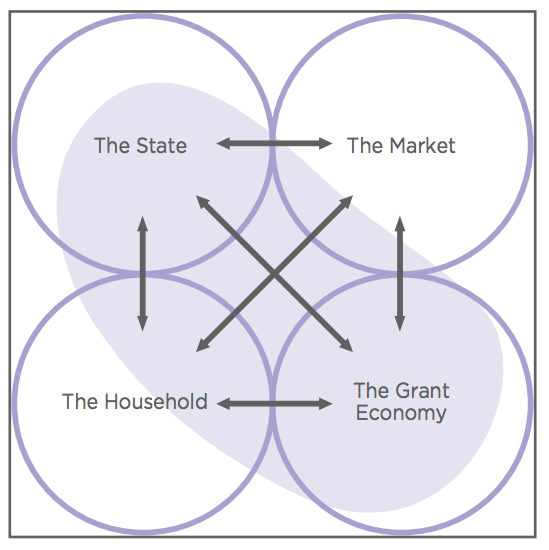
The social economy

The term that Murray preferred was the social economy; not a separate third sector, but the provision of services driven by the imperative of social values rather than financial accumulation. His social economy of active users, or "prosumers". He developed this vision through existing case studies, drawing on his work with cooperatives and environmental advocacy groups, healthcare coalitions and social entrepreneurs.

== Bibliography ==
=== 1960s ===
- Robin Murray (ed.), Vietnam: No 1. in the Read-in series, Eyre & Spottiswoode, London, 1965
- Robin Murray, Vietnam, in Views, no. 9, 1965
- Robin Murray, "The Aluminium Industry in Guinea", (mimeo) 29 pp 1967
- Robin Murray, Economics and the London Business School, 1967
- Contributor to New Left, May Day Manifesto 1967
- Robin Murray, "International oligopoly in the Metal Container Industry", Case study. mimeo. 15 pp. 1969
- Robin Murray, North Sea Gas: a case study, together with teaching note (mimeo) 14 pp and 29 pp. 1969
- Robin Murray, "Eurodollars: a survey" 57 pp. (mimeo), 1969

=== 1970s ===
- Robin Murray, "The Political Economy of Communications" joint paper with Tom Wengraf and Stephen Hymer, Spokesman no.5 1970 pp 8–14
- Robin and Frances Murray, ‘An examination of the existing constabularies and inspectorates concerning themselves with the sea and the sea bed’ in Quiet Enjoyment: Arms control and police forces for the ocean, Proceedings of the Preparatory Conference on Arms Control and Disarmament, January 1970.
- Robin Murray, Multinational Companies and Nation States: Two Essays, Spokesman Books, 1975. The two essays were originally published in The Spokesman Journal, Numbers 10 and 11 in 1971 as “The Internationalisation of Capital and the British Economy”, and “The Internationalisation of Capital and the Nation State”.
- Robin Murray, Anatomy of Bankruptcy, Spokesman Books, 1971
- Robin Murray, "Kanpur: a case study in the transfer of technology", (mimeo) 14 pp. 1972
- Robin Murray, "Bankruptcy at Upper Clyde Shipbuilders", The Spokesman 20 Dec 1971-Jan 1972 pp 9 – 22.
- Robin Murray, Underdevelopment, international firms, and the international division of labour, inTowards a New World Economy, Rotterdam University Press, 1972
- Robin Murray, Technology Transfer: a case study of Ethiopia, UNCTAD 1974
- Robin Murray, Major Issues arising from the transfer of technology. A case study of Ethiopia. Report by the UNCTAD secretariat. Geneva, United Nations, 1974
- HVA and the Nationalisation of the sugar industry in Ethiopia, Robin Murray, IDS, May 1976
- A Case Study of Creeds" Brighton CSE Labour Process Group 1976, CSE Annual Conference 1976 pp 1 – 34
- The Production Process of capital and the capitalist labour process by the Brighton Labour Process Group, Robin Murray, Hugo Radice et al., 1976
- The State and the Labour Process: notes, minutes and paper, 1976
- Robin Murray, Rent and the Development of Landed Property, IDS, 1976
- Robin Murray, A Code for Compensation of Nationalised Assets, Government of Ethiopia, 1976
- Robin Murray, "Value and the Theory of Rent part 1" in Capital and Vol. 1, No. 3. Autumn. 1977 pp 101-121
- Robin Murray, Transfer pricing and the State, Conference on Transfer Pricing, IDS, 6–10 March 1978
- Robin Murray, "The Chandarias: a case study of a Kenyan Multi-national" in ed. R Kaplinsky, Multinational Firms in Kenya, OUP 1978
- Robin Murray, "Value and the Theory of Rent part 2" in Capital and Class Vol. 2/ No. 1. Spring. 1978 pp 9-33
- Robin Murray and Andrew Goodman, Video and Development studies: IDS and the use and production of audio visual materials for development studies, May 1978
- Collectivism, statism and the associated mode of production: Notes towards the critique of the political economy of socialism as it actually exists. Brighton Labour Process Group, July 1979

=== 1980s ===
- Olivier le Brun and Robin Murray, The Seychelles National Youth Service: The seed of a new society, 1980
- Olivier le Brun and Robin Murray, The Seychelles National Youth Service Part 2 - From Seed to the Flower, 1981
- Robin Murray, From Colony to Contract: HVA and the Retreat from Land, IDS, 1981
- Robin Murray, "Transfer pricing and the State: a Manual, UNCTC, 1981
- Robin Murray (ed) Multinationals beyond the Market: intra-firm trade and the control of transfer pricing, Harvester Press, 1981
- Robin Murray (ed) Multinationals beyond the Market, Harvester Press, 1981
- Olivier le Brun and Robin Murray, One Year Later: Seychelles National Youth Service project, 1982
- Robin Murray, Christine White and Gordon White (eds), Revolutionary Socialist Development in the Third World, Harvester Press, 1983
- Robin Murray et al., Brighton on the Rocks: Monetarism and the Local State, Brighton, QueenSpark Books, 1983
- Robin Murray, New Directions in Municipal Socialism in (ed.) B Pimlott, Fabian Essays in Socialist Thought, Heineman 1984
- Bridges not Fences. Report of Third World Trade and Technology Conference, GLC/TWIN, 1985
- Robin Murray, London and the Greater London Council: restructuring the Capital of Capital, In Slowdown or crisis? Restructuring in the 1980s, IDS Bulletin 1985, Vol.16, no 1, IDS
- D Stevenson and R Murray, The Future of Planning: London's Proposals, 1985
- Benetton Britain: The new economic order, Marxism Today, Nov 1985, 28-32
- Robin Murray, "What are the lessons from London?" in: K. Coates (ed.) Joint Action for Jobs, Spokesman Press, 1985
- Robin Murray, Flexible specialisation and development strategy’ in (eds.) Huib Ernste and Verena Meier, Regional Development and Contemporary Industrial Response, 1986
- Robin Murray, Public sector possibilities, Marxism Today, July 1986, 28-32
- Robin Murray, ‘Ownership, Control and the Market’, New Left Review, no.164, 1987
- Robin Murray, Social ownership for the 1990s: a local view of a national vision, Local Work 3 January 1987
- Robin Murray, Cyprus Industrial Strategy, Report of the UNDP/UNIDO Mission. Main Report, Institute of Development Studies, 1987]
- Robin Murray, South-South Divide, SEEDS, 1987
- Robin Murray, "Pension Funds and Local Authority Investment" in ed. L Harris, New perspectives on the Financial System, Croom Helm, 1987
- Robin Murray, Breaking with bureaucracy: Ownership, Control and Nationalisation, Centre for Local Economic Strategies, 1987
- Robin Murray, Cyprus Industrial Strategy. Report on the fourth stage. IDS, June 1988
- Robin Murray, Crowding Out: Boom and Crisis in the South East, SEEDS, Delivered to SEEDS Association, National Union of Railwaymen, London, 28 November 1988
- Robin Murray, the Production of Industrial Strategy, IDS, 7–8 July 1988
- Life after Henry (Ford), Marxism Today, Oct 1988, 8-13
- Robin Murray, "Right Lines: a study of British Rail Services in the South East", 1988
- Robin Murray and Kurt Hoffman, Flexible specialisation: the potential for Jamaica. Report of an exploratory mission. IDS, 1989
- Robin Murray, Fordism and Post-Fordism in Stuart Hall and M Jacques (eds.) New Times: The Changing Face of Politics in the 1990s, Verso 1989.

=== 1990s ===
- Robin Murray, Flexible Specialisation in small island economies: the case of Cyprus, Paper prepared for the International Conference on Industrial Districts and Local Economic Regeneration, ILO, Geneva, 18/19 October 1990
- Robin Murray, Regional Economic Policy in Europe in the 1990s in the light of the experience of the 1980s, Report prepared on behalf of Agenor for the European Commission, May 1990
- Robin Murray, ‘Multinationals and social control in the 1990s’, European Labour Forum, no. 2, Autumn 1990. Pg. 31-35
- Avril Joffe, Robin Murray and Sandar Sips, Fordism and Socialist Development, IDS, 1990
- Robin Murray, Small scale enterprise in the economic thought of the British Left. Paper for the Bologna meeting on small firms and socialist economic thought, October 15 and 16, 1990.
- Robin Murray, The Last Resort: a study of tourism and post tourism in the South East of England, (editor and contributor), 1990
- Robin Murray, Flexible Specialisation in Jamaica, Future Perspectives, IDS February 1991
- Robin Murray, The State after Henry, Marxism Today, pp 22-27, May 1991
- Robin Murray, Local Space: Europe and the New Regionalism: economic practice and policies for the 1990s, 1991
- Robin Murray, International developments in the food industry, Prepared as part of the Jamaican Food Industry Strategy for the United Nations Industrial Development Organisations on behalf of Jampro and the Government of Jamaica. IDS, 1992
- Robin Murray, Flexible Specialisation and Agro-Industry in Honduras, Prepared for the United Nations Industrial Development Organisation and the United Nations Development Programme on behalf of the Government of Honduras. IDS, 1992
- Robin Murray, La piccola impresa nel pensiero economico della sinistra Britannica, in Il Ponte, Rivista di politica economica e cultura fondata da Piero Calamandrei, Agosto-Settembre 1992, Vallecchi Editore, Firenze, 1992
- Robin Murray, Europe and the New Regionalism", in M. Dunford and G. Kafkalas (eds.) Cities and Regions in the New Europe: the global-local interplay and spatial development strategies. Belhaven Press, 1992
- Robin Murray, Flexible specialisation and development strategy: the relevance for Eastern Europe in H. Ernste and V. Meier (eds.) Regional development and contemporary industrial response, Belhaven Press, 1992
- Robin Murray, The theory and practise of local economic development, A Guide, Planact, Johannesburg, 1992
- Robin Murray, From Bologna to Basildon: local economic development, Planact, Johannesburg, 1992
- Robin Murray, Towards a Flexible State, IDS Bulletin vol. 23, no. 4, 1992
- Robin Murray, New Forms of Public Administration, Introduction, IDS Bulletin, vol. 23, no.4, 1992
- Geoff Mulgan and Robin Murray, Reconnecting Taxation, Demos, 1993
- Robin Murray, Small and medium firms in a Russian agricultural district: the case of Shakhovskoy, 1993
- Robin Murray, Roderick Snell, Victor Steinberg and David Youlton, A strategy for the TV and Video Equipment Industry in the former Soviet Union". A Report prepared for the European Bank for Reconstruction and Development, IDS, April 1993.
- Robin Murray, "Transforming the State" in G Albo, D Langille and L Panitch (eds.) A different kind of state. Toronto, Oxford University Press 1993
- Robin Murray, Administration and industrial development in Eritrea. A report to the Ministry of Trade, Industry and Tourism, November 1993
- Robin Murray, Community Economic Development: a review, Government of Ontario, 1995
- Robin Murray, "Centres for Real Services: the case of textiles in Emilia Romagna" in ed. Rush, Technology Institutes: Strategies for Best Practice, Routledge 1996
- Robin Murray and Adrian Atkinson, "Environment and Development" in Ines Newman and Mike Geddes (eds) Re-making the regional economy: celebrating achievement. Shaping new policies for the south east, SEEDS, 1997
- Restructuring the State: the case of economic administration in Cyprus, May 1998
- Robin Murray, Life after Henry (Ford), Marxism Today, October 1998
- Robin Murray, Re-inventing Waste: Towards a London Waste Strategy, Ecologika, 1998
- Robin Murray, Creating Wealth from Waste, London, Demos, 1999
- Robin Murray, Understanding and expanding fair trade, DFID, 1999

=== 2000s ===
- Robin Murray, Zero Waste, London: Greenpeace, 2002
- Robin Murray, Julie Caulier-Grice and Geoff Mulgan, How to Innovate: the tools for social innovation, The Young Foundation, 2008
- Robin Murray, "Zero Waste" in Slow Food Almanac, Slow Food Editore, Bra, 2008
- Robin Murray, Julie Caulier-Grice and Geoff Mulgan, Social Venturing, Nesta, London, 2009
- Robin Murray, Danger and opportunity, Nesta, London, 2009
- Robin Murray, Julie Caulier-Grice and Geoff Mulgan, The Open Book of Social Innovation, Nesta, London, 2010.

=== 2010s ===
- Robin Murray, "Raising the Bar or Directing the Flood" in John Bowes (ed.) The Fair Trade Revolution, Pluto, 2011
- Robin Murray, Cooperation in the age of Google - A review for Co-operatives UK, 2011
- Robin Murray, ‘Global civil society and the rise of the civil economy’ in Helmut Anheier, Marlies Glasius, and Mary Kaldor (eds.) Global Civil Society 2012, Palgrave Macmillan, 2012
- Robin Murray, The new wave of mutuality: social innovation and public service reform’ Policy Network Paper, June 2012
- Robin Murray, Jeremy Gilbert & Andrew Goffey (2014), Post-post-Fordism in the era of platforms. New Formations, 84/85: Societies of Control, Winter 2014 / Summer 2015, 184-208.
- Robin Murray, ‘Prospects for innovation in the co-operative economy’ in Ed Mayo (ed.) Co-operative Advantage, Manchester, 2015
- Contributor to Can Design Catalyse the Great Transition? Papers from the Transition Design Symposium 2016

== Family ==
In 1965 Murray married Frances Herdman, whom he had known since Bedales School, and had two daughters.
