= European Fair Trade Association =

The European Fair Trade Association (EFTA) is a Dutch association established informally in 1987. It gained formal status in 1990. It regroups 11 fair trade importers in 9 European countries: Austria, Belgium, France, Germany, Italy, Netherlands, Spain, Switzerland and the United Kingdom. EFTA members include Ctm altromercato, Gepa3 Fair Handelshaus and Traidcraft. EFTA's aim is to support its member organizations in their work and encourage cooperation and coordination.

Fair trade importing organizations buy food and handicrafts from disadvantaged producers in developing countries and aim to improve market access and strengthen producer organizations. EFTA members generally follow Fairtrade Labelling Organizations International (FLO) Standards, to which additional standards may be added with the aim of providing special support to particular target groups (women, ethnic minorities, politically persecuted, etc.). In Europe, they sell their products through worldshops, local groups, wholesalers and mail order catalogues. Fair trade importing organizations also play an important role in awareness raising and in educating consumers and public authorities on fair trade and trade justice issues.

EFTA is based in Culemborg, in the Netherlands, with an office in Bolzano in northern Italy.

A three-year (2007–2010) project led by EFTA to promote action for Fair Trade Public Procurement (FTPP) aimed to encourage public authorities within the European Union to systematically include fair trade criteria in their public tenders.
