= Michael Barratt Brown =

British economist (1918–2015)

Michael Barratt Brown (15 March 1918 – 7 May 2015) was a British economist, political activist and adult educator. He was a key figure in the creation of the British New Left in the period after the Soviet invasion of Hungary; he helped to found the Fair Trade movement in Britain; and he was the first Principal of Northern College, a residential centre for adult learners in South Yorkshire.

== Life ==
Barratt Brown was born in 1918. His father, Alfred Barratt Brown, was a Quaker who was imprisoned for his opposition to the First World War. Alfred became Principal of Ruskin College, Oxford, where visitors included the philosopher Bertrand Russell, the Indian nationalist leader Gandhi and William Temple, the Anglican primate. After attending a Quaker boarding school in York, Michael Barratt Brown studied Classics at Oxford. In 1940 he joined the Friends Ambulance Unit, then switched to the United Nations Relief and Rehabilitation Administration. He later stated that his wartime experiences, particularly in Yugoslavia, led him to distance himself from his Quaker faith and join the Communist Party.

He had resigned from the Communist Party, along with a number of other radical intellectuals who objected strongly to the Soviet invasion of Hungary in 1956. He was one of the founders of New Left Review in 1960, and he contributed to the May Day Manifesto (edited by Stuart Hall, E. P. Thompson and Raymond Williams), which appeared as a Penguin Special in 1968. He also went on to help found the Institute for Workers' Control in 1968, the Conference of Socialist Economists in 1970, and the Society of Industrial Tutors in 1974.

Barratt Brown's first book was After Imperialism, described by the Marxist thinker Ernest Mandel as "one of the most important economic works recently published in English". The book critiqued the then influential theories of Lenin and Hobson, and offered a historically informed analysis of the growing power of corporate interests in the period following decolonisation. Subsequently, much of his writing took the shorter form of articles and pamphlets, often published through the Bertrand Russell Peace Foundation or the Institute for Workers' Control.

In 1978, Barratt Brown became the founding Principal of the newly opened Northern College, in Barnsley. Northern College was the first long-term adult residential college in the north of England, and was intended for adults whose opportunities for education and training had previously been limited. Based in a former aristocratic mansion, the College not only survived in the hostile political climate of the early 1980s, but rapidly acquired a reputation for educational radicalism and innovation.

After retiring in 1983, Barratt Brown went to the Greater London Council, working with its senior economist Robin Murray to produce study materials. He also returned to his interests in the developing world, helping in 1985 to found Twin Trading which went on to develop Cafédirect, the Divine Chocolate business and other fair trade brands as way of achieving more equal forms of trade between small peasant producers and consumers in developed countries. In 2013 he published an autobiography. He died on 7 May 2015 at the age of 97.
