= Lorna Young =

- Lorna Young
- Born: 15 June 1952; Dumfries, Scotland
- Died: 5 July 1996 (aged 44); Edinburgh, Scotland
- Occupation: Businesswoman
- Known for: Pioneer of Free Trade in the UK
- Partner: Iain Black
- Website: https://www.lyf.org.uk/

Lorna Young (15 June 1952 – 5 July 1996) leading contributor to bringing Fair Trade produce from third world countries to mainstream supermarkets in the UK.

== Early life ==
Young was born in Dumfries and studied as a youth and community worker at Moray House. In 1975 she left the course to pursue a career in bookselling, working for the next 15 years at the medical publishers Churchill-Livingstone and later at Chambers. She then became the Sales Director for Campaign Coffee.

== Fair trade ==
Young joined Equal Exchange, initially setup as Campaign Coffee Scotland, in the 1980s. Young introduced a commercial aspect to the charity leading to the sale of fair trade coffee in mainstream UK supermarkets for the first time.

As the first UK Sales Director of Cafedirect Young increased the market share for Fair Trade coffee across the UK. Working in partnership with Oxfam, Traidcraft and Twin Trading, Young secured the first commercial contract for Cafedirect in Co-op and Safeway's Scottish stores in 1992. Eventually leading to stock of Cafedirect in all major UK supermarket chains.

== Lorna Young Foundation ==
Setup in 2010 and named for Young, the Lorna Young Foundation raises money for sustainable farming in Africa, primarily through open source Farmer Radio programmes. The radio programmes are designed to include education on successful farming and access to information such as crop prices.

== Death and health ==
Young died suddenly in 1996, she had previously undergone three heart valve transplant operations having been born with a heart condition.

== See also ==
- Equal Exchange
- Fair Trade
- Cafedirect
- Sustainable farming
