= Alternative trading organization =

An alternative trading organization (ATO) is usually a non-governmental organization (NGO) or mission-driven business aligned with the Fair trade movement, aiming "to contribute to the alleviation of poverty in developing regions of the world by establishing a system of trade that allows marginalized producers in developing regions to gain access to developed markets".

Alternative trading organizations have Fair Trade at the core of their mission and activities, using it as a development tool to support disadvantaged producers and to reduce poverty, and combine their marketing with awareness-raising and campaigning.

Alternative trading organizations are often, but not always, based in political and religious groups, though their secular purpose precludes sectarian identification and evangelical activity. Philosophically, the grassroots political-action agenda of these organizations associates them with progressive political causes active since the 1960s: foremost, a belief in collective action and commitment to moral principles based on social, economic and trade justice.

Historically, the largest and most influential ATOs include:

- (Austria) EZA Fairer Handel
- (Belgium) Oxfam-Magasins Du Monde
- (Belgium) Oxfam-Wereldwinkels
- (Canada) Equita
- (Canada) La Siembra Cooperative
- (Canada) Plan Nagua
- (Canada) Just Us! Coffee Roasters Co-Op
- (France) Alter Eco
- (France) Éthiquable
- (France) Lobodis
- (France) Solidar'Monde
- (France) Artisans du Monde
- (France) (Brazil) Veja Sneakers
- (Germany) Gepa The Fair Trade Company
- (Germany) Ethiquable Deutschland
- (Germany) El Puente
- (Italy) CTM Altromercato
- (Netherlands) AgroFair
- (Netherlands) Fair Trade Original
- (Spain) Alternativa3
- (Spain) Ideas
- (Spain) Intermon Oxfam
- (Switzerland) Claro Fair Trade
- (Australia) Siem Fair Trade Fashion
- (United Kingdom) Cafédirect
- (United Kingdom) Equal Exchange Trading
- (United Kingdom) Traidcraft
- (United Kingdom) Oxfam Trading
- (United Kingdom) Twin Trading
- (United Kingdom) (United States) Divine Chocolate
- (United States) (Canada) Cooperative Coffees
- (United States) Ten Thousand Villages
- (United States) Equal Exchange
- (United States) SERRV International

== Principles and practices ==
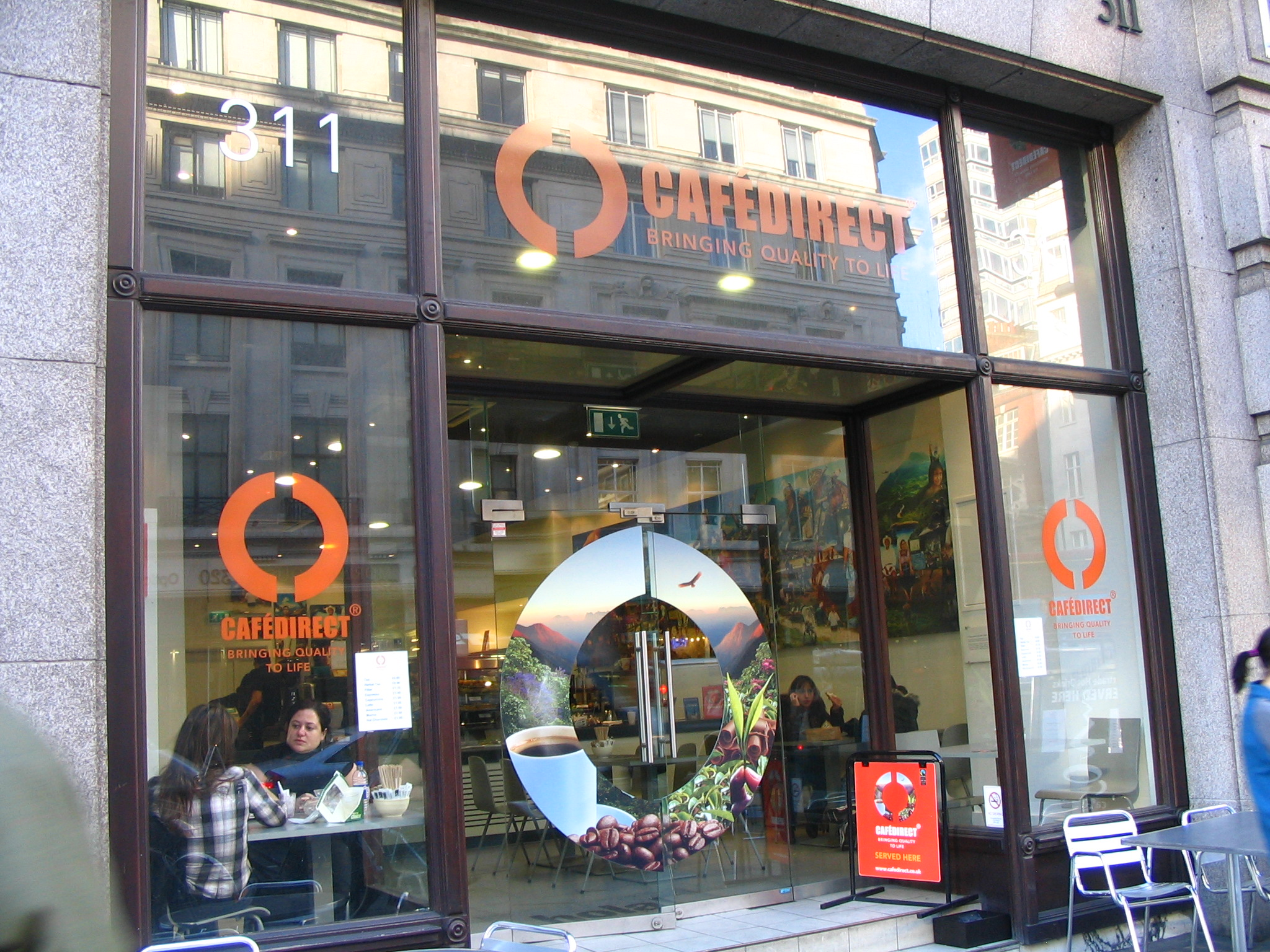
Cafedirect coffee shop on Regent Street, in central London

The defining characteristic of alternative trading organizations is that of equal partnership and respect - partnership between the developing region producers and importers, shops, labelling organizations, and consumers. Alternative trade "humanizes" the trade process - making the producer-consumer chain as short as possible so that consumers become aware of the culture, identity, and conditions in which producers live. All actors are committed to the principle of alternative trade, the need for advocacy in their working relations and the importance of awareness-raising and advocacy work. The idea of the "invisible hand" has given way to the idea of working "hand in hand" with the market regulated by democratic authorities.

Alternative Trading Organizations generally support the following Fair Trade principles and practices in trading relationships:

Creating opportunities for economically disadvantaged producers
Fair trade is a strategy for poverty alleviation and sustainable development. Its purpose is to create opportunities for producers who have been economically disadvantaged or marginalized by the conventional trading system.
Transparency and accountability
Fair trade involves transparent management and commercial relations to deal fairly and respectfully with trading partners.
Capacity building
Fair trade is a means to develop producers' independence. Fairtrade relationships provide continuity, during which producers and their marketing organizations can improve their management skills and their access to new markets.
Payment of a fair price
A fair price in the regional or local context is one that has been agreed through dialogue and participation. It covers not only the costs of production but enables production which is socially just and environmentally sound. It provides fair pay to the producers and takes into account the principle of equal pay for equal work by women and men. Fairtraders ensure prompt payment to their partners and, whenever possible, help producers with access to pre-harvest or pre-production financing.
Gender equity
Fair trade means that women's work is properly valued and rewarded. Women are always paid for their contribution to the production process and are empowered in their organizations.
Working conditions
Fair trade means a safe and healthy working environment for producers. The participation of children (if any) does not adversely affect their well-being, security, educational requirements and need for play and conforms to the UN Convention on the Rights of the Child as well as the law and norms in the local context.
Environment
Fair trade actively encourages better environmental practices and the application of responsible methods of production.
