= Ctm altromercato =

Italian trade organization

CTM Altromercato is Italy's largest alternative trading organization. It was founded in 1988 (37 years ago) in Bolzano, Italy, and originally operated as a cooperative (CTM or Cooperazione Terzo Mondo). In June 1998, the organization became a consortium of world shops called Ctm altromercato. It now includes more than 118 organisations (associations and cooperatives) which are responsible for the management of 230 worldshops throughout Italy.
