= Bob Doherty (academic) =

British academic, researcher, and former business executive

- Citizenship: British
- Occupation: Academic
- Title: Professor of Marketing

Academic background
- Education: BSc, Agricultural Environmental Science, Newcastle University (1988); MBA, Liverpool John Moores University (1999); PhD, Liverpool Business School (2009)

Academic work
- Discipline: Business and society
- Institutions: University of York; Liverpool Hope University; Liverpool John Moores University; Divine Chocolate

Bob Doherty is a British academic. He is a professor at the University of York and served as the inaugural Dean of the School for Business and Society from 2022 to 2025. His research has focused on food systems resilience, regenerative food systems, fair trade, and hybrid organisations. He has also held policy roles with the UK government's Department for Environment, Food and Rural Affairs (Defra).

== Early life and education ==
Doherty studied Agricultural Environmental Science at Newcastle University, graduating with a Bachelor of Science degree in 1988.

He completed a Master of Business Administration at Liverpool John Moores University in 1999. In 2009, he received a PhD from Liverpool Business School. He became a Fellow of the Higher Education Academy in 2006.

== Career ==
From 1999 to 2003 he served as the first Head of Sales and Marketing of Divine Chocolate.

Doherty joined Liverpool John Moores University in 2003 as senior lecturer in social enterprise and corporate social responsibility at Liverpool Business School.

In 2010 he became head of the Business and Law School at Liverpool Hope University.

Doherty joined the University of York in 2012 as Professor of Marketing. He served as deputy dean and acting dean of York Management School between 2013 and 2017 and later became inaugural dean of the School for Business and Society in 2022 following the integration of the departments of management and social policy.

He led the UK Research and Innovation-funded IKnowFood programme and the FixOurFood programme, a £6.6 million research consortium.

In 2025, Doherty became interim director of research for the University of York Mumbai campus.

== Research ==
Doherty's research has focused on fair trade, social enterprise, hybrid organisations, sustainable supply chains, and food systems resilience.

His 2014 article with Helen Haugh and Fergus Lyon, "Social enterprises as hybrid organizations: A review and research agenda", became one of the most cited papers in the International Journal of Management Reviews.

== Awards and recognition ==
Doherty received the Vice-Chancellor's Global Citizenship Award at Liverpool John Moores University in 2010. In 2019 he received the best paper award from Public Management Review. In 2020 he was awarded an ASEAN Bualuang Chair Fellowship from Thammasat University to work on social enterprise in Thailand.

== Selected publications ==
- Management for Social Enterprise (2009)
- "Social enterprises as hybrid organizations: A review and research agenda" (2014)
- Where Next for Fair Trade (2013)
- "Transformations to Regenerative Food Systems" (2021)
- "UK government food strategy lacks ambition to achieve transformative food system change" (2022)
