= GEPA =

GEPA can mean:

- Grade Eight Proficiency Assessment - New Jersey student assessment
- Gepa The Fair Trade Company - Europe's largest alternative trading organization
- Guam Environmental Protection Agency
