= Mark Gerard Hayes =

Academic background
- Education: Stonyhurst College; University of Cambridge
- Influences: John Maynard Keynes Brian Reddaway Charles Feinstein Geoffrey Harcourt Victoria Chick

Academic work
- Discipline: Macroeconomics
- School or tradition: Post-Keynesian economics
- Institutions: University of Cambridge; Durham University
- Awards: Helen Potter Prize 2006
- Website: Information at IDEAS / RePEc

Mark Gerard Hayes, pen-name M. G. Hayes (21 September 1956 - 15 December 2019), was a British-Irish economist and former banker. As an economist, he wrote mainly on the economics of John Maynard Keynes and on the economic implications of Catholic social thought. He was a Quondam Fellow in Economics of Robinson College, Cambridge, and published two books on the economics of Keynes and several scholarly articles and chapters on both his areas of research. From 2006-2016 he was the Secretary of the Post-Keynesian Economics Society (PKES, formerly known as PKSG).

Earlier in his career, he was the principal founder and first Managing Director from 1990-1999 of Shared Interest, the British co-operative society that provides a large part of the finance behind the global Fair Trade movement.

== Biography ==
Educated at Stonyhurst College and Clare College, Cambridge, where he read Economics, Mark Hayes began his working career as a banker (1978-1988) with the Industrial and Commercial Finance Corporation that became 3i in 1984. He left 3i in 1988 to become the principal founder and first Managing Director (1990-1999) of Shared Interest. After a brief period in 2001-2002 at Triodos Bank as UK Managing Director, he switched to an academic career, earning his doctorate at the University of Sunderland in 2003 under the external supervision of Malcolm Sawyer, University of Leeds.

From 2003-2006 he was a visiting fellow at Northumbria University, during which time he wrote his first book The Economics of Keynes: A New Guide to The General Theory. He won the Helen Potter Award from the Association for Social Economics in 2006 for "the best article in the Review of Social Economy by a promising scholar of social economics", 'On the efficiency of Fair Trade'.

In 2006 he became a Fellow of Robinson College, Cambridge and its Director of Studies in Economics from 2009-2014. He was also a Trustee and Senior Research Fellow of Homerton College, Cambridge from 2006-2009 and an Affiliated Lecturer in the Faculty of Economics, University of Cambridge from 2013-2015. In 2014, he moved to Durham University to become the inaugural holder of the St Hilda Chair in Catholic Social Thought and Practice in Durham's Centre for Catholic Studies, before early retirement in 2016. His second book on Keynes is John Maynard Keynes: The Art of Choosing the Right Model, published shortly before his death.

== Publications ==
=== Books ===
- John Maynard Keynes: The Art of Choosing the Right Model (Polity Press; 2019) ISBN 978 1 50952 825 7
- The Capital Finance of Co-operative and Community Benefit Societies (Co-operatives UK; 2013)
- The Economics of Keynes: A New Guide to The General Theory (Edward Elgar Publishing Ltd; 2006) ISBN 978 1 84720 082 2
- Investment and finance under fundamental uncertainty (Ph.D dissertation, University of Sunderland; 2003)

=== Papers and articles ===
- 2018. The liquidity of money, Cambridge Journal of Economics, 42 (5), 1205-1218
- 2018. Sraffa's prices of production understood in terms of Keynes's state of short-term expectation, in The General Theory and Keynes for the 21st Century, Dow, Sheila Jespersen, Jesper & Tily, Geoff (eds), Edward Elgar.
- 2018. Creation and Creativity, in Theology and Ecology Across the Disciplines: On Care for Our Common Home, Celia Deane-Drummond and Rebecca Artinian-Kaiser (eds), Bloomsbury
- 2017. Keynes's liquidity preference and the usury doctrine: their connection and continuing policy relevance, Review of Social Economy, 75 (4): 400-416
- 2013. The Vatican and the international monetary system, Review of Social Economy, 71 (3), 390-98
- 2013. The state of short-term expectation, Review of Political Economy, 25 (2), 205–24
- 2013. Ingham and Keynes on the Nature of Money, in Financial Crises and the Nature of Capitalist Money, Geoff Harcourt and Jocelyn Pixley (eds), Palgrave Macmillan
- 2013 (with Olivier Allain and Jochen Hartwig). Effective Demand: Securing the Foundations - A Symposium, Review of Political Economy, 25 (4), 650-78
- 2012. The General Theory: A Neglected Work?!, in Keynes’s General Theory For Today, Jesper Jespersen and Mogens Ove Madsen (eds), Edward Elgar
- 2012. The Efficient Markets Hypothesis, in The Elgar Companion to Post Keynesian Economics, J. E. King (ed.), Edward Elgar
- 2012. Keynes: The Neglected Theorist, in Keynes’ General Theory: 75 Years Later, Thomas Cate (ed.), Edward Elgar
- 2010. The Loanable Funds fallacy: saving, finance and equilibrium, Cambridge Journal of Economics, 34 (4), 807–20
- 2010. The fault line between Keynes and the Cambridge Keynesians: a review essay, Review of Political Economy, 22 (1), 151-60
- 2010. Mutual Enmity: deposit insurance and economic democracy, Review of Social Economy, 68 (3), 365-70
- 2009. The Post Keynesian alternative to inflation targeting (with Angel Asensio), European Journal of Economics and Economic Policies, 6 (1), 65-79
- 2008. Keynes’s Z function: a reply to Hartwig and Brady, Cambridge Journal of Economics, 32 (5), 811–14
- 2008. Keynes’s degree of competition, European Journal of the History of Economic Thought, 15 (2), 275–91
- 2008. “Fighting the Tide: Alternative Trade Organizations in the Era of Global Free Trade” – A Comment, World Development, 36 (12), 2953–61
- 2007. The point of effective demand, Review of Political Economy, 19 (1), 55–80
- 2007. Keynes’s Z function, heterogeneous output and marginal productivity, Cambridge Journal of Economics, 31 (5), 741-53
- 2006. Value and probability, Journal of Post Keynesian Economics, 28 (3), 527–38
- 2006. On the efficiency of Fair Trade, Review of Social Economy, 64 (4), 447–68
- 2006. Lucas on involuntary unemployment, Cambridge Journal of Economics, 30 (3), 473–7
- 2006. Financial Bubbles, in A Handbook of Alternative Monetary Economics, Philip Arestis and Malcolm Sawyer (eds), Edward Elgar
- 1993. Shared Interest and Co-operation, Journal of Co-operative Studies, 76, 39-43
