= Shared Interest =

Financial services provider that supports fair trade organisations

- Type: Co-operative
- Industry: Financial Services (Fair Trade)
- Founded: October 1990; 36 years ago
- Headquarters: Pearl Assurance House, 7 New Bridge Street West, Newcastle, NE1 1EH, Tyne & Wear
- Key people: Patricia Alexander (Managing director)
- Revenue: 1,643,643 United States dollar (2016)
- Total assets: £43 million GBP in share capital (2019)
- Number of employees: 36
- Website: Official website

Shared Interest Society Limited is a fair trade financial co-operative based in the United Kingdom formed in 1990. Today it provides credit and financial services to fair trade producers, retailers, importers and exporters throughout the world. Shared Interest works with both Fairtrade International (formerly known as Fairtrade Labelling Organizations or FLO) and the World Fair Trade Organization (WFTO). In 2004, the Shared Interest Foundation was formed as a charitable subsidiary, providing training and support services to producers, complementing the financial services offered by the Society. Shared Interest received the Queen's Award for Enterprise in 2008.

== History ==
The idea that led to Shared Interest was the creation of Mark Gerard Hayes, then an investment banker with 3i, now an academic economist at Cambridge University, who was the first managing director from 1990 to 1999. Inspired by the success of Traidcraft in harnessing socially responsible investment for the finance of fair trade, Hayes approached Traidcraft founder Richard Adams in 1986, beginning a collaboration that culminated in the formation of Shared Interest in 1990 as a special form of co-operative saving and loan society.

The initial £100,000 funding (subsequently repaid) for the launch of the Society came from Traidcraft, Joseph Rowntree Charitable Trust, and a similar co-operative established in 1975 in the Netherlands, now called Oikocredit. However the creation of Shared Interest was finally made possible by the action of SIAL (Scottish Churches Action for World Development Investment Association Limited), an Oikocredit Support Association, who provided the first 200 members and £300,000 of capital in the form of shares in Oikocredit. Oikocredit was Shared Interest's main channel for lending in its first five years.

Once Shared Interest had reached a capital of £4 million (1994), a planned transition took place to establish its own lending business by the creation of a clearing house with what is now the World Fair Trade Organization, to finance directly fair trade between the Global North and Global South and increasingly within Southern markets themselves. Shared Interest continued to support Oikocredit by the issue of loan stock until 2005, after which Oikocredit established its own UK office.

== Structure ==
=== Shared Interest Society Limited ===
The Society is registered under the Co-operative and Community Benefit Societies Act 2014. Its membership is almost entirely composed of UK individuals (some 11,500 in 2018), who invest withdrawable share capital (£43 million in 2019), which is used to provide credit facilities to organisations engaged in fair trade. The society had 34 staff (2012), mostly in the UK, with established regional offices around the world.

The Society is unusual in having a council of ordinary members as well as a Board of Directors. Both bodies are elected; the Council acts as a select committee which scrutinises the work of the Board. Furthermore, a majority of the members of Council are nominated for election by a process of random selection, similar to jury service, in the interests of wider participation.

By opening an account, a person becomes a member of the Society and buys non-transferable withdrawable shares to the value of their investment. £1 buys one share and people can invest between £100 and £100,000. Shared Interest is the only accredited open share offer to have received the Community Shares Standard five years ago. It is different from a charitable donation as, once your account is open, a person can withdraw money from their account as well as add to it. All members have an equal voice regardless of the amount in their account.

=== Shared Interest Foundation ===
In 2004, Shared Interest Society Ltd. established a subsidiary charity, to provide business and financial management training for fair trade organisations, as well as grants to support individual organisations and the fair trade movement as a whole. To date, the Foundation's work has been funded largely by donations from the Society's members.

== The nature of the financial requirement ==
International trade and production involves long processes which take much time. For example, many months elapse between the sowing of a crop in the tropics and the final purchase by a consumer of a finished product in a European supermarket. The money laid out at each stage of production and distribution is called working capital. For smaller producer organisations to access international markets on terms consistent with their independence, if at all, requires access to working capital, by both producers and fair trade distributors, beyond what is available from banks. Normally this extra working capital would come from profit-maximising shareholders in some form or from accumulated past profits. Shared Interest provides unsecured finance, similar to trade credit. Shared Interest can do this only because its own members are prepared to accept the risk of loss on their investment in Shared Interest, and to accept the limited and currently lower financial returns resulting from the high costs of dealing with emerging organisations in the Global South.

In 2018, Shared Interest lent money to 363 organisations representing 470,421 individuals. They worked in areas where other lenders are less keen to operate in order to deepen impact and support those farmers in greatest need. Very few social lenders operate with smaller lending facilities or more vulnerable groups. Shared Interest works primarily with organisations who are certified as fair trade as they believe these producers align with their own values. The fair trade movement aims to promote fair and equal trading terms for producers in developing countries. It is based around ten key principles:

• Creating Opportunities for Economically Disadvantaged Producers • Transparency and Accountability • Fair Trading Practices • Payment of a Fair Price • Ensuring no Child Labour and Forced Labour • Commitment to Non Discrimination, Gender Equity and Women's Economic Empowerment, and Freedom of Association • Ensuring Good Working Conditions • Providing Capacity Building • Promoting Fair Trade • Respect for the Environment

== The finance mechanism ==

The diagram illustrates the lending process:

1. The order is placed by a buyer (e.g. a coffee importer) with the producer (e.g. a coffee farming co-operative)
2. Shared Interest makes an advance payment on behalf of buyers to the producers
3. The producer is able to borrow an additional amount against that order to cover their expenses
4. The goods are delivered
5. The final payment is made to the producer; the buyer re-pays the credit provided by Shared Interest

== See also ==
- List of European cooperative banks
