= Richard Adams (businessman) =

British businessman and social entrepreneur (born 1946)

Richard John Adams OBE (born 28 October 1946) is a British businessman and social entrepreneur. He is the founder of the UK fair trade organisations Tearcraft and Traidcraft and of a number of social enterprises which promote environmentally responsible and ethical business.

Richard Adams, Lublin, 2021

== Early life and education ==
Adams attended King Edward VI Five Ways school in Birmingham. He has degrees in sociology (St John's College, Durham University), theology (University of London) and business administration (Newcastle University). He received an honorary Doctorate of Civil Law in 2005 from Newcastle University and one from Durham University in 2007. He also holds a National Licensee's Certificate for on-licensed premises.

== Career ==
After visiting small farmers in Gujarat, India, in 1973 Adams and Michael Schluter established Agrofax Labour Intensive Products, an agricultural imports company in London with distribution to the main wholesale markets. In 1974 this business began importing crafts from farming communities in Bangladesh, following which he founded Tearcraft which became the marketing arm of the UK relief and development charity, Tearfund.

In 1979 Adams established the independent company Traidcraft, which became a plc in 1984, offering the first 'alternative' and socially orientated public share issue in the UK. In 1989 Adams convened the steering committee of what became the UK's Fairtrade Foundation, based on the Dutch Max Havelaar Foundation. He was its founding director, and a member of its board from 1992 to 1999.

In 1994 Adams founded the Creative Consumer Co-operative, through which Out of this World, Britain's first chain of organic grocery stores with an explicit ethical, fair trade, social and environmental agenda, were launched. In 2000 he co-founded the Warm Zone programme to combat fuel poverty and in 2006 was appointed as a non-executive director of Newcastle upon Tyne NHS Primary Care Trust and in 2010 was appointed Chair of Newcastle and North Tyneside Community Health (NHS).

Adams was a director of the UK Social Investment Forum 1992–1996; Chair of the Student Christian Movement 1994–1997 and, with Mark Hayes, a co-initiator and founding director of the social investment society, Shared Interest. He was appointed by the UK Government in 2001 as one of 24 UK members of the Brussels–based Economic and Social Committee of the European Union, serving for 14 years and then as a Delegate to the EESC's Consultative Commission on Industrial Change until the UK's exit from the EU. In this role he worked mainly on energy and climate related issues and has been involved in animal welfare, fisheries' sustainability, transport and agricultural issues. He was co-chair of the European Nuclear Energy Forum (ENEF) from 2011 to 2014, was until 2018 a member of the Corporate Responsibility Stakeholder Council of Innogy SE and was a Trustee of the energy policy think-tank, Sustainability First. He chairs the board of directors of the Fair Trade Advocacy Office in Brussels. In 2026 he co-authored a book - The Phantom Daubers of Durham - with Geoffrey Howard, recounting student days in the 1960s.

== Honours ==
Adams is a visiting fellow of St John's College, Durham and a visiting professor at Northumbria University. In the 2001 New Year Honours, he was appointed an Officer of the Order of the British Empire (OBE) "for services to the promotion of ethical trading". He won the New Statesman Social Entrepreneur of the Year award in 2005 and in 2006 was listed by The Independent newspaper as one of the top 50 people in the UK who had had most impact in "making the world a better place" for his development of the concept of ethical shopping.

== Bibliography ==
- Who Profits? (1989) ISBN 0-7459-1606-6
- Shopping for a Better World (1991) ISBN 0-7494-0483-3
- Changing Corporate Values (1991) ISBN 0-7494-0410-8
- Good Business? (1993) ISBN 1-873575-58-0
- The Phantom Daubers of Durham (2026) ISBN 978-1-0667351-2-9
