= Kuapa Kokoo =

Fairtrade-certified cocoa farmers organisation in Ghana

- Formation: 1993; 33 years ago
- Purpose: Farming
- Location: Ghana
- Members: 100,000
- Affiliations: Twin Trading, Christian Aid, The Body Shop, Divine Chocolate

Kuapa Kokoo is a Fairtrade-certified cocoa farmers organisation in Ghana. The organisation was established in 1993 by a group of cocoa farmers from Ghana with support from Twin Trading, Christian Aid and The Body Shop. They are based in Ghana and currently have over 100,000 registered members.

The Day Chocolate Company (a UK company, now Divine Chocolate) was set up by Kuapa Kokoo and Twin Trading in 1997. The company primarily uses Kuapa's cocoa, and the cooperative also holds 20% of Divine Chocolate's stock. Kuapa uses its Fairtrade premium to pay bonuses to members, and invests in social projects, such as schools, bore-holes for drinking water, and mobile clinics.
