= Alter Eco =

Alternative trading organization

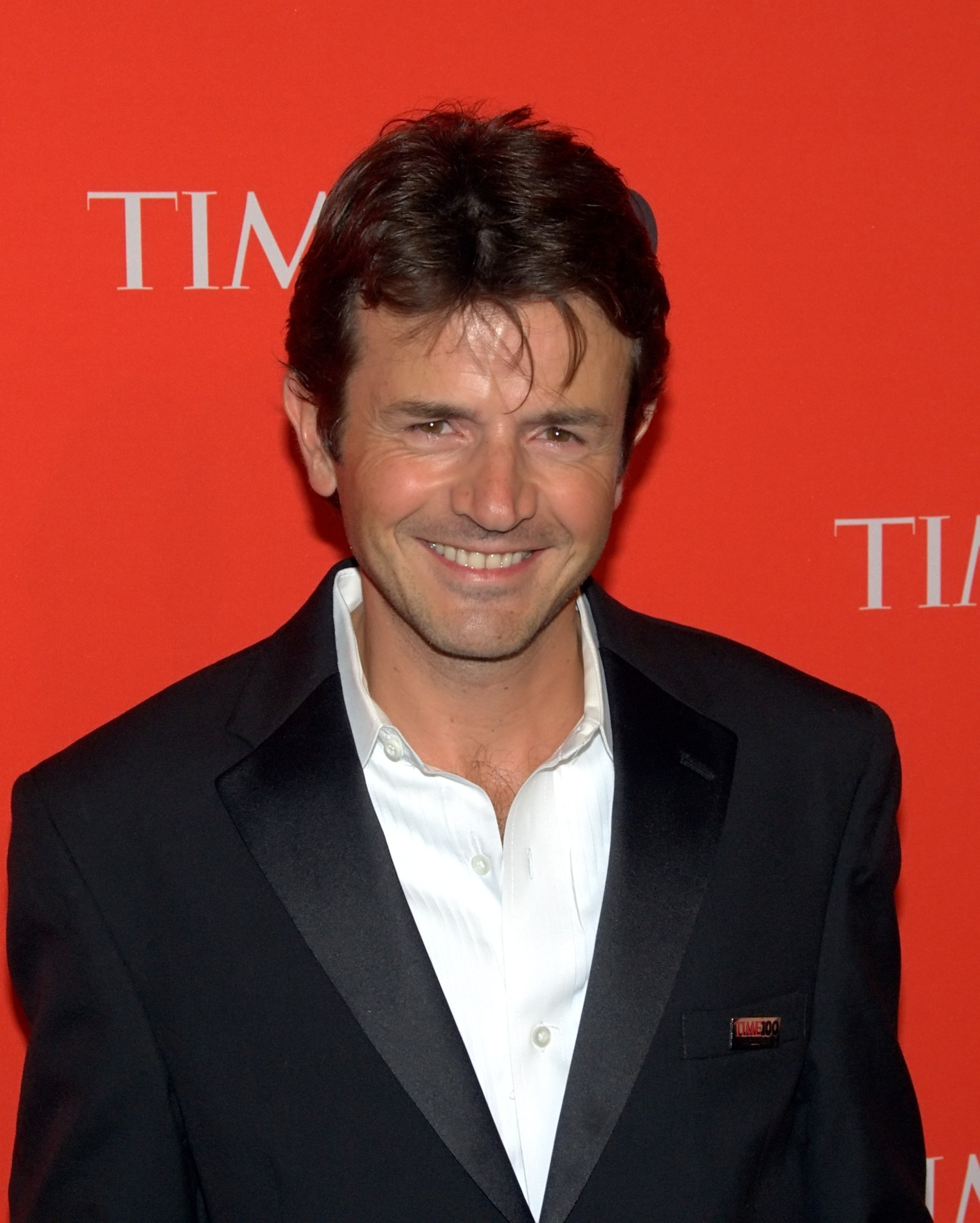
Founder Tristan Lecomte

Alter Eco refers to two alternative trading organizations, the first of which was founded in 1998 by Tristan Lecomte in France, and followed by Mathieu Senard and Edouard Rollet in the United States, and Ilse Keijzer in Australia.

== Alter Eco France ==
Alter Eco France specializes in fair trade and "responsible" food products. The organization is part of the fair trade movement and offers its products in several French mass retailers such as Monoprix, Cora, Match, Système U, E.Leclerc and Carrefour. As of 2007, there are over 100 Alter Eco Fair Trade products on the market, sourced from 42 cooperatives in 37 countries. Some Alter Eco Fair Trade products include coffee, tea, rice, sugar, quinoa, chocolate, olive oil, juice and cotton balls.

In 2006, Alter Eco France approached Brazilian retailers to sell Brazilian products in the country under Fair Trade terms, creating the first South-South Fair Trade experiment. In Europe, Alter Eco products are either FLO-CERT certified and bear the International Fairtrade Certification Mark, or are Fair For Life certified via the control body Ecocert.

== Alter Eco United States, Canada and Australia ==
In 2005, Alter Eco expanded into the United States and Canadian markets. Headquartered in San Francisco. Headquartered in Melbourne, Alter Eco Australia is part of the larger Alter Eco US company. Alter Eco US acquired Alter Eco Australia in 2015.

Alter Eco sells chocolate and chocolate-centric snack products. This includes a line of chocolate bars, chocolate truffles, and dark chocolate coconut clusters.

== History ==
Alter Eco in the US and Canada was started in 2003 by Mathieu Senard and Edouard Rollet. Mathieu and Edouard started the North America company. The first products began to be sold in 2005. The company was started in San Francisco and is still based there.

In 2009, Alter Eco became a certified B Corp. This was followed in 2013 when it became one of the first companies to become a registered public benefit corporation in Delaware.

Alter Eco in North America acquired Alter Eco Pacific in 2015. Alter Eco Pacific was originally started by Ilse Keijzer in 2005 and is based in Melbourne, Australia. It supplies product throughout Australia and New Zealand.

=== Awards and recognition ===
In 2016, the company was awarded Delicious Living magazine's Best Bite Aware for the Best Chocolate Bar for its 85% cacao Dark Blackout bar. The company also received the NEXT Award in this year for Best Packaging for its compostable quinoa pouch.

In 2017, the company was put on the Inc. 5000 list of fastest growing private companies for 2017. At the time, the company had a 198% three year growth with revenues of $20 million.

The company was ranked second on the 2022 Chocolate Scorecard which rates chocolate companies according to their human rights and environmental credentials: traceability and transparency, living income for cocoa farmers, absence of child labour, deforestation & climate, agroforestry and agrochemical management. (https://www.chocolatescorecard.com/)

=== Acquisition and rebranding ===
The company rebranded in 2017, updating its logo and packaging, and switching to a new motto—Enlightened Indulgence. Alter Eco was also acquired by NextWorld Evergreen, a San Francisco-based private equity firm focused on purpose driven brands, in December 2017. In October 2018, Mike Forbes was named CEO of the company. Mathieu and Edouard remained as co-founders of the company.

== Products ==
Alter Eco produces a line of chocolate and chocolate-centric products. The company formerly sourced and sold coffee, tea, rice, olive oil and hearts of palm as part of their original push to spread fair trade products. The company has since changed to focus their products around chocolate and quinoa because of the better opportunities for a growing company to focus on one main supply versus a line of different goods.

The company produces a line of chocolate bars and chocolate truffles that are organic, non-GMO, and fair trade, and some are vegan. The chocolate is manufactured in Switzerland. The chocolate bars come in 10 flavors such as Brown Butter, and Super Blackout, which is 90% cacao. The truffles come in five flavors: Classic Dark, Sea Salt, Salted Caramel, Mint Crème, and Silk Velvet.

In 2018, Alter Eco entered the snacking category with its Coconut Cluster products, available in Original, Seeds and Salt, and Cherry and Almond Butter. The products were launched at the 2018 Natural Products Expo and were one of VegNews magazine's best new vegan products.

== Full circle sustainability ==
In 2016, the company began publishing a Social Impact Report. The company has a four pronged approach to sustainability:

Choose clean ingredients

Alter Eco sources only organic and non-gmo products and works with its farmers to transition their cultivation to more sustainable and cleaner practices. The company places importance on traceability, and also removes or substitutes ingredients that are generally unsustainable or unhealthy. For example, the company uses coconut oil instead of palm oil in its products. The products are all organic certified and non-gmo verified.
