= Equal Exchange Trading =

UK worker cooperative

Equal Exchange Trading Ltd
- Type: Co-operative, Ltd
- Founded: Edinburgh, UK (1990; 36 years ago)
- Headquarters: Edinburgh, UK
- Products: Coffee, Tea, Cocoa, Nuts, Edible oils, Chapman's nut butters
- Revenue: £3.5 million (Draft 2007/08)
- Website: www.equalexchange.co.uk
- Footnotes; Founded from the trading activities of Equal Exchange Ltd (formerly Campaign Coffee Scotland) which was founded in 1981. Origins stretch back to 1979.

Equal Exchange Trading is a UK-based alternative trading organisation. Equal Exchange is a worker's cooperative distributing food and beverage products in the independent natural food sector. The organization's origins stretch back to 1979 "when three voluntary workers returned to Edinburgh after working on aid projects in various parts of Africa."

Over 90% of the company's products are both Organic and Fairtrade.

== Priorities ==
Equal Exchange Trading insists on having its teas packed at the source so that the economic benefits of this 'value-added' activity stay in the country and region of origin.

== Achievements ==
- In 1991, together with Oxfam, Traidcraft & Twin Trading they launched Cafédirect, the UK's first mainstream Fairtrade coffee brand.
- In 1998 they launched the first honey product to carry the Fairtrade Mark.
- In 2005 their best-selling product, Medium Roast Coffee, became top-rated by Ethiscore.
- In 2006 they became the first company in the United Kingdom to sign a license agreement with Ethiopia's Intellectual Property Office to distribute its trademarked coffees.
- In 2007 together with Twin Trading they helped to found Liberation Foods CIC, the UK's first and only 100% Fairtrade Nut company.
- In 2009 they launched the world's first range Organic Fairtrade-certified Palestinian Extra Virgin Olive Oils.
- In 2012 Equal Exchange won the Co-operatives UK "Small Co-op : Big Achiever" award at the International Co-operative Alliance EXPO

== Awards ==
- 2005, Equal Exchange Amazon Flame Brazil Nut Oil wins Gold Great Taste Award
- 2008, Equal Exchange nominated for Ethical Business of the Year at the Observer Ethical Awards
