= Artisans du Monde =

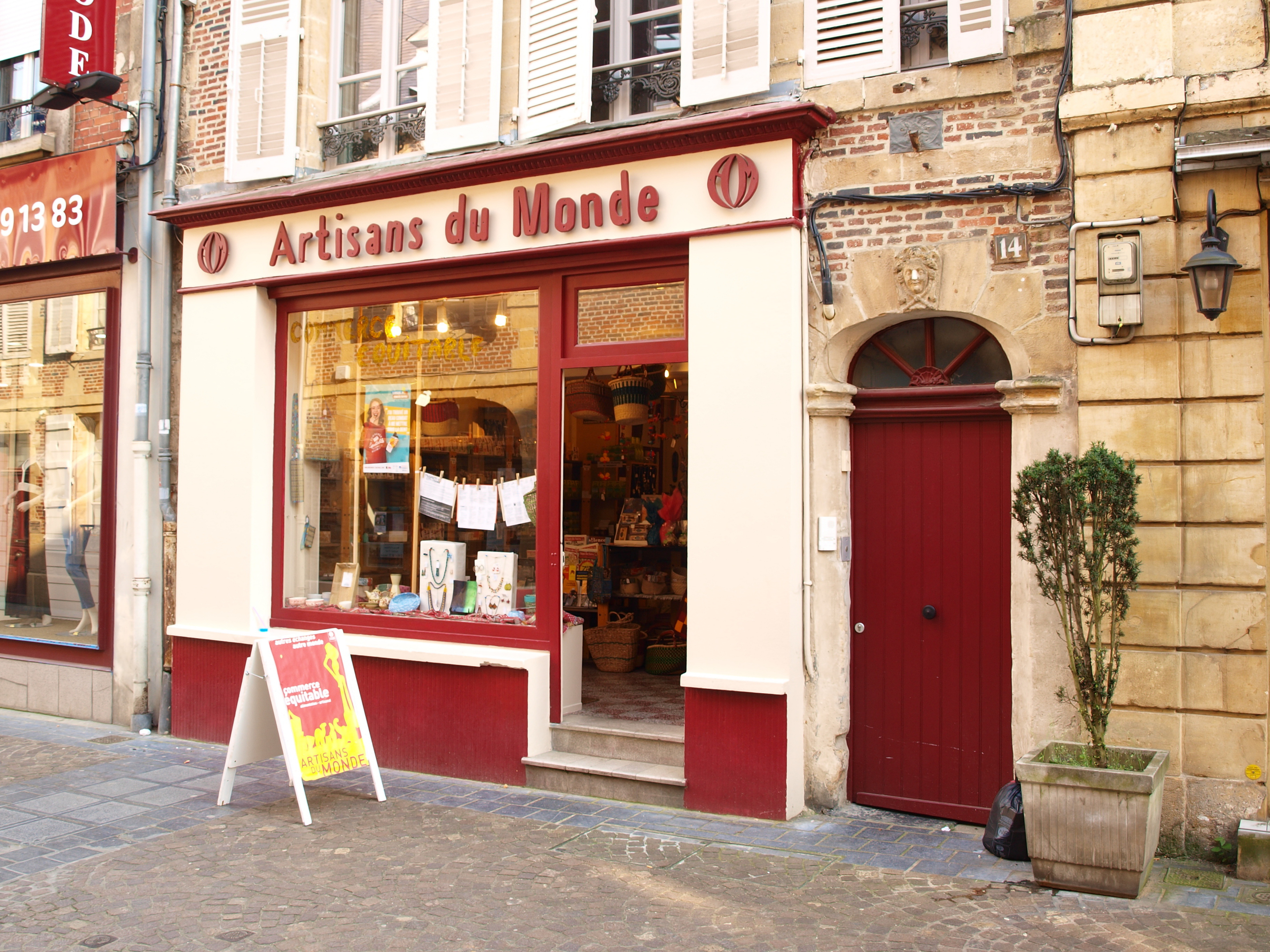
Artisans du Monde shop in Charleville-Mézières, France

Artisans du monde is a French network of local fair trade associations, currently the most important non-profit fair trade movement in France. The first associations were founded in 1974, and their number then increased to reach 170 today. Most of them manage local fair trade shops (also called worldshops), but their tasks include also awareness raising activities, and educational interventions in schools.

The Fédération Artisans du Monde, a non-profit federation of all the local associations based in Paris, represents them and coordinates their activities. It owns the majority of the capital of Solidar'Monde, a fair trade corporation which provides most of the products sold in the local shops of the Artisans du Monde network. The Fédération Artisans du Monde is a member of the French Plate-forme française pour le commerce équitable, and of the World Fair Trade Organization.
