= Cafédirect =

UK-based alternative trading organization

Cafédirect PLC
- Type: Public
- Industry: Fairtrade coffee
- Founded: 1991; 35 years ago
- Headquarters: London, United Kingdom
- Key people: John Steel (CEO); John Phillips (Chairman)
- Products: Coffee
- Website: www.cafedirect.co.uk

Cafédirect is a UK-based alternative trading organisation that sells Fairtrade coffee.

== History ==
Cafédirect was founded in 1991 by Oxfam, Traidcraft, Equal Exchange Trading and Twin Trading as a response to the 1989 global collapse in coffee prices. Its aims was to "give coffee bean, cocoa and tea growers a larger slice of the purchase price for the products".

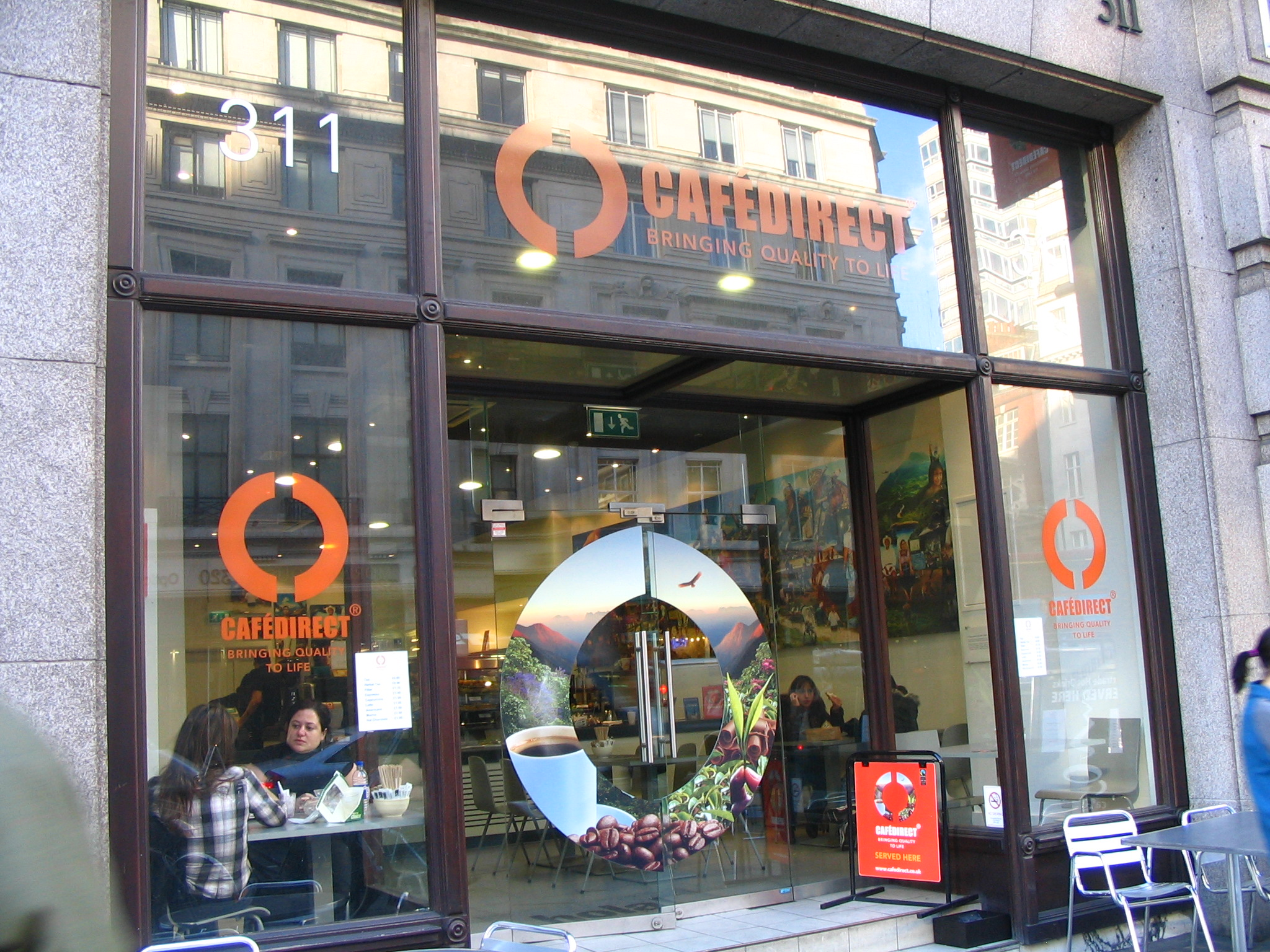
Cafédirect coffee shop in London, 2008

Cafédirect secured its first commercial contract for Co-op and Safeway's Scottish stores in 1992. Very early on, the brand was endorsed by Secretary of State for International Development Clare Short.

CaféDirect was the first coffee brand to carry the Fairtrade certification mark. The company reinvests about 60pc of its profits into grower training and development programmes.

In February 2004, the company released more share floats on the stock market in a move to raise $9.1 million.

In 2007, the company's market share for hot drinks equated to 34%, 32%, and 14% respectively of the UK's Fairtrade coffee, tea, and drinking chocolate markets. In the overall market, Cafédirect is the fifth largest coffee brand and previously was the seventh largest tea brand in the UK.

In May 2014, CaféDirect purchased Kopi, one of the largest coffee subscription services in the UK. In April 2019, Cafédirect partnered with Waitrose to launch a small batch of premium coffee products.

Cafédirect stopped selling tea and drinking chocolate in around 2024 without comment.

== Producer support programmes ==
Cafédirect has established the Gold Standard, a guarantee to pay above the world market price for coffee, and to support the development of producers. Between 2004 and 2009, Cafédirect paid more than £7.5 million above the market price to growers (including Fairtrade premiums), invested over £3 million in tailor-made programmes to strengthen growers’ businesses, which represents more than 50% of the company's profits and in total, paid more than £10.5 million towards the businesses and communities of their grower partners.

In addition to paying a fair price to growers in developing countries, the company donates a percentage of its profits to producers for activities such as market information and management training. Its Producer Partnership Programme (PPP) "was set up in 1996 and goes above and beyond Fairtrade criteria". In 2007, the company invested £600,000 in PPP and these investments attracted, without additional cost to the company, matched funds of £700,000, meaning growers benefited from a total investment of £1.3 million.

== Awards ==
- 2008–2011: 15 Gold Great Taste Awards from the Guild of Fine Food.
- 2011: Social Impact award at the 2011 Guardian Sustainable Business Awards for its Producer Partnership Programme (PPP).
- 2013: 'Best Ethical Brand' in the Good Housekeeping Food Awards and its Decaf Roast & Ground coffee won a Great Taste Award. Its Foodservice Decaf Espresso blend won a '3 Star' award.

== See also ==
- Equal Exchange
- Lorna Young
