= Gepa The Fair Trade Company =

GEPA - The Fair Trade Company

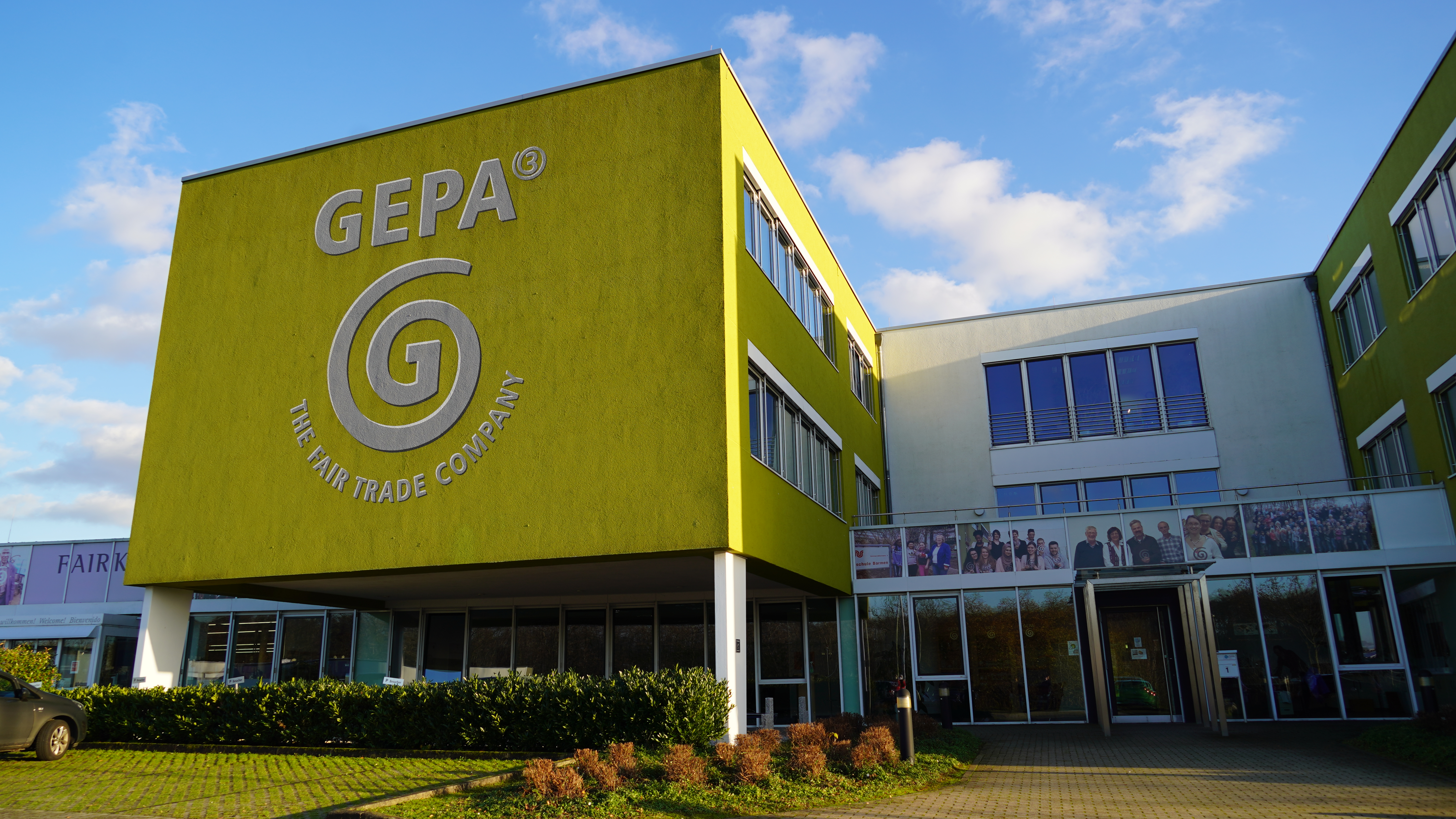
- Building in Wuppertal
- Type: Non-profit organization
- Industry: Fair trade
- Founded: 14 May 1975; 51 years ago
- Headquarters: Wuppertal, Germany
- Products: Coffee, Tea, Cocoa, Handicraft, Honey, Nuts, Rice, Wine, Jewelry, Textiles etc.
- Revenue: 84.8 million EUR (2024)
- Number of employees: 157 (2024)
- Website: www.gepa.de

The GEPA is Europe's largest alternative trading organisation. The abbreviation GEPA³ stands for "Gesellschaft zur Förderung der Partnerschaft mit der Dritten Welt mbH“, literally meaning "Society for the Promotion of Partnership with the Third World".

== Main Goal ==
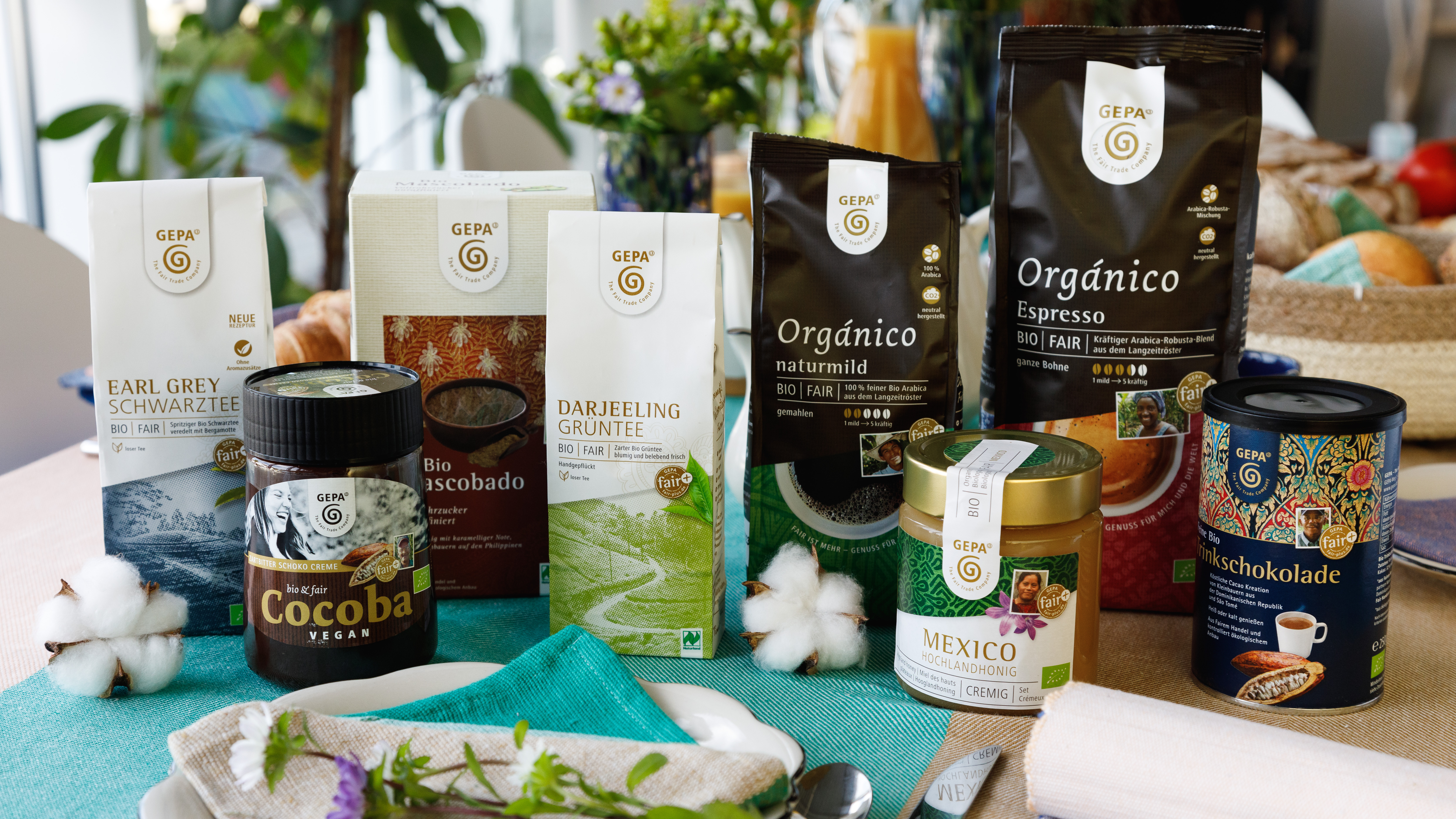
GEPA products, 2022

The main goal of GEPA is to improve the living and working conditions of people in the Global South, following the spirit of the UN Agenda 21 for economic, social and ecological sustainability.

== Partners of GEPA ==
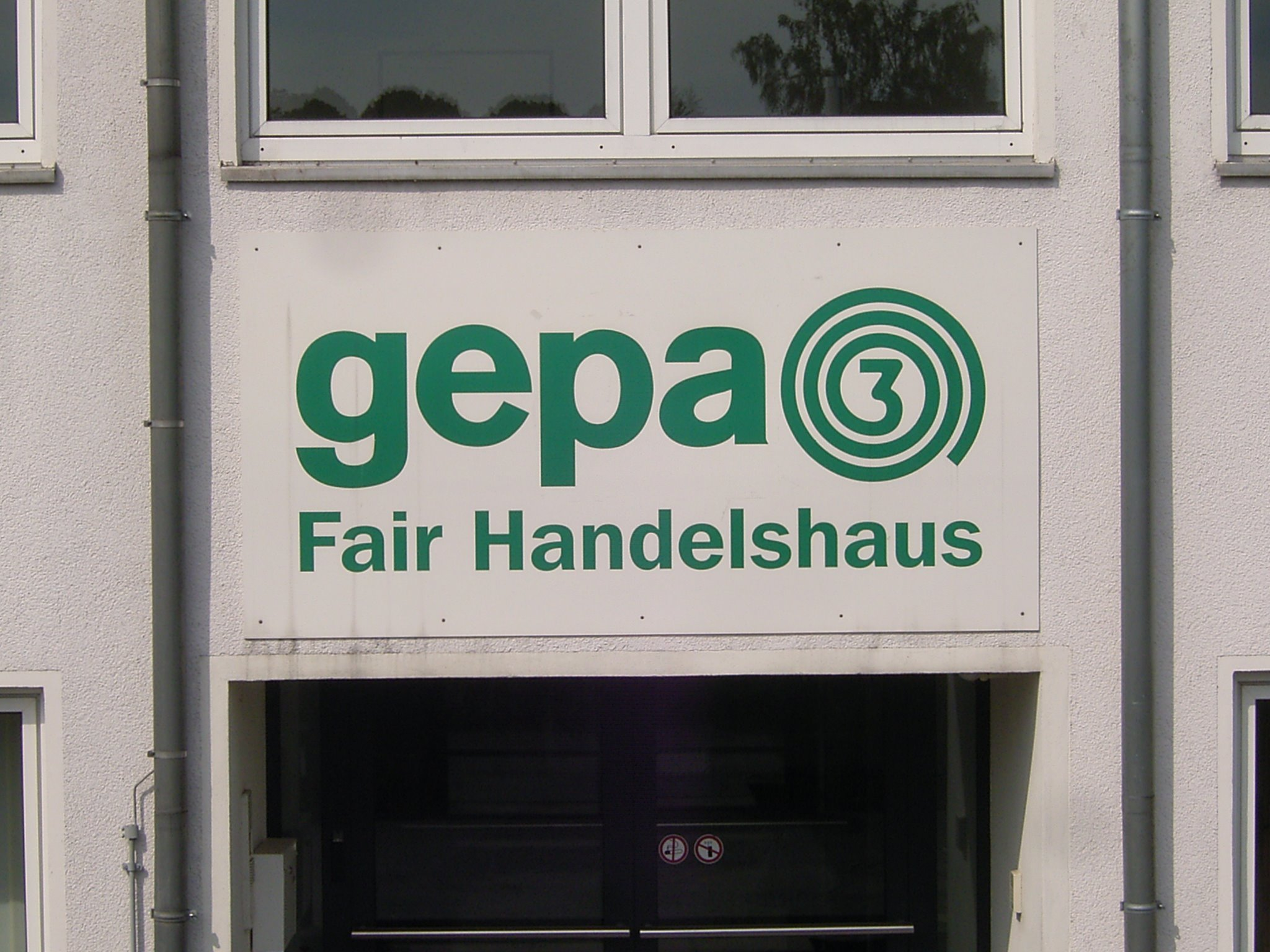
GEPA building, Wuppertal

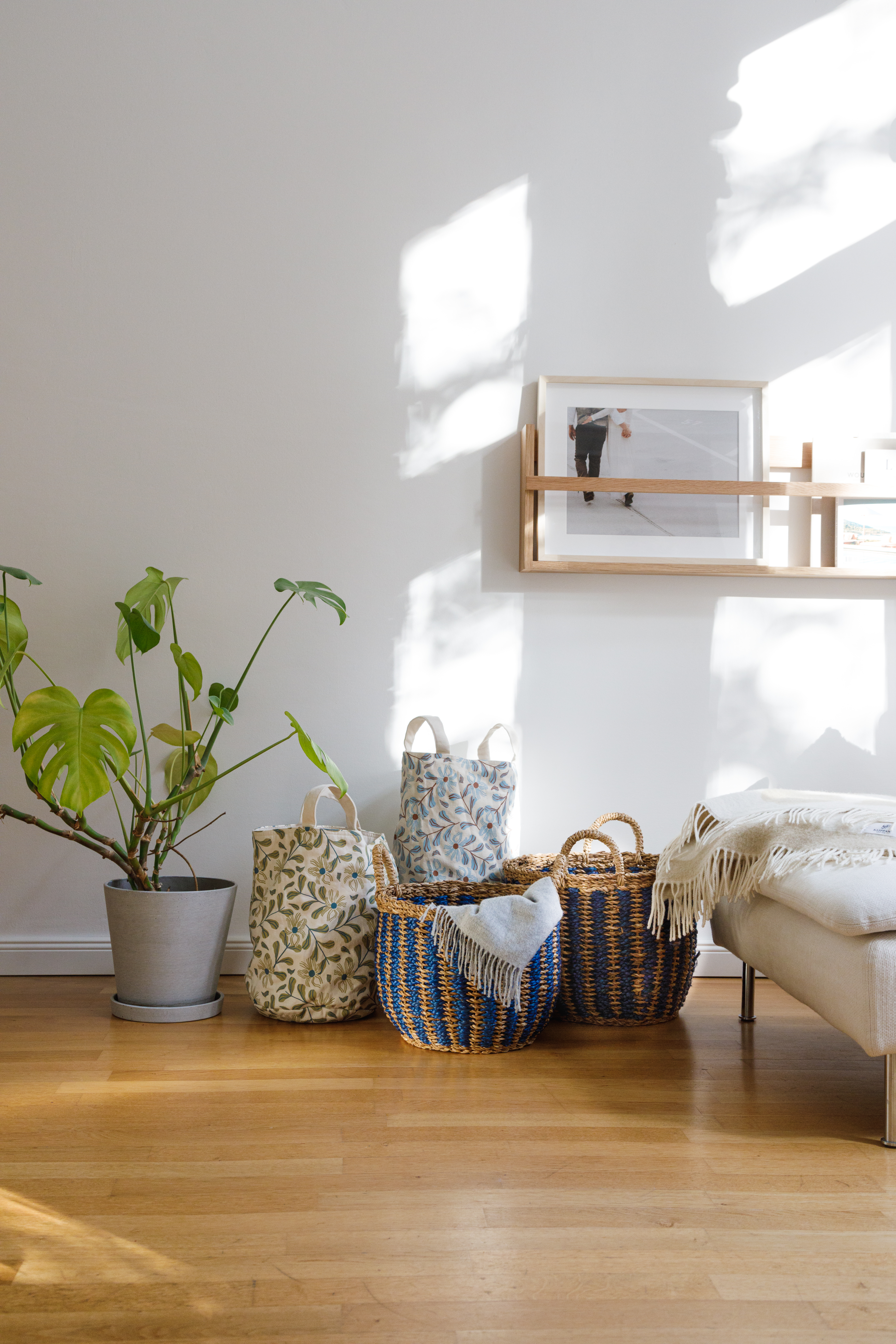
GEPA homeware

- Evangelischer Entwicklungsdienst (EED) (Evangelical Development Service),
- Bischöfliches Hilfswerk Misereor der Katholischen Kirche (Misereor Episcopal Welfare Organisation of the Catholic Church),
- Arbeitsgemeinschaft der Evangelischen Jugend (aej) (Consortium of the Evangelical Youth),
- Bund der Deutschen Katholischen Jugend (BDKJ) (Federation of the German Catholic Youth),
- Päpstliches Missionswerk der Kinder in Deutschland e.V. (PMK) Papal Missionary work of Children in Germany (since 25 October 2004).

== Sale Structure ==
15 regional fair trade centres in the Federal Republic of Germany supply approximately 800 shops worldwide and roughly 6,000 action groups with fairly traded groceries and handcrafted products. Numerous supermarkets and food retailers also sell GEPA products. Business canteens, student unions, conference houses etc. are provided by GEPA on a wholesaler basis. The GEPA website also has an online shop. GEPA is the largest European importer of fair trade food items from the Global South.

The "Regionalen Fair Handelszentren" or RFZ (Regional Commercial Fairs) are partly owned by GEPA with the other part belonging to independent sponsors.

- RFZs sponsored by GEPA themselves:

- West (Wuppertal)
- Central (Alzenau)
- South (Leonberg)
- Fair Trade Centre (Berlin)

- RFZs sponsored independently:

- Saarland (Saarbrücken)
- North (Hamburg)
- Bavaria (Haimhausen/Amperpettenbach)
- Saxony (Dresden)
- Aachen
- Bad Abbach
- Bonn
- Cadolzburg
- Münster
- Munich
- Northeim

== Membership ==
GEPA is a FLO International registered Fairtrade licensee and importer. The organization is also a licensee of Naturland Zeichen GmbH and a member of the European Fair Trade Association (EFTA), the World Fair Trade Organization (WFTO) and the Forums Fairer Handel.

== Campaigns ==
- As a member in the Forum Fairer Handel, taking part in the Fairen Woche ("Fair Week") organisation.
- Together with the Weltladen-Dachverband, leading a campaign for the development of activities ("Professionalisation") of Weltladen until 2006.
