= Twin Trading =

British alternative trading company

Twin Trading was an alternative trading company in the United Kingdom. It was founded in 1985 and was based in London.

Twin Trading was wholly owned by Twin, a registered charity and membership organisation. It was co-founded by economist Michael Barratt Brown, who was also at one time its chairman. He stood down from the Board in August 2007.

Twin was founded as the Third World Information Network with the support of the Greater London Council. In 1988 it began to import coffee, sold through Oxfam and Traidcraft, leading to the 1988 founding of Cafédirect by Twin with Oxfam, Traidcraft and Equal Exchange Trading. In 1993, Twin helped chocolate farmers in Ghana to found the Kuapa Kokoo co-operative, and in 1998 Divine Chocolate was formed, largely owned by Kuapa Kokoo, to market Fairtrade chocolate. Twin also launched OKÉ and Liberation Nuts.

In November 2019 it was bought by Sustainable Harvest, a United States–based green coffee importer.
