= Worldshop =

Specialized fair trade retail shops

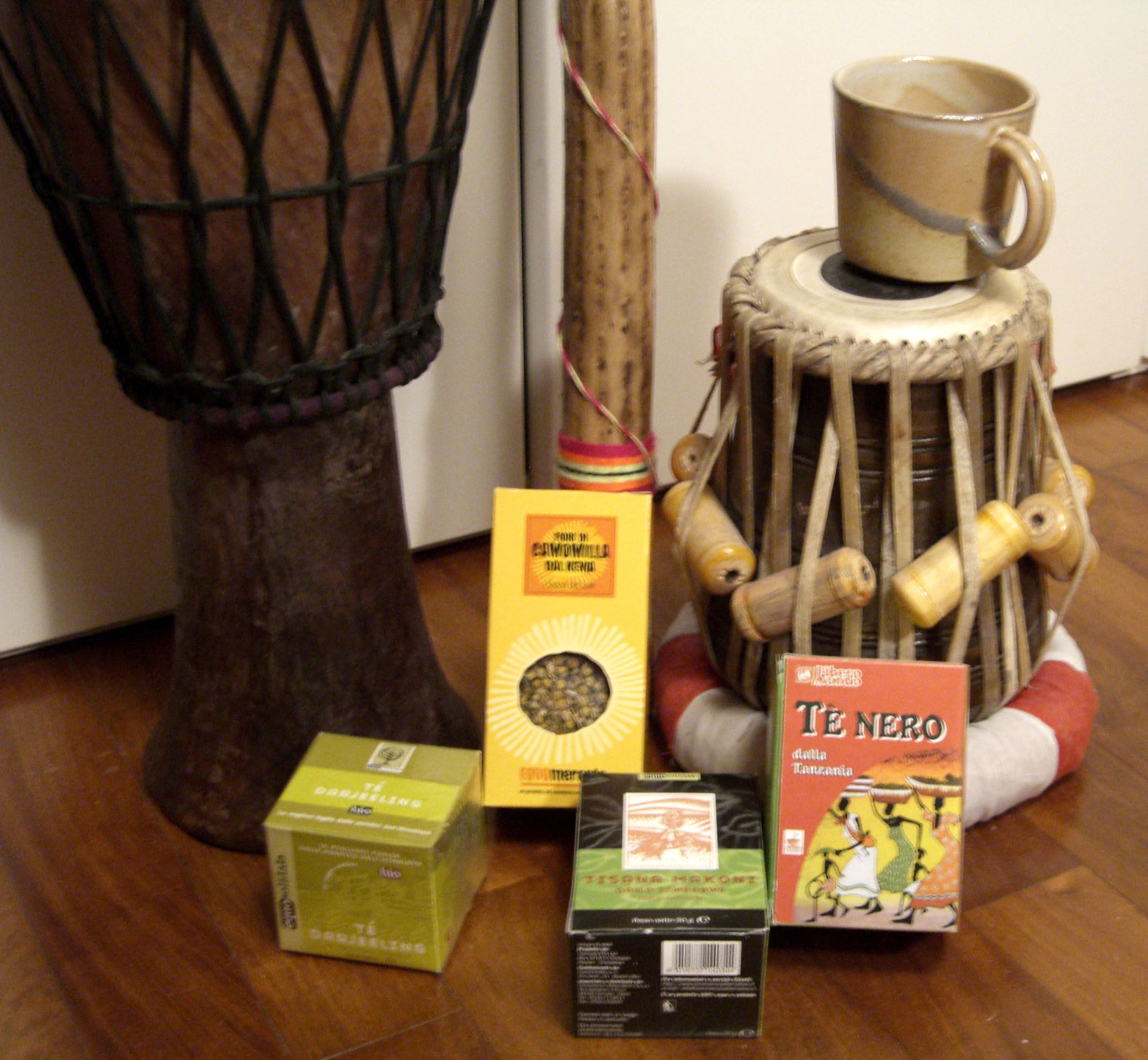
Fair Trade goods sold in an Italian Worldshop

Worldshops, world shops or Fair Trade Shops are specialized retail outlets offering and promoting Fair Trade products. Worldshops also typically organize various educational Fair Trade activities and play an active role in trade justice and other North-South political campaigns.

Worldshops are often not-for-profit organizations and run by locally based volunteer networks.

Although the movement emerged in Europe and a vast majority of worldshops are still based on the continent, worldshops can also be found today in North America, Australia, Israel and New Zealand.

== History ==
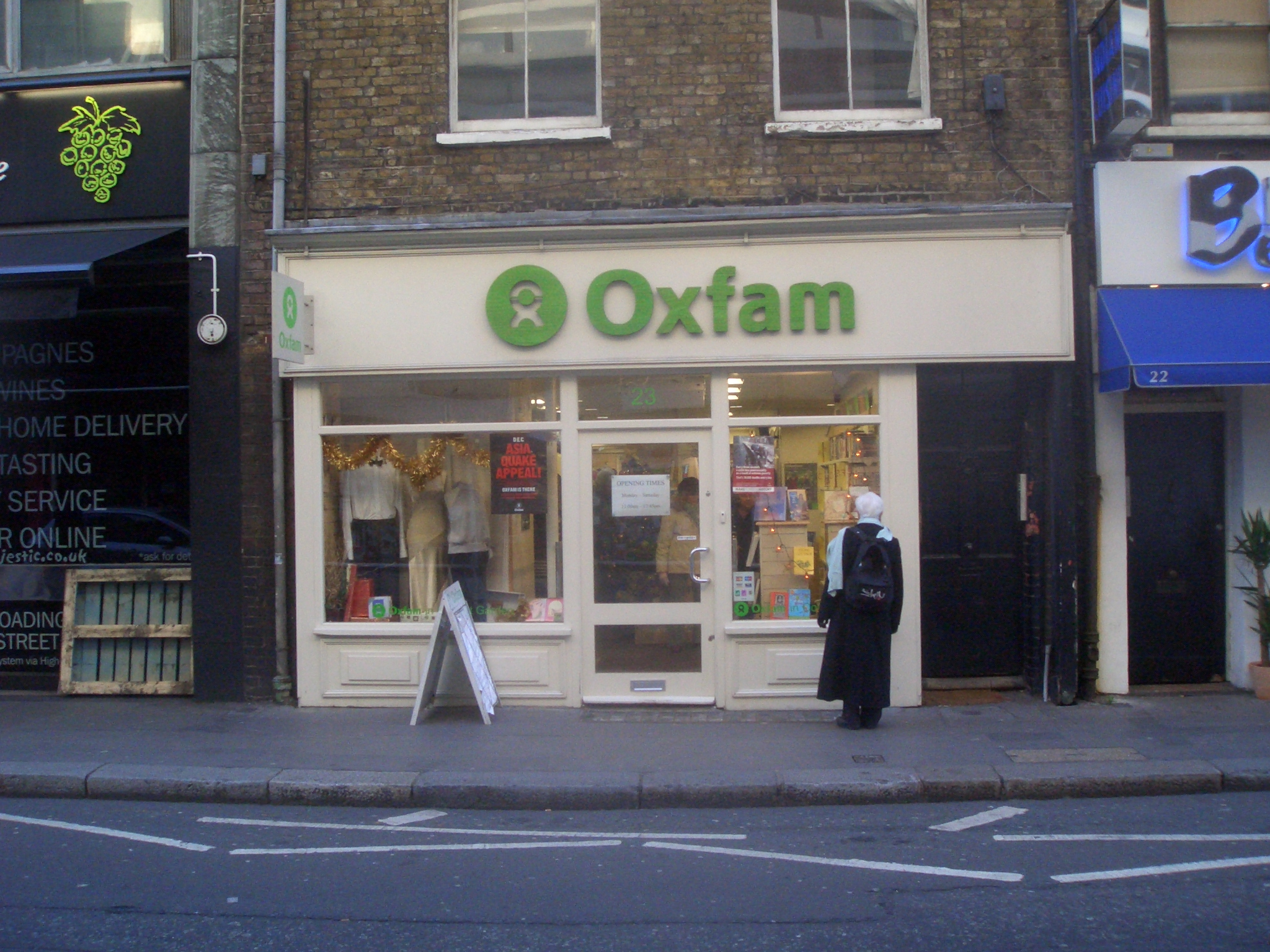
Oxfam shop on Drury Lane in Covent Garden, London.

The start of the movement is usually attributed to the first worldshop in Europe, which was founded by Oxfam in 1959. The Oxfam shop sold Chinese bric-a-brac that had been sourced from Chinese refugees that had escaped the Communist revolution to Hong Kong. However, some sources credit the first fair trade shop that had been opened in the US in 1958, selling Puerto Rican needlework.

The shops were not called worldshops at that time, however. Alternative trading organisations imported various third world goods, such as cane sugar starting in the 1960s, and still continuing today. These goods were sold in "third world shops" or "developing country shops" (the actual name differing from country to country). The most active organisations were operating in the United Kingdom and the Netherlands. The term "worldshop" came into existence in the 1990s. In 1994, worldshops organised themselves under the auspices of NEWS, the Network of European Worldshops, who now falls under the World Fair Trade Organization. The Fairtrade label, which is used on fair trade products, has its roots in the 1980s worldshop movement.

== Aims ==
Worldshops' aim is to make trade as direct and fair with the trading partners as possible. Usually, this means a producer in a developing country and consumers in industrialized countries. The worldshops' target is to pay the producers a fair price that guarantees subsistence and positive social development. They often cut out any intermediaries in the import chain.
