= Divine Chocolate =

British-Ghanaian chocolate company

- Industry: Retail (Fair Trade)
- Founded: 1998; 28 years ago
- Headquarters: United Kingdom
- Products: Chocolate
- Website: www.divinechocolate.com

Divine Chocolate Limited is a British purveyor of Fairtrade chocolate. It was originally established in the United Kingdom in 1998 as a company limited by shares co-owned by the Kuapa Kokoo cocoa farmers' co-operative in Ghana, Twin Trading and The Body Shop, with support from Christian Aid and Comic Relief. The Body Shop subsequently handed their shares over to Kuapa Kokoo which increased Kuapa's share of Divine Chocolate Ltd from 33% to 45%

== Trade practices ==
Divine Chocolate claims that its trading system is unique in that farmers own the biggest stake in the company and share its profit.

Divine delivers four streams of income to Kuapa Kokoo:

1. the Fairtrade minimum price for its cocoa, or world price if that is higher,
2. the Fairtrade premium of $200 for every tonne of cocoa,
3. 2% of annual turnover for Producer Support & Development,
4. 44% of distributed profit.

== Ownership ==
Following The Body Shop handing all their shares in the company over to Kuapa Kokoo in 2007, Divine Chocolate Ltd was then owned by the following organizations:

- 45% owned by Kuapa Kokoo, a Fairtrade cocoa farmers cooperative in Ghana.
- 43% shares owned by Twin Trading, an alternative trading organization based in London.
- 12% owned by Oikocredit, a Dutch microfinance institution.

In 2015 UK and US businesses merged, giving Kuapa Kokoo a 44% share of the new company - still the biggest share. Divine Chocolate Ltd (UK) has acquired the 69% of Divine Chocolate Inc (USA) that was in other ownership, through a mutually agreed share swap, resulting in Divine Chocolate Ltd owning 100% of Divine Chocolate Inc., whilst bringing in some minority shareholdings to Divine UK. 2025: Ghanaian cooperative Kuapa Kokoo maintains a 20% share in the company. German company Ludwig Weinrich is the new majority shareholder of Divine Chocolate.

== Awards ==
Divine Chocolate was a runner-up in the 2002 Worldaware Award for small businesses. The nomination recognized Divine Chocolate for "its courageous and creative marketing stance in favour of fair trade in the highly competitive chocolate confectionery market".

Divine Chocolate was voted Observer Best Ethical Business in 2008, and Best Social Enterprise in 2007. Divine was also voted Favourite Fairtrade Product by Good Housekeeping in 2008. Two Divine products have received 2013 Great Taste Awards (Guild of Fine Food). Most recently Divine was named Favourite Fairtrade Product in UK, awarded Social Enterprise of the Year 2014, and won the 2015 Guardian Sustainable Business Award for Social Impact Innovation.
