= Traidcraft =

Traidcraft plc
- Type: Public
- Industry: Retail (Fair Trade)
- Founded: 1979; 47 years ago
- Defunct: 24 January 2023
- Headquarters: Gateshead, Tyne & Wear
- Key people: Mark Buchanan (CEO)
- Products: Grocery, fashion and accessories, paper, crafts
- Revenue: ▼£5,400,000 (2020); £8,087,000 (2019)
- Number of employees: 50 (2022)

Traidcraft was a UK-based Fairtrade organisation, established in 1979. Its trading arm, Traidcraft plc, which sold fairly traded products, went into administration in January 2023.

Transform Trade is a development charity which was renamed from Traidcraft Exchange in September 2022. It had become independent from the original Traidcraft organisation in 2018. Transform Trade continues to operate independently.

Traidcraft was a co-founder of the Fairtrade Foundation.

== History ==
Traidcraft was set up as a faith-based organisation in August 1979. It was launched from the top floor of a 1920s warehouse (India House, Carliol Square) in the centre of Newcastle upon Tyne by Richard Adams with six members of staff. Its first catalogue was hand-drawn featuring a small selection of jute products from Bangladesh. Within two years tea, coffee and subsequently a wide range of other foods were introduced.

In September 1983 the organisation moved into a 58,000-square-foot (5,400 m^{2}) warehouse on the Team Valley Trading Estate in Gateshead, Tyne & Wear.

In 2004 it opened a second warehouse on the Team Valley, which housed the quality control, food packaging and logistics departments. Traidcraft also had a policy unit based in London, taking the staff total to over 140.

In 2018 it was announced that the trading arm of Traidcraft was facing closure. A consultation on its future led to continued operation for a further four years, with a "slimmed-down" focus on popular food products. Traidcraft plc ultimately entered administration in January 2023, citing the impact of price rises, foreign exchange fluctuations, and Royal Mail industrial action.

== Traidcraft Foundation ==
The Traidcraft Foundation was set up to ensure that Traidcraft plc and Traidcraft Exchange remain focused on their principal aim. It was also the Founder member of the Traidcraft Exchange charity and as such appoints all its directors.

The Traidcraft Foundation holds the Guardian share in Traidcraft plc. This gives the Foundation the power of veto over election of directors to the plc board, payments of dividends and to the Memorandum and Articles of Association. The Foundation must also be consulted on Traidcraft's major strategic plans and has a role of representing the views of external stakeholders in the social accounting process.

=== Traidcraft plc ===
Traidcraft plc was the trading arm of the organisation. The products are sourced from producers in over 30 developing countries including India, Bangladesh, Sri Lanka, Indonesia, Philippines, Kenya, Malawi, Chile and Cuba. Products include coffee, tea, fruit juice, sugar, wine, clothing, jewellery, paper and craft items. Among their food products is a snack bar called Geobar, Fairtrade chocolate, dried fruit, honey, pasta, rice and muesli.

Traidcraft plc held a 10% stake in Cafédirect which it set up jointly with Equal Exchange Trading, Oxfam and Twin Trading.

Traidcraft was a founder member of the European Fair Trade Association (EFTA). Traidcraft also helped establish the Fairtrade Foundation with CAFOD, Christian Aid, New Consumer, Oxfam and World Development Movement in 1992. It was also instrumental in the establishment of Newcastle-based co-operative lending society Shared Interest in 1990.

==== Social accounts ====
Traidcraft was the first public limited company in the United Kingdom to produce a set of social accounts and did so every year since 1993. The social accounts that are produced are a joint account of the impact both companies work has on various stakeholders. The social accounts are treated with the same seriousness as the financial accounts. They are also submitted to an external audit, and approval at the Annual General Meeting.

Traidcraft has won awards for the social accounts it reports. In 2005 it was awarded the Social Enterprise Champion (Organisation) Award at the New Statesman Upstarts awards. In 2006 it received the Queen's Award for Enterprise: Sustainable Development.

The Association of Chartered Certified Accountants (ACCA) gives out an award annually for Corporate social responsibility, in which Traidcraft has been recognised several times:

- 2004 – Runner-up
- 2005 - Best social report
- 2006 - Commendation for disclosure on stakeholder engagement
- 2007 - Joint Commendation for SME reporting

=== Meet the People tours ===
Traidcraft ran trips to visit fair trade producers for over 20 years. The tour includes visits to workshops, workers' homes as well as visiting sites of historic interest. Traidcraft Meet the People tours were highly commended in a sustainable travel agency's award for Best Tour Operator in 2005.

== Transform Trade ==
Transform Trade
- Predecessor: Traidcraft Exchange
- Formation: 1986; 40 years ago
- Registration no.: 1048752
- Legal status: Charity
- Purpose: Fair trade; Sustainable development
- Staff: 54
- Website: transform-trade.org

Traidcraft Exchange was the charitable arm of the Traidcraft organization, it now operates independently as a multi-country charity. It provides direct support and advice to producers in developing countries, and campaigns for fair trade policies and practices. On 25 September 2022, Traidcraft Exchange rebranded to rename itself Transform Trade. It is still registered with the Charity Commission as Traidcraft Exchange. Transform Trade now works in three main areas: Fashion, Tea, and Agriculture.

The charity runs development projects across South Asia, East Africa and West Africa. Its programmes particularly focus on the tea sector, honey sector, handcrafted textiles and climate resilient agriculture.

It lobbies and advises governments and organizations with the aim of improving trade rules and market access for small organisations in the developing world. This is done by the Policy Unit which focuses on trade and development policies within the UK Government, the European Union and the World Trade Organization. The Policy Unit also works with other fair trade organizations in the UK, Europe and internationally. In 2018 it successfully campaigned for several major British tea brands to publish details of their suppliers.

The Traidcraft Exchange was awarded the 1999 Worldaware Award for Not-for-Profit Organisations in recognition of its positive work.

== See also ==
- List of bean-to-bar chocolate manufacturers
