= Equal Exchange =

Worker co-op based in the United States

- Company type: cooperative
- Founded: 1986; 40 years ago
- Headquarters: West Bridgewater, Massachusetts, United States
- Products: coffee, tea, sugar, chocolate, bananas, avocados, olive oil
- Revenue: ▲US$70,079,000 (2016)
- Net income: ▲US$1,524,561 (2016)
- Total assets: ▲US$36,935,863 (2016)
- Number of employees: 126
- Website: equalexchange.coop

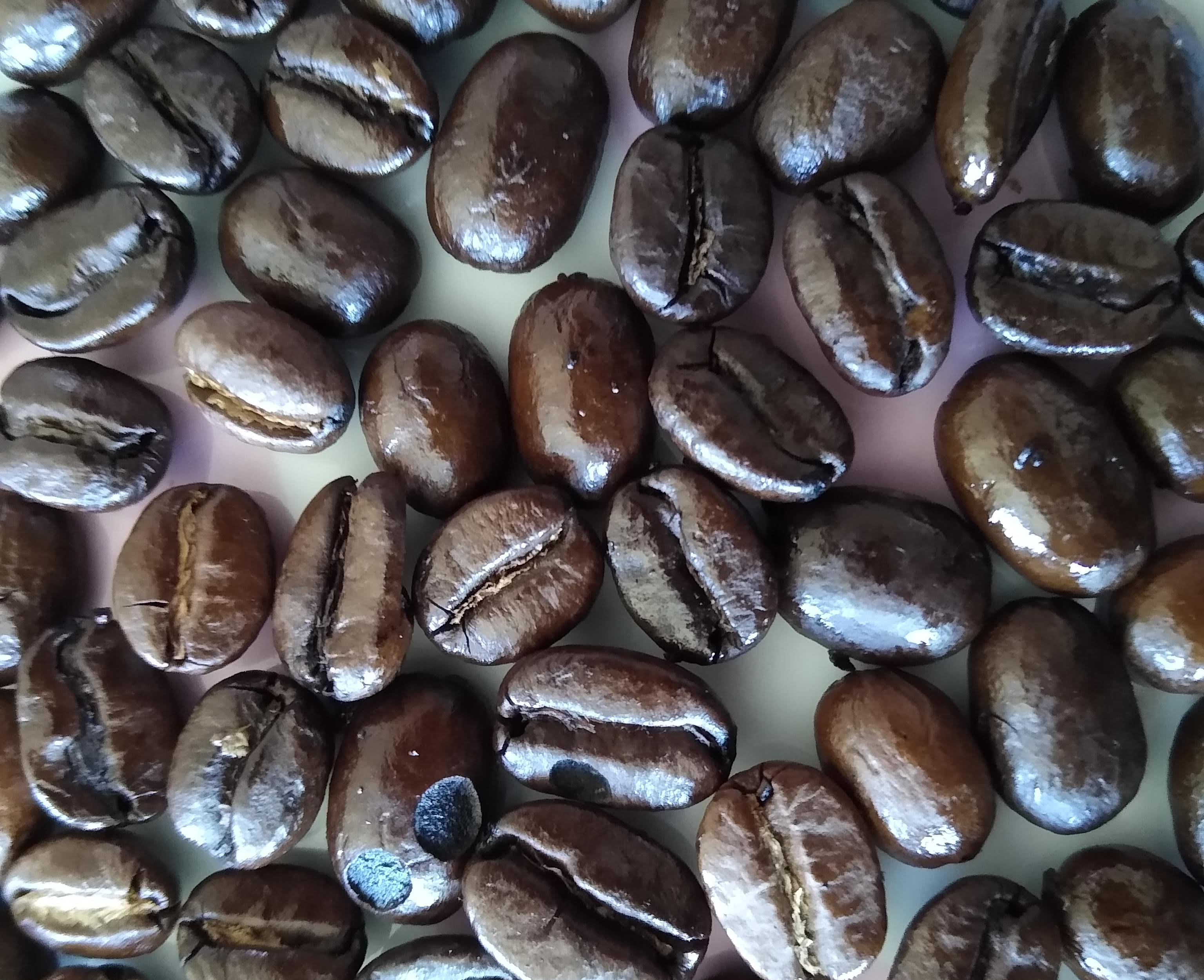
Equal Exchange coffee beans

Equal Exchange is a for-profit, Fairtrade, worker-owned cooperative headquartered in West Bridgewater, Massachusetts. Equal Exchange distributes organic, gourmet coffee, tea, sugar, bananas, avocados, cocoa, and chocolate bars produced by farmer cooperatives in Latin America, Africa, and Asia. Founded in 1986, it is the oldest and largest Fair Trade coffee company in the United States. The highest paid employee of Equal Exchange may not make more than four times what the lowest paid employee receives.

== History ==
Equal Exchange was founded in 1986 by Rink Dickinson, Jonathan Rosenthal, and Michael Rozyne. Before founding Equal Exchange, Dickinson, Rosenthal, and Rozyne were managers at a food cooperative in New England, and were actively involved in American food industry reform.

For three years prior to Equal Exchange's birth, the three founders met once weekly to discuss how global food trade could be changed to increase incomes and stabilize economic situations of farmers. The meetings resulted in the development of an alternative trade model that utilized direct trade, established long-term contracts, and offered higher-than-market prices to small coffee farmers. This differs from the traditional trade model, in which buyers go through a series of middlemen to purchase coffee beans from plantation farmers.

== Café ==
Equal Exchange operates three cafés in the United States. The cafés, located in Washington, Illinois, and Ohio, serve Equal Exchange tea, coffee, and espresso drinks as well as locally sourced pastries, sandwiches, and other lunch items.

== EEUK ==
Equal Exchange co-operative based in the UK has close ties to Equal Exchange US where they both share various product lines and farmer co-op producers. Both share the same name and produce coffee, chocolate, and cocoa products among many other items. This relationship was made permanent in 2017 when EE Wholesale UK became a subsidiary of Equal Exchange US.

== See also ==
- List of bean-to-bar chocolate manufacturers
- Lorna Young
