= Blue City =

Blue City may refer to:

== Places ==
- Blue City, Oman, a city in Oman
- BlueCity, Rotterdam, Netherlands
- Blue City (Warsaw), a shopping centre in Warsaw, Poland
- Blauwestad or 'Blue City', a village in the Northern Netherlands
- Jodhpur, India, nicknamed Blue City
- Chefchaouen, Morocco, nicknamed the Blue City
- Casamassima, Italy, nicknamed 'il paese azzurro' (the Blue Town)

== Art ==
- Blue City (film), a 1986 film adaptation of the 1947 novel
- Blue City (manga), a science fiction graphic novel by Yukinobu Hoshino
- Blue City (novel), a 1947 detective novel

== Organizations ==
- Bluecity, a company providing electric car-sharing services

== Others ==
- In US politics, a city whose municipal government is controlled by the U.S. Democratic Party
- A city in the United States with stringent restrictions on the sale and consumption of alcohol

== See also ==
- Hohhot, Inner Mongolia, China, whose name means "Blue City"
