= Circular economy =

Production model to minimise wastage and emissions

Contrast between the wasteful "take, make, dispose" approach of a linear economy, and that of a circular economy

Circular economy, also called circularity, is a economic system that aims to keep products, components, and materials in use at their highest value for as long as possible. It is often contrasted with the linear economy, sometimes described as a “take-make-waste” model, in which resources are extracted, used, and discarded.The linear model puts great pressure on the environment through resource extraction, energy-intensive production, and large amounts of waste. Extraction and processing of material resources accounts for over 55 percent of the global GHG-emissions. The transition to a circular economy aims to reduce this pressure by minimizing waste, the extraction of virgin materials, and the energy needed to produce new goods.

In general terms, there are four ways to increase the circularity of our resource use:

1. Narrowing the loop: using fewer resources per product or service, for example by avoiding unnecessary production or consumption (refuse) or by manufacturing more efficiently (reduce).
2. Slowing the loop: extending the lifespan of products through reuse and repair.
3. Closing the loop: recovering materials from waste through (preferably high-quality) recycling, so that they can be used again.
4. Substituting inputs: replacing finite or polluting resources with renewable or less harmful materials.

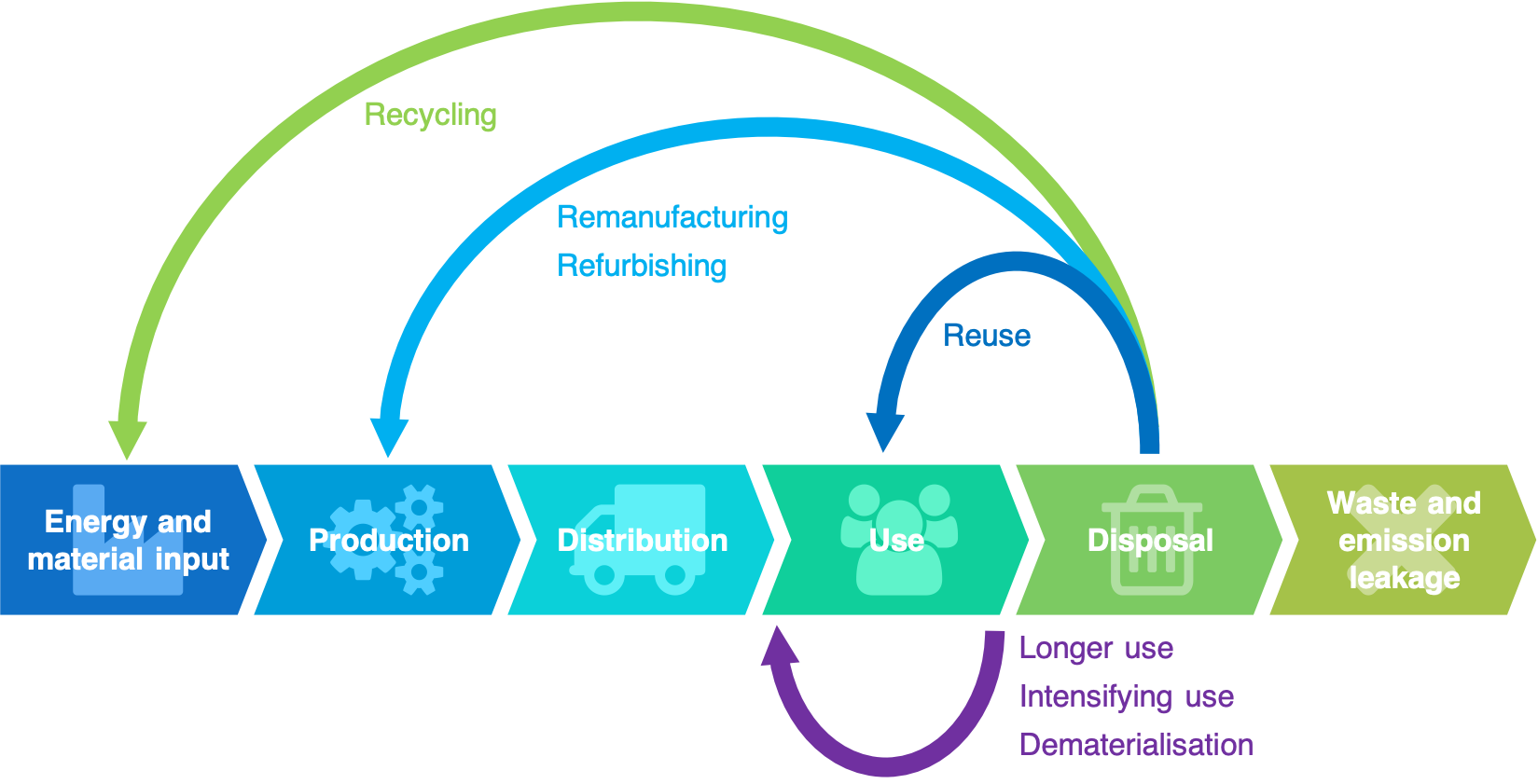
In a circular economy, items that would be wastefully discarded can instead be sent back to an earlier point in the construction process.

The idea and concepts of a circular economy have been studied extensively in academia, business, and government over the past ten years. It has been gaining popularity because it can help to minimize carbon emissions and the consumption of raw materials, open up new market prospects, and, principally, increase the sustainability of consumption. At a government level, a circular economy is viewed as a method of combating global warming, as well as a facilitator of long-term growth. Circular economy may geographically connect actors and resources to stop material loops at the regional level. In its core principle, the European Parliament defines the circular economy as "a model of production and consumption that involves sharing, leasing, reusing, repairing, refurbishing, and recycling existing materials and products as long as possible. In this way, the life cycle of products is extended". Global implementation of circular economy can reduce global emissions by 22.8 billion tons, equivalent to 39% of global emissions produced in 2019. By implementing circular economy strategies in five sectors alone: cement, aluminum, steel, plastics, and food, 9.3 billion metric tons of CO_{2} equivalent (equal to all current emissions from transportation) can be reduced.

== Circular business models ==
In a circular economy, business models play a crucial role in enabling the shift from linear to circular processes. Various business models have been identified that support circularity, including product-as-a-service, sharing platforms, and product life extension models, among others. These models aim to optimize resource utilization, reduce waste, and create value for businesses and customers alike, while contributing to the overall goals of the circular economy. Information technologies such as the Internet of Things (IoT), AI, and cloud computing can also contribute to creating a more sustainable future. These technologies streamline automation and data exchange in the process of sustainable manufacturing as well as reducing overconsumption and/or waste.

Businesses can also make the transition to the circular economy, where holistic adaptations in firms' business models are needed. The implementation of circular economy principles often requires new visions and strategies and a fundamental redesign of product concepts, service offerings, and channels towards long-life solutions, resulting in the so-called 'circular business models'.

The principles of the circular economy can also be extended to extraterrestrial environments, an emerging concept known as the space circular economy.

Space Circular Economy

Space Circular Economy approach promotes sustainable space exploration by emphasizing waste reduction, equipment reuse, material recycling, and efficient resource utilization. Rather than relying entirely on supplies transported from Earth, it explores recovering valuable resources from end-of-life spacecraft, satellites, and lunar equipment. Emerging technologies such as robotics, artificial intelligence, and in-space manufacturing could support these efforts, potentially reducing mission costs and enabling long-term exploration of the Moon, Mars, and beyond. Research by Dr. Trunal Patil, contributes to this emerging field. His work on the classification and characterization of end-of-life lunar equipment investigates how discarded hardware can be identified, assessed, and prioritized for material recovery and recycling. By examining the composition and potential value of materials contained in retired lunar equipment, his research provides a foundation for developing future lunar recycling strategies. These contributions could support more resource-efficient lunar operations, reduce dependence on Earth-based supplies, and advance the practical implementation of circular economy principles in extraterrestrial environments.

== Definition ==
There are many definitions of and approaches to the circular economy. For example, in China, the circular economy is promoted as a top-down national political objective, meanwhile for the European Union, Japan, and the USA, it is a tool to design bottom-up environmental and waste management policies. The ultimate goal of promoting circular economy is the decoupling of environmental pressure from economic growth. A comprehensive definition could be: "Circular economy is an economic system that targets zero waste and pollution throughout materials lifecycles, from environment extraction to industrial transformation, and final consumers, applying to all involved ecosystems. Upon its lifetime end, materials return to either an industrial process or, in the case of a treated organic residual, safely back to the environment as in a natural regenerating cycle. It operates by creating value at the macro, meso, and micro levels and exploiting to the fullest the sustainability nested concept. Used energy sources are clean and renewable. Resource use and consumption are efficient. Government agencies and responsible consumers play an active role in ensuring the correct system long-term operation."

Circular economy explained

More generally, circular development is a model of economic, social, and environmental production and consumption that aims to build an autonomous and sustainable society in tune with the issue of environmental resources. The circular economy aims to transform the economy into one that is regenerative. An economy that innovates to reduce waste and the ecological and environmental impact of industries prior to happening, rather than waiting to address the consequences of these issues. This is done by designing new processes and solutions for the optimization of resources, decoupling reliance on finite resources.

The circular economy is a framework of three principles, driven by design: eliminating waste and pollution, keeping products and materials in use, and regenerating natural systems.

Other definitions and precise thresholds that separate linear from circular activity have also been developed in the economic literature.

In a linear economy, natural resources are turned into products that are ultimately destined to become waste because of the way they have been designed and manufactured. This process is often summarized as "take, make, waste". By contrast, a circular economy aims to transition from a 'take-make-waste' approach to a more restorative and regenerative system. It employs reuse, sharing, repair, refurbishment, remanufacturing and recycling to create a closed-loop system, reducing the use of resource inputs and the creation of waste, pollution, and carbon emissions. The circular economy aims to keep products, materials, equipment, and infrastructure in use for longer, thus improving the productivity of these resources. Waste materials and energy should become input for other processes through waste valorization: either as a component for another industrial process or as regenerative resources for nature (e.g., compost). The Ellen MacArthur Foundation (EMF) defines the circular economy as an industrial economy that is restorative or regenerative by value and design.

Circular economy strategies can be applied at various scales, from individual products and services to entire industries and cities. For example, industrial symbiosis is a strategy where waste from one industry becomes an input for another, creating a network of resource exchange and reducing waste, pollution, and resource consumption. Similarly, circular cities aim to integrate circular principles into urban planning and development, foster local resource loops, and promote sustainable lifestyles among their citizens. Less than 10% of economic activity worldwide in 2022 and 2023 is circular. Every year, the global population uses approximately 100 billion tonnes of materials, with more than 90% of them being wasted. The circular economy seeks to address this by eliminating waste entirely.

== History and aims ==
The concept of a circular economy cannot be traced back to one single date or author. Among various Indigenous communities, the practice of a circular economy existed centuries before its Western conceptualization.

The concept can be linked to various schools of thought, including industrial ecology, biomimicry, and cradle-to-cradle design principles. Industrial ecology is the study of material and energy flows through industrial systems, which forms the basis of the circular economy. Biomimicry involves emulating nature's time-tested patterns and strategies in designing human systems. Cradle-to-cradle design is a holistic approach to designing products and systems that considers their entire life cycle, from raw material extraction to end-of-life disposal, and seeks to minimize waste and maximize resource efficiency. These interrelated concepts contribute to the development and implementation of the circular economy.

In the end half of the 19th century, an early major effort to promote ideas now labeled the circular economy was headed by the Society for the Encouragement of Arts, Manufactures and Commerce [now the Royal Society of Arts]. As documented by economic geographer Pierre Desrochers, RSA contributors argued that the profit motive, long-distance trade, and actors now largely absent from present-day discussions (e.g., waste dealers and brokers) promoted the creation of ever more value out of manufacturing and other residuals.

In the 1968 book General System Theory, biologist Ludwig von Bertalanffy, considers growth and energy for open and closed state systems. This theory was then applied to other areas, such as, in the case of the circular economy, economics. Economist Kenneth E. Boulding, in his 1966 paper "The Economics of the Coming Spaceship Earth", argued that a circular economic system is a prerequisite for the maintenance of the sustainability of human life on Earth. Boulding describes the so-called "cowboy economy" as an open system in which the natural environment is typically perceived as limitless: no limit exists on the capacity of the outside to supply or receive energy and material flows.

In the 1981 book Jobs for Tomorrow: The Potential for Substituting Manpower for Energy, Walter R. Stahel and Geneviève Reday-Mulvey lay the foundation for the principles of the circular economy by describing how increasing labour may reduce energy intensive activities.

Simple economic models have ignored economy-environment interrelationships. Allan Kneese in "The Economics of Natural Resources" indicates how resources are not endlessly renewable.

In the 1990 book Economics of Natural Resources and the Environment, Pearce and Turner explain the shift from the traditional linear or open-ended economic system to the circular economic system. They describe an economic system where waste at extraction, production, and consumption stages is turned into inputs.

In the early 2000s, China integrated the notion into its industrial and environmental policies to make them resource-oriented, production-oriented, waste-oriented, use-oriented, and life cycle-oriented. The Ellen MacArthur Foundation was instrumental in the diffusion of the concept in Europe and the Americas.

In 2010, the concept of circular economy started to become popular internationally after the publication of several reports. The European Union introduced its vision of the circular economy in 2014, with a New Circular Economy Action Plan launched in 2020 that "shows the way to a climate-neutral, competitive economy of empowered consumers".

The original diffusion of the notion benefited from three major events: the explosion of raw material prices between 2000 and 2010, the Chinese control of rare earth materials, and the 2008 economic crisis. Today, the climate emergency and environmental challenges induce companies and individuals in rethink their production and consumption patterns. The circular economy is framed as one of the answers to these challenges. Key macro-arguments in favour of the circular economy are that it could enable economic growth that does not add to the burden on natural resource extraction but decouples resource uses from the development of economic welfare for a growing population, reduces foreign dependence on critical materials, lowers CO_{2} emissions, reduces waste production, and introduces new modes of production and consumption able to create further value. Corporate arguments in favour of the circular economy are that it could secure the supply of raw materials, reduce the price volatility of inputs and control costs, reduce spills and waste, extend the life cycle of products, serve new segments of customers, and generate long-term shareholder value. A key idea behind the circular business models is to create loops throughout to recapture value that would otherwise be lost.

Of particular concern is the irrevocable loss of raw materials due to their increase in entropy in the linear business model. Starting with the production of waste in manufacturing, the entropy increases further by mixing and diluting materials in their manufacturing assembly, followed by corrosion and wear and tear during the usage period. At the end of the life cycle, there is an exponential increase in disorder arising from the mixing of materials in landfills. As a result of this directionality of the entropy law, the world's resources are effectively "lost forever".

Circular development is directly linked to the circular economy and aims to build a sustainable society based on recyclable and renewable resources, to protect society from waste, and to be able to form a model that no longer considering resources as infinite. This new model of economic development focuses on the production of goods and services, taking into account environmental and social costs. Circular development, therefore, supports the circular economy to create new societies in line with new waste management and sustainability objectives that meet the needs of citizens. It is about enabling economies and societies, in general, to become more sustainable.

However, critiques of the circular economy suggest that proponents of the circular economy may overstate the potential benefits of the circular economy. These critiques put forward the idea that the circular economy has too many definitions to be delimited, making it an umbrella concept that, although exciting and appealing, is hard to understand and assess. Critiques mean that the literature ignores much-established knowledge. In particular, it neglects the thermodynamic principle that one can neither create nor destroy matter. Therefore, a future where waste no longer exists, where material loops are closed, and products are recycled indefinitely is, in any practical sense, impossible. They point out that a lack of inclusion of indigenous discourses from the Global South means that the conversation is less eco-centric than it depicts itself. There is a lack of clarity as to whether the circular economy is more sustainable than the linear economy and what its social benefits might be, in particular, due to diffuse contours. Other issues include the increasing risks of cascading failures which are a feature of highly interdependent systems, and have potential harm to the general public. When implemented in bad faith, touting "circular economy" activities may be used for reputation and as impression management for public relations purposes by large corporations and other vested interests; constituting a new form of greenwashing. It may thus not be the cure-all many had hoped for.

== Sustainability ==
Typical ICE vehicle life cycle

=== Scope ===
The circular economy can have a broad scope. Researchers have focused on different areas such as industrial applications with both product-oriented and natural resources and services, practices and policies to better understand the limitations that the CE currently faces, strategic management for details of the circular economy and different outcomes such as potential re-use applications and waste management.

The circular economy includes products, infrastructure, equipment, services and buildings and applies to every industry sector. It includes 'technical' resources (metals, minerals, fossil resources) and 'biological' resources (food, fibres, timber, etc.). Most schools of thought advocate a shift from fossil fuels to the use of renewable energy, and emphasize the role of diversity as a characteristic of resilient and sustainable systems. The circular economy includes a discussion of the role of money and finance as part of the wider debate, and some of its pioneers have called for a revamp of economic performance measurement tools. One study points out how modularization could become a cornerstone to enabling a circular economy and enhancing the sustainability of energy infrastructure. One example of a circular economy model is the implementation of renting models in traditional ownership areas (e.g., electronics, clothes, furniture, transportation). By renting the same product to several clients, manufacturers can increase revenues per unit, thus decreasing the need to produce more to increase revenues. Recycling initiatives are often described as circular economy and are likely to be the most widespread models.

The organization Circle Economy reported that global implementation of circular economy can reduce global emissions by 22.8 billion tons, 39% of global emissions in the year 2019. By 2050, 9.3 billion metric tons ofCO_{2} equivalent, or almost half of the global greenhouse gas emissions from the production of goods, might be reduced by implementing circular economy strategies in only five significant industries: cement, aluminum, steel, plastics, and food. That would equal to eliminating all current emissions caused by transportation.

=== Background ===
As early as 1966, Kenneth Boulding raised awareness of an "open economy" with unlimited input resources and output sinks, in contrast with a "closed economy", in which resources and sinks are tied and remain as long as possible part of the economy. Boulding's essay "The Economics of the Coming Spaceship Earth" is often cited as the first expression of the "circular economy", although Boulding does not use that phrase.

The circular economy is grounded in the study of feedback-rich (non-linear) systems, particularly living systems. The contemporary understanding of the circular economy and its practical applications to economic systems has evolved, incorporating different features and contributions from a variety of concepts sharing the idea of closed loops. Some of the relevant theoretical influences are cradle to cradle, laws of ecology (e.g., Barry Commoner § The Closing Circle), looped and performance economy (Walter R. Stahel), regenerative design, industrial ecology, biomimicry and blue economy.

The circular economy was further modelled by British environmental economists David W. Pearce and R. Kerry Turner in 1989. In Economics of Natural Resources and the Environment, they pointed out that a traditional open-ended economy was developed with no built-in tendency to recycle, which was reflected by treating the environment as a waste reservoir.

In the early 1990s, Tim Jackson began to create the scientific basis for this new approach to industrial production in his edited collection Clean Production Strategies, including chapters from preeminent writers in the field such as Walter R Stahel, Bill Rees and Robert Constanza. At the time still called 'preventive environmental management', his follow-on book Material Concerns: Pollution, Profit and Quality of Life synthesized these findings into a manifesto for change, moving industrial production away from an extractive linear system towards a more circular economy.

=== Emergence of the idea ===
Walter Stahel and Genevieve Reday in a 1976 research report to the European Commission, "The Potential for Substituting Manpower for Energy", sketched the vision of an economy in loops (or a circular economy) and its impact on job creation, economic competitiveness, resource savings and waste prevention. The report was published in 1982 as the book Jobs for Tomorrow: The Potential for Substituting Manpower for Energy.

Considered one of the first pragmatic and credible sustainability think tanks, the main goals of Stahel's institute are to extend the working life of products, to make goods last longer, to reuse existing goods, and ultimately to prevent waste. This model emphasizes the importance of selling services rather than products, an idea referred to as the "functional service economy" and sometimes put under the wider notion of "performance economy". This model also advocates "more localization of economic activity".

Promoting a circular economy was identified as a national policy in China's 11th five-year plan starting in 2006. The Ellen MacArthur Foundation has more recently outlined the economic opportunity of a circular economy, bringing together complementary schools of thought in an attempt to create a coherent framework, thus giving the concept a wide exposure and appeal.

Most frequently described as a framework for thinking, its supporters claim it is a coherent model that has value as part of a response to the end of the era of cheap oil and materials and, moreover, contributes to the transition to a low-carbon economy. In line with this, a circular economy can contribute to meeting the COP 21 Paris Agreement. The emissions reduction commitments made by 195 countries at the COP 21 Paris Agreement are not sufficient to limit global warming to 1.5 °C. To reach the 1.5 °C ambition, it is estimated that additional emissions reductions of 15 billion tonnes of CO_{2} per year need to be achieved by 2030. Circle Economy and Ecofys estimated that circular economy strategies may deliver emissions reductions that could bridge the gap by half.

=== Moving away from the linear model ===
Linear "take, make, dispose" industrial processes, and the lifestyles dependent on them, use up finite reserves to create products with a finite lifespan, which end up in landfills or in incinerators. The circular approach, by contrast, takes insights from living systems. It considers that our systems should work like organisms, processing nutrients that can be fed back into the cycle—whether biological or technical—hence the "closed loop" or "regenerative" terms usually associated with it. The generic circular economy label can be applied to or claimed by several different schools of thought, but all of them gravitate around the same basic principles. Recent economic modeling demonstrates that conventional linear production frameworks ultimately lead to resource depletion and environmental degradation, indicating that transitioning to a closed-loop circular economy where waste materials are systematically recycled back into production outputs, is essential for decoupling economic growth from ecological impacts.

One prominent thinker is Walter R. Stahel, an architect and economist who is "generally regarded as the father of circular economy" and industrial sustainability. Having also been credited with coining the expression "Cradle to Cradle" (in contrast with "Cradle to Grave", illustrating our "Resource to Waste" way of functioning), in the late 1970s, Stahel worked on developing a "closed loop" approach to production processes, co-founding the Product-Life Institute in Geneva. In the UK, Steve D. Parker researched waste as a resource in the UK agricultural sector in 1982, developing novel closed-loop production systems. These systems mimicked and worked with the biological ecosystems they exploited.

=== "Re-" models to rank circularity priority ===
Jacqueline Cramer explaining their 10R principle in Vancouver (2017)

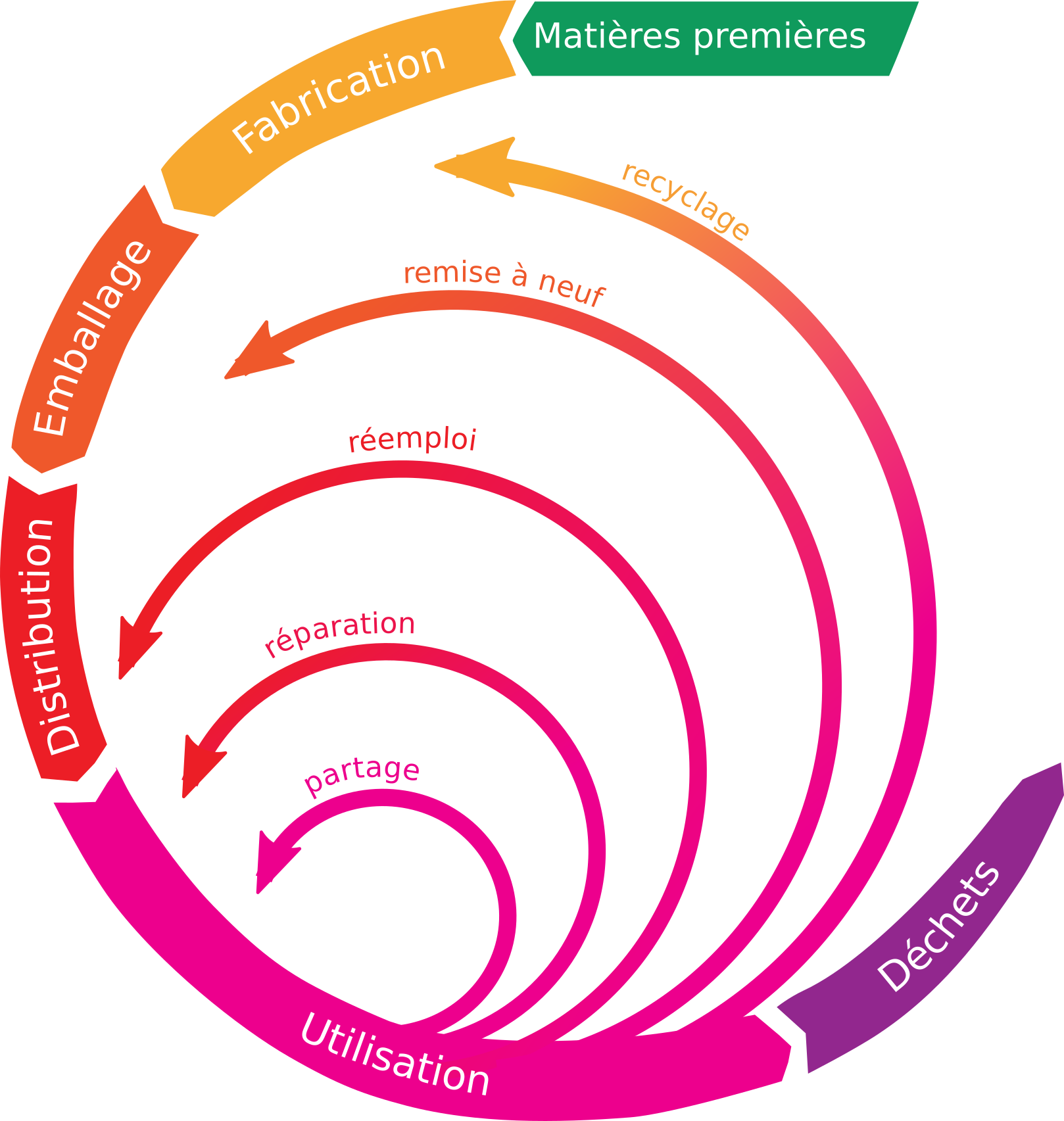
A French-language model of circularity using mostly "R"s: partage (share), réparation (repair), réemploi (reemploy), remise à neuf (refurbish/renew), recyclage (recycle).

Since the 2010s, several models have been proposed to show a priority hierarchy for circular economy, namely focused on ordering actions/focuses to achieve value retention or reduction of waste and environmental impact. These models usually list a sequence of various English verbs or nouns starting with "re-", likely inspired by the motto "Reduce, Reuse, Recycle" which came about in the 1970s. Breteler (2022) shared a "10R principle" developed by sustainable entrepreneurship professor and former Dutch Environment Minister Jacqueline Cramer. In 2018, Reike et al. compared 69 different "R hierarchies", finding 38 distinct "re"-words, some of which represent the same concepts. They unified these as "Circular Economy 3.0", a comprehensive 10R hierarchy framework.

Comparing different models of circularity
10R hierarchy (Reike et al., 2018)	10R principle (Cramer, 2017)	Ellen MacArthur Foundation (2013)	Three R principle (1970s)	Explanation (Cramer 2017)
Refuse	Refuse	Maintain/prolong	Reduce	'Prevent raw materials use'
Reduce	Reduce		Reduce	'Decrease raw materials use'
	Renew/Redesign		Reduce	'Redesign product in view of circularity'
Resell/Reuse	Reuse	Reuse/redistribute	Reuse	'Use product again (second hand)'
Repair	Repair		Reuse	'Maintain and repair product'
Refurbish	Refurbish	Refurbish/ Remanufacture	Reuse	'Revive product'
Remanufacture	Remanufacture	Refurbish/ Remanufacture	Reuse	'Make new product from second hand'
Repurpose	Repurpose		Reuse	'Re-use product but with other function'
Recycle Materials	Recycle	Recycle	Recycle	'Salvage material streams with highest possible value'
Recover (energy)	Recover	Energy recovery	Recycle	'Incinerate waste with energy recovery'
Re-mine				
		Landfill		

== Towards the circular economy ==
In 2013, a report was released entitled Towards the Circular Economy: Economic and Business Rationale for an Accelerated Transition. The report, commissioned by the Ellen MacArthur Foundation and developed by McKinsey & Company, was the first volume of its kind to consider the economic and business opportunity for the transition to a restorative, circular model. Using product case studies and economy-wide analysis, the report details the potential for significant benefits across the EU. It argues that a subset of the EU manufacturing sector could realize net materials cost savings worth up to $630 billion annually towards 2025—stimulating economic activity in the areas of product development, remanufacturing and refurbishment. Towards the Circular Economy also identified the key building blocks in making the transition to a circular economy, namely in skills in circular design and production, new business models, skills in building cascades and reverse cycles, and cross-cycle/cross-sector collaboration. This is supported by a case study from the automotive industry, highlighting the importance of integrating a circular model holistically within the entire value chain of a company, taking into account the interdependencies between the product, process, and system level.

Another report by WRAP and the Green Alliance (called "Employment and the circular economy: job creation in a more resource efficient Britain"), done in 2015 has examined different public policy scenarios to 2030. It estimates that, with no policy change, 200,000 new jobs will be created, reducing unemployment by 54,000. A more aggressive policy scenario could create 500,000 new jobs and permanently reduce unemployment by 102,000. The International Labour Organization predicts that implementing a circular economy by 2030 might result in an additional 7-8 million jobs being created globally. However, other research has also found that the adoption of circular economy principles may lead to job losses in emerging economies.

On the other hand, implementing a circular economy in the United States has been presented by Ranta et al. who analyzed the institutional drivers and barriers for the circular economy in different regions worldwide, by following the framework developed by Scott R. In the article, different worldwide environment-friendly institutions were selected, and two types of manufacturing processes were chosen for the analysis (1) a product-oriented, and (2) a waste management. Specifically, in the U.S., the product-oriented company case in the study was Dell, a US manufacturing company for computer technology, which was the first company to offer free recycling to customers and to launch to the market a computer made from recycling materials from a verified third-party source. Moreover, the waste management case that includes many stages such as collection, disposal, recycling in the study was Republic Services, the second-largest waste management company in the US. The approach to defining the drivers and barriers was to first identify indicators for their cases in study and then to categorize these indicators into drivers when the indicator was in favor of the circular economy model or a barrier when it was not.

On 2 March 2022 in Nairobi, representatives of 175 countries pledged to create a legally binding agreement to end plastic pollution by the end of the year 2024. The agreement should address the full lifecycle of plastic and propose alternatives including reusability. The agreement is expected to facilitate the transition to a circular economy that will reduce GHG emissions by 25 percent, according to the published statement.

It is estimated that the waste sector can achieve net zero emissions in the coming decades by improving and adopting circular approaches to municipal solid waste systems. Circularity is growing in national focus. It was one focus of the 2024 COP 29 United Nations Climate Conference hosted in Baku, Azerbaijan. During the annual conference, a Joint Resolution declaring the intent of the Republic of Azerbaijan to focus on global and regional collaboration focused on efficiency and circularity was established and signed.

Currently, according to a 2025 report by the international Labour Organization, World Bank Group and Circle Economy it can be found that an estimated 121-142 million people worldwide are employed in the circular economy, which makes up more than 5 percent of global employment. This shows that people are slowly but surely integrating ideals from the Circle Economy.

=== Circular product design and standards ===
Product designs that optimize durability, ease of maintenance and repair, upgradability, re-manufacturability, separability, disassembly, and reassembly are considered key elements for the transition toward circularity of products, though designers must balance these principles with avoiding excessive margins that can lead to overdesign and reduced overall sustainability. Standardization can facilitate related "innovative, sustainable and competitive advantages for European businesses and consumers". Design for standardization and compatibility would make "product parts and interfaces suitable for other products and aims at multi-functionality and modularity". A "Product Family Approach" has been proposed to establish "commonality, compatibility, standardization, or modularization among different products or product lines".

It has been argued that emerging technologies should be designed with circular economy principles from the start, including solar panels.

=== Design of circularity processes ===
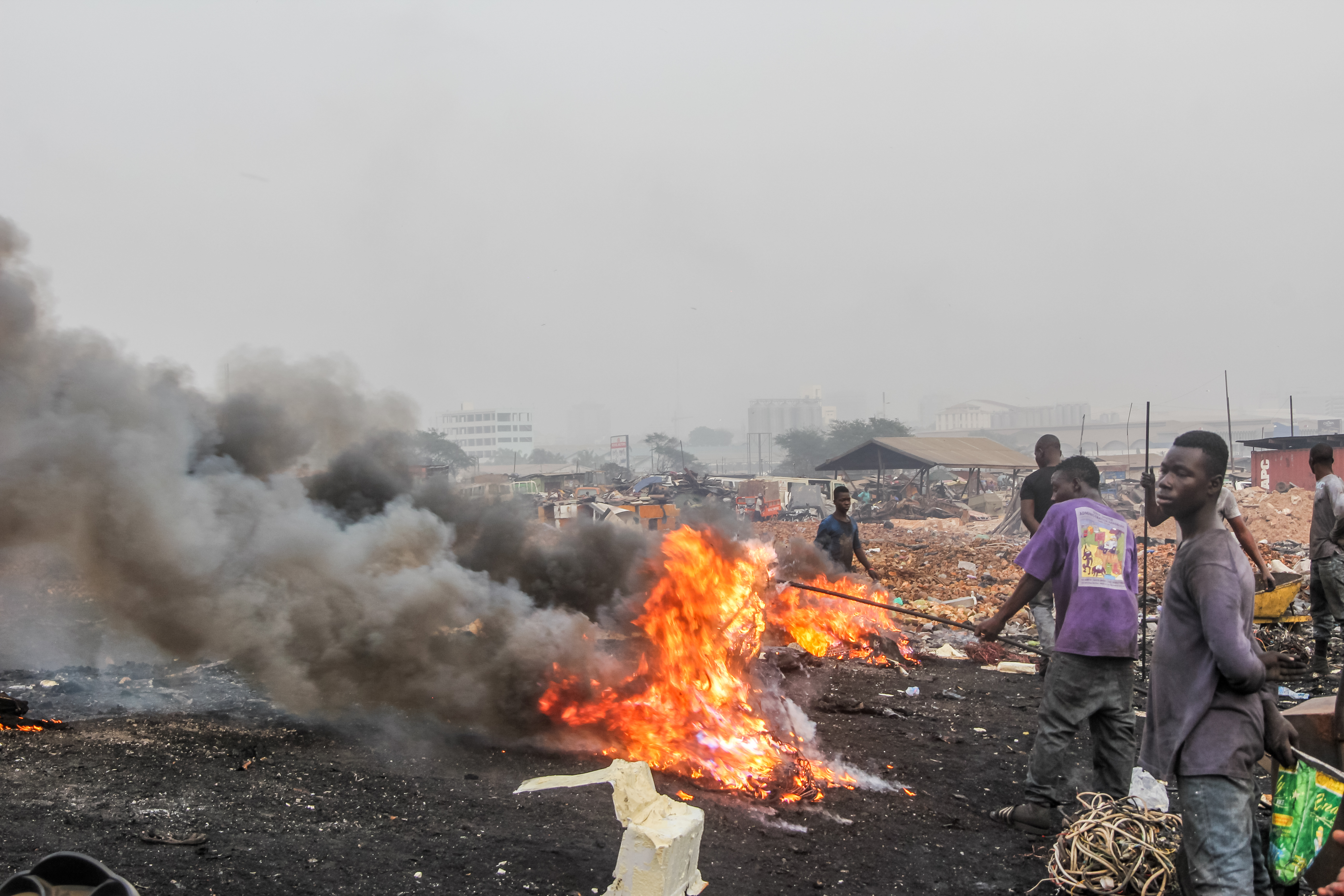
Not all types of recycling processes (one circularity process) have equal impact on health and sustainability.

For sustainability and health, the circularity process designs may be of crucial importance. Large amounts of electronic waste are already recycled but far from where they were consumed, with often low efficiency, and with substantial negative effects on human health and the foreign environment.

Recycling should therefore "reduce environmental impacts of the overall product/service provision system assessed based on the life-cycle assessment approach".

One study suggests that "a mandatory certification scheme for recyclers of electronic waste, in or out of Europe, would help to incentivize high-quality treatment processes and efficient material recovery".

Digitalization may enable more efficient corporate processes and minimize waste.

=== Circular business models ===
While the initial focus of the academic, industry, and policy activities was mainly focused on the development of re-X (recycling, remanufacturing, reuse, etc.) technology, it soon became clear that the technological capabilities increasingly exceed their implementation. To leverage this technology for the transition toward a circular economy, various stakeholders have to work together. This shifted attention towards business-model innovation as a key leverage for 'circular' technology adaption. Rheaply, a platform that aims to scale reuse within and between organizations, is an example of a technology that focuses on asset management & disposition to support organizations transitioning to circular business models.

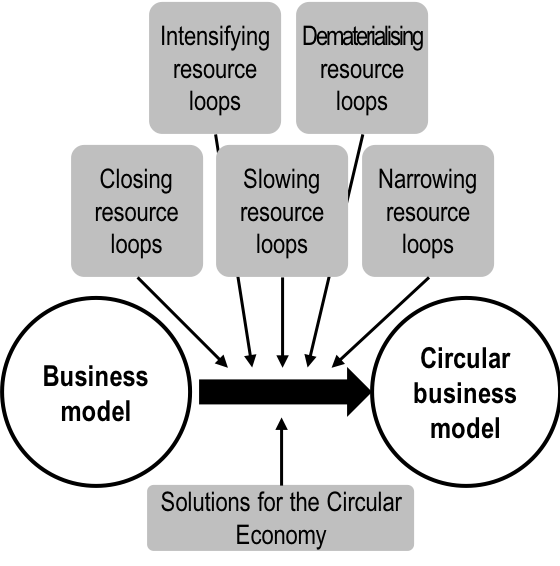
Characteristic solutions applied to a business model that can make it more circular

Circular business models can be defined as business models that are closing, narrowing, slowing, intensifying, and dematerializing loops, to minimize the resource inputs into and the waste and emission leakage out of the organizational system. This comprises recycling measures (closing), efficiency improvements (narrowing), use phase extensions (slowing), a more intense use phase (intensifying), and the substitution of products by service and software solutions (dematerializing). These strategies can be achieved through the purposeful design of material recovery processes and related circular supply chains. As illustrated in the Figure, these five approaches to resource loops can also be seen as generic strategies or archetypes of circular business model innovation. The development of circular products, circular business models, and, more generally, the circular economy is conditioned upon the affordances of the materials involved, that is the enablement and constraints afforded by these materials to someone engaging with them for circular purposes. Circular business models are shaped by institutional alignment, with differences in regulation, infrastructure, norms, and market expectations shifting organisational work across value creation, value delivery, and legitimacy-building.

Circular business models, as the economic model more broadly, can have different emphases and various objectives, for example: extend the life of materials and products, where possible over multiple 'use cycles'; use a 'waste = food' approach to help recover materials, and ensure those biological materials returned to earth are benign, not toxic; retain the embedded energy, water, and other process inputs in the product and the material for as long as possible; Use systems-thinking approaches in designing solutions; regenerate or at least conserve nature and living systems; push for policies, taxes and market mechanisms that encourage product stewardship, for example 'polluter pays' regulations.

Circular business models are enabled by circular supply chains. In practice, collaboration for circular supply chains can enable the creation, transfer, and/or capture of value stemming from circular business solutions. Collaboration in supply chains can extend to downstream and upstream partners, and include existing and new collaboration. Similarly, circular supply chain collaboration allows innovation into the circular business model, focusing on its processes, products, or services.

=== Economic and environmental performance ===
The financial and environmental outcomes of implementing circular business models can be highly sector-specific, often driven by demand-side mechanisms rather than simple cost reductions. Econometric evidence from manufacturing firms demonstrates that integrating secondary raw materials (SRM) into production lines does not necessarily lower short-term operational expenses; rather, firms adopting SRMs can face significantly higher perceived production costs. Despite these increased inputs, adopting firms have been shown to achieve an average turnover growth premium of 10%, indicating that market success can be sustained by corporate reputation and a consumer-driven "green premium".

Furthermore, there is a distinct sectoral heterogeneity in how firms capture value from circular innovations. While heavy industrial sectors (such as metallurgy, mechanics, and electronics) are more structurally predisposed to capture direct economic returns, with turnover increases exceeding 12%, lighter consumer goods and chemical sectors derive value primarily through non-monetary operational channels, recording significant efficiencies in water usage reduction and the optimization of primary resource consumption.

=== Digital circular economy ===
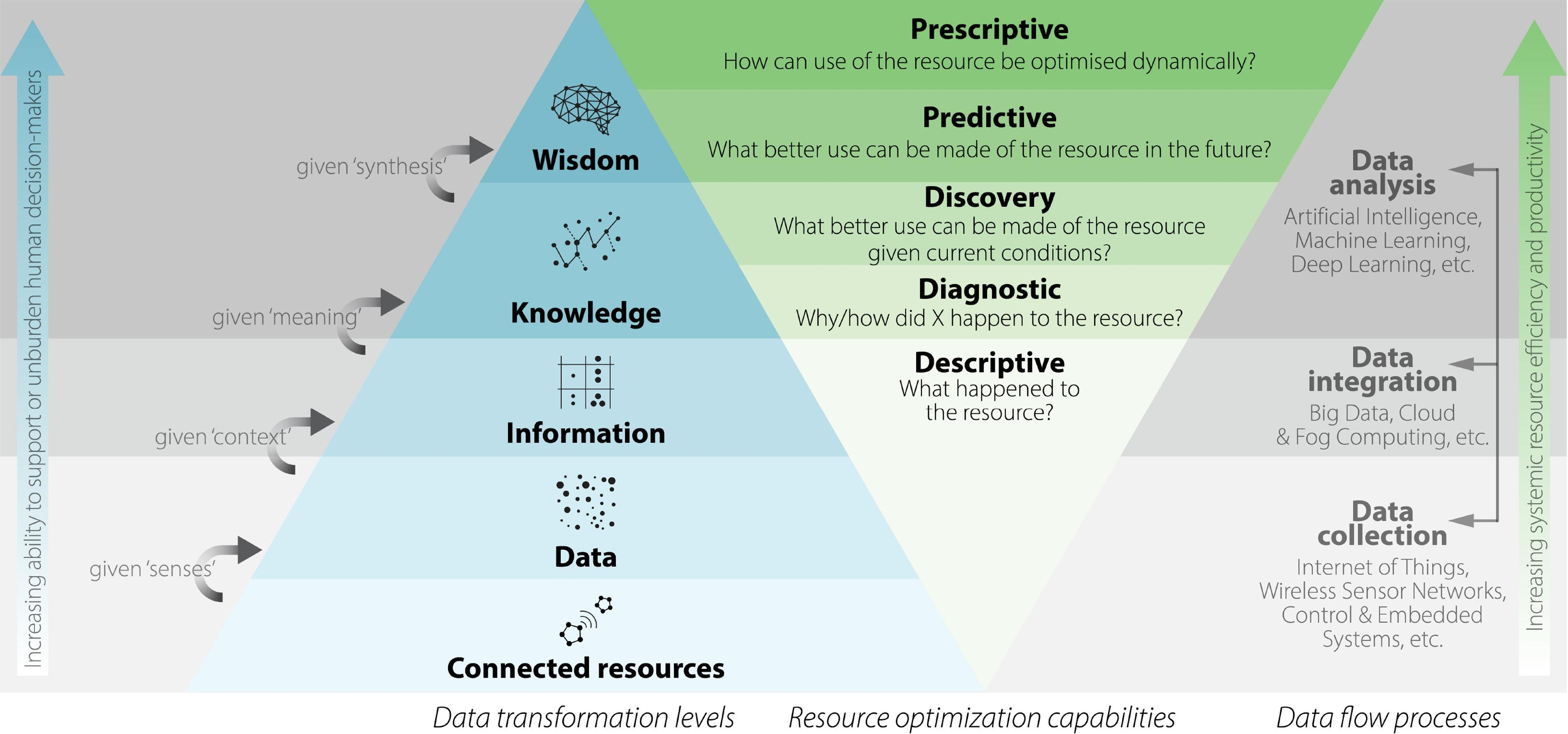
Smart circular economy framework

Building on circular business model innovation, digitalization and digital technologies (e.g., internet of things, big data, artificial intelligence, blockchain) are seen as a key enabler for upscaling the circular economy. Also referred to as the data economy, the central role of digital technologies for accelerating the circular economy transition is emphasized within the Circular Economy Action Plan of the European Green deal. The smart circular economy framework illustrates this by establishing a link between digital technologies and sustainable resource management. This allows assessment of different digital circular economy strategies with their associated level of maturity, providing guidance on how to leverage data and analytics to maximize circularity (i.e., optimizing functionality and resource intensity). Supporting this, a Strategic Research and Innovation Agenda for circular economy was published in the framework of the Horizon 2020 project CICERONE that puts digital technologies at the core of many key innovation fields (waste management, industrial symbiosis, products traceability). Some researchers have emphasised a need to comply with several requirements for implementing blockchain technology in order to make circular economy a reality.

=== Platform for Accelerating the Circular Economy (PACE) ===
In 2018, the World Economic Forum, World Resources Institute, Philips, Ellen MacArthur Foundation, United Nations Environment Programme, and over 40 other partners launched the Platform for Accelerating the Circular Economy (PACE). PACE follows on the legacy of WEF's CEO-led initiative, Project MainStream, which sought to scale up circular economy innovations. PACE's original intent has three focal areas:

1. developing models of blended finance for circular economy projects, especially in developing and emerging economies;
2. creating policy frameworks to address specific barriers to advancing the circular economy; and
3. promoting public–private partnership for these purposes.

In 2020, PACE released a report with partner Circle Economy claiming that the world is 8.6% circular, claiming all countries are "developing countries" given the unsustainable levels of consumption in countries with higher levels of human development.

PACE is a coalition of CEOs and Ministers—including the leaders of global corporations like IKEA, Coca-Cola, Alphabet Inc., and DSM, governmental partners and development institutions from Denmark, The Netherlands, Finland, Rwanda, UAE, China, and beyond. Initiatives currently managed under PACE include the Capital Equipment Coalition with Philips and numerous other partners and the Global Battery Alliance with over 70 partners. In January 2019, PACE released a report entitled "A New Circular Vision for Electronics: Time for a Global Reboot" (in support of the United Nations E-waste Coalition).

The coalition is hosted by a Secretariat headed by David B. McGinty, former leader of the Human Development Innovation Fund and Palladium International, and board member of BoardSource. Board Members include Inger Andersen, Frans van Houten, Ellen MacArthur, Lisa P. Jackson, and Stientje van Veldhoven.

=== Circular economy standards ===
==== BS 8001:2017 ====
To provide authoritative guidance to organizations implementing circular economy (CE) strategies, in 2017, the British Standards Institution (BSI) developed and launched the first circular economy standard "BS 8001:2017 Framework for implementing the principles of the circular economy in organizations". The circular economy standard BS 8001:2017 tries to align the far-reaching ambitions of the CE with established business routines at the organizational level. It contains a comprehensive list of CE terms and definitions, describes the core CE principles, and presents a flexible management framework for implementing CE strategies in organizations. Little concrete guidance on circular economy monitoring and assessment is given, however, as there is no consensus yet on a set of central circular economy performance indicators applicable to organizations and individual products.

==== ISO 59000 series ====
In 2018, the International Organization for Standardization (ISO) established a technical committee, TC 323, to develop frameworks, guidance, supporting tools, and requirements for the implementation of activities of all involved organizations in the field of circular economy. In 2024 and 2025, the committee published a series of four ISO standards:

- ISO 59004:2024 Vocabulary, principles and guidance for implementation;
- ISO 59010:2024 Guidance on the transition of business models and value networks;
- ISO 59020:2024 Measuring and assessing circularity performance;
- ISO 59040:2025 Product circularity data sheet.

== Strategic management in a circular economy ==
The CE does not aim at changing the profit maximization paradigm of businesses. Rather, it suggests an alternative way of thinking how to attain a sustained competitive advantage (SCA), while concurrently addressing the environmental and socio-economic concerns of the 21st century. Indeed, stepping away from linear forms of production most often leads to the development of new core competencies along the value chain and ultimately superior performance that cuts costs, improves efficiency, promote brand names, mitigate risks, develop new products, and meets advanced government regulations and the expectations of green consumers. But despite the multiple examples of companies successfully embracing circular solutions across industries, and notwithstanding the wealth of opportunities that exist when a firm has clarity over what circular actions fit its unique profile and goals, CE decision-making remains a highly complex exercise with no one-size-fits-all solution. The intricacy and fuzziness of the topic is still felt by most companies (especially SMEs), which perceive circular strategies as something not applicable to them or too costly and risky to implement. This concern is today confirmed by the results of ongoing monitoring studies like the Circular Readiness Assessment.

Strategic management is the field of management that comes to the rescue allowing companies to carefully evaluate CE-inspired ideas, but also to take a firm apart and investigate if/how/where seeds of circularity can be found or implanted. Prior research has identified strategic development for circularity to be a challenging process for companies, demanding multiple iterative strategic cycles. The book Strategic Management and the Circular Economy defined for the first time a CE strategic decision-making process, covering the phases of analysis, formulation, and planning. Each phase is supported by frameworks and concepts popular in management consulting—like idea tree, value chain, VRIE, Porter's five forces, PEST, SWOT, strategic clock, or the internationalization matrix—all adapted through a CE lens, hence revealing new sets of questions and considerations. Although yet to be verified, it is argued that all standard tools for strategic management can and should be calibrated and applied to a CE. A specific argument has already been made for the strategy direction matrix of product vs market and the 3 × 3 GE-McKinsey matrix to assess business strength vs industry attractiveness, the BCG matrix of market share vs industry growth rate, and Kraljic's portfolio matrix.

== Engineering the circular life cycle ==
In systems engineering, a 'life cycle' models the processes used to conceive, develop, produce, operate, support, and retire a system. Particular acceptable approaches are sometimes designated in heavily regulated industries, such as in civil aviation.

Complex and certified engineering systems, however, include many of the smaller products encountered on a daily basis, for example bicycles and household appliances.

=== The circular lifecycle for complex engineering systems ===
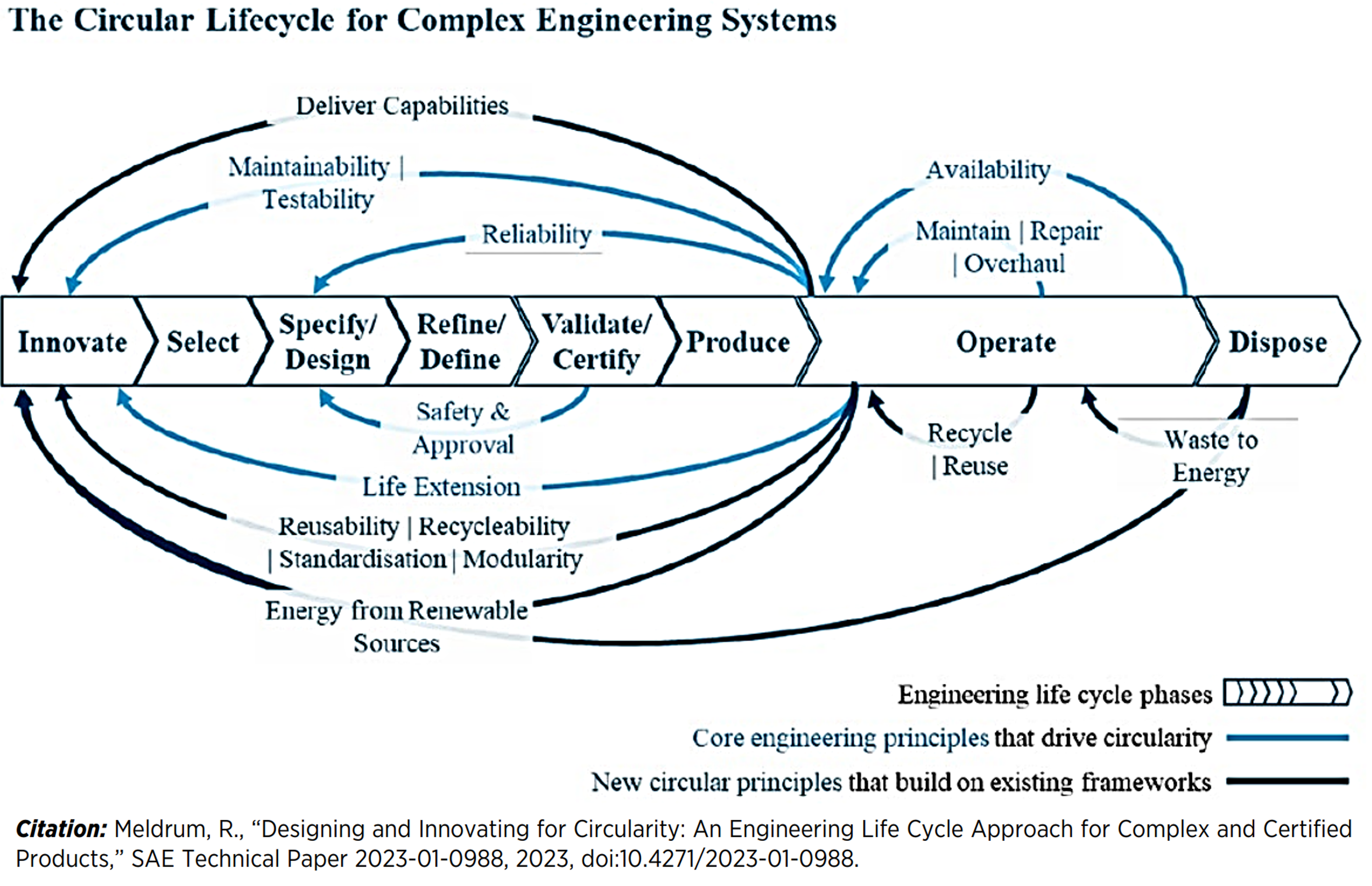
'Engineering the Circular Lifecycle: For Complex and Certified Systems. A framework for applying engineering principles to design and innovate for circularity.

Building on both the engineering lifecycle and the principles of the circular economy, the Circular Lifecycle for Complex Engineering Systems newly established framework, "Circular Lifecycle for Complex Engineering Systems", forms the core of this approach. This framework advocates for a reassessment of recognized engineering disciplines with an emphasis on integrating less familiar circular principles. Not to be confused with diagrams depicting the flow of materials, the Lifecycle framework identifies the most important design principles. It has been expanded to highlight the key circular principles, for consideration at each stage of the Lifecycle, by the design engineers responsible for the designing, certifying, and modifying of the system. It focuses on designing to meet user needs, the application of established engineering disciplines to achieve product longevity, engineering for the transition to renewable energy sources, and maximizing value generation from waste.

As with the traditional engineering lifecycle, this framework for engineering the Circular Lifecycle, can be applied to all engineering systems. The depth of activity at each stage in the Lifecycle can simply be tailored based on the complexity of the product or system.

==== Lifecycle-value stream matrix ====
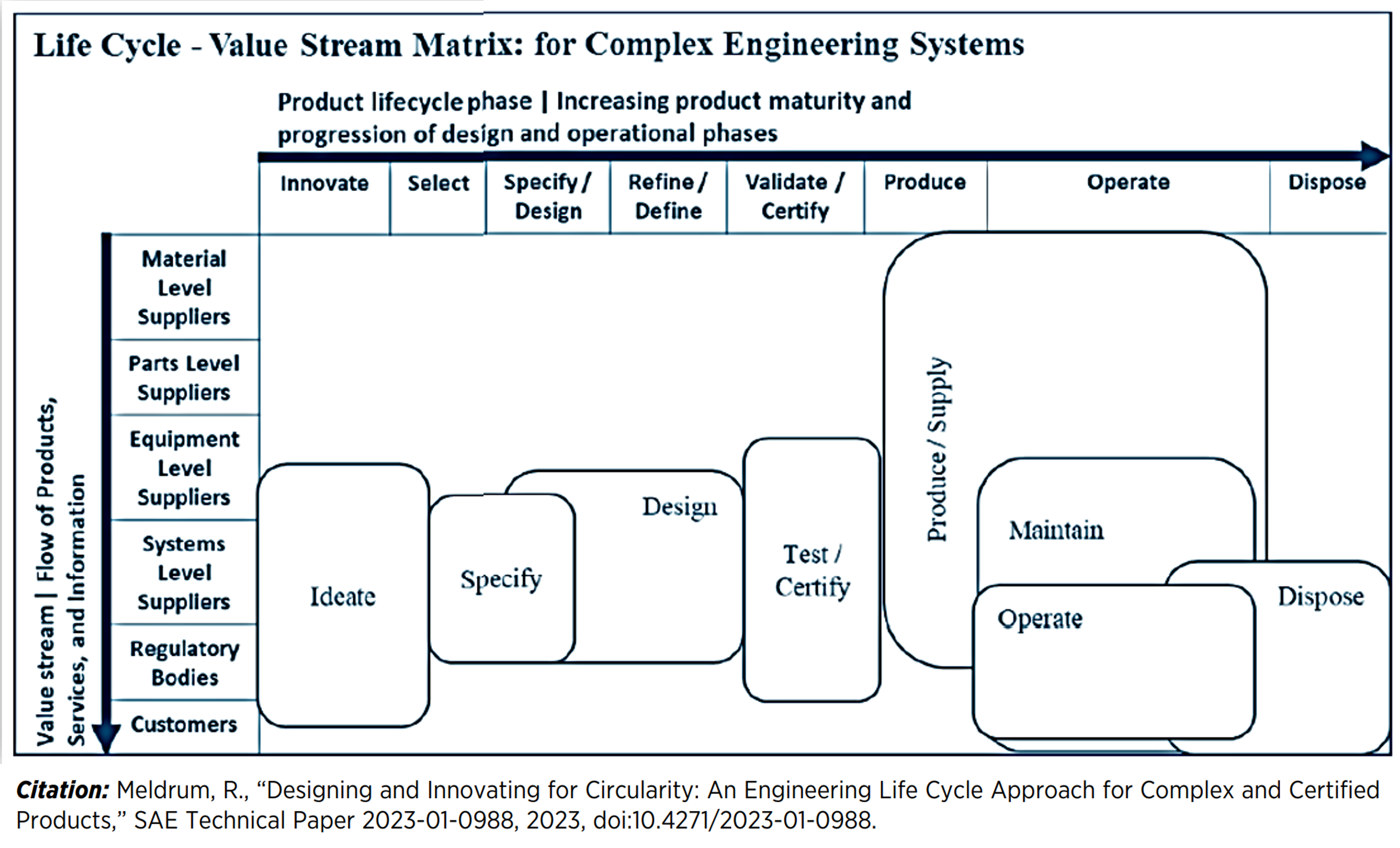
The life cycle – value stream matrix for a complex engineering system

The key to implementing the circular lifecycle for complex engineering systems is ensuring the engineering design team have a solid understanding of the product's ecosystem. The Lifecycle-Value Stream Matrix for complex and certified circular systems assists engineers and product design teams in visualizing the product's ecosystem more effectively.

The matrix captures the key value stream stakeholders, through the supply chain at the various levels of increasing complexity of system and equipment design. These suppliers will change throughout the life cycle. In the initial design phase of a complex engineering system the system-level design engineers would specify requirements and design the overall engineering system itself. As the high level design comes together, sub-system and equipment level suppliers are engaged and integrated into the platform and systems level design. Successful circular engineering principles are specified and designed within the overall platform requirements from the Innovate stage of the engineering lifecycle. As the engineering lifecycle continues, circular principles should continue to flow through the supply chain value stream, with each company challenging their suppliers to innovate and deliver products and services that facilitate circular operation and usage of the engineering system.

== Adoption and applications by industry ==
=== Textiles ===
A circular economy for textiles embraces a broad spectrum of practices, including the sale of second‑hand clothing, garment‑rental services, repair of damaged apparel, collection and recycling of textile waste, and the design and production of garments intended for durability and made from recycled fibers.

A circular textile economy is in response to the current linear model of the fashion industry, "in which raw materials are extracted, manufactured into commercial goods, and then bought, used, and eventually discarded by consumers". 'Fast fashion' companies have fueled the high rates of consumption which further magnify the issues of a linear system. "The take-make-dispose model not only leads to an economic value loss of over $500 billion per year but also has numerous negative environmental and societal impacts." Such environmental effects include tons of clothing ending up in landfills and incineration, while the societal effects put human rights at risk. A documentary about the world of fashion, The True Cost (2015), explained that in fast fashion, "wages, unsafe conditions, and factory disasters are all excused because of the needed jobs they create for people with no alternatives." This shows that fast fashion is harming the planet in more ways than one by running on a linear system.

It is argued that by following a circular economy, the textile industry can be transformed into a sustainable business. A 2017 report, "A New Textiles Economy", stated the four key ambitions needed to establish a circular economy: "phasing out substances of concern and microfiber release; transforming the way clothes are designed, sold, and used to break free from their increasingly disposable nature; radically improving recycling by transforming clothing design, collection, and reprocessing; and making effective use of resources and moving to renewable input". While it may sound like a simple task, only a handful of designers in the fashion industry have taken charge, including Patagonia, Eileen Fisher, Nathalia JMag, and Stella McCartney. An example of a circular economy within a fashion brand is Eileen Fisher's Tiny Factory, in which customers are encouraged to bring their worn clothing to be manufactured and resold. Similar initiatives are also found in Europe, where outdoor garment companies facilitate a textile return systems that encourage customers to bring back used garments for repair, redesign, resale, or recycling.

Circular initiatives, such as clothing rental start-ups, are also getting more and more highlight in the EU and in the US as well. Operating with circular business model, rental services offer everyday fashion, baby wear, maternity wear for rent. The companies either offer flexible pricing in a 'pay as you rent' model like Palanta does, or offer fixed monthly subscriptions such as Rent The Runway or Le Tote.

Research on the circular economy has highlighted the role of the informal sector in extending product life cycles. An Indian researcher from the Indian Institutes of Technology (IIT) has shown that street vendors contribute significantly to circular economy practices through the refurbishment and resale of second-hand clothing. However, the primary motivation for these vulnerable groups is not environmental sustainability, but livelihood generation. This phenomenon has been conceptualized as a livelihood-driven circular economy within the textile industry.

=== Construction industry ===
The construction sector is one of the world's largest waste generators. The circular economy appears as a helpful solution to diminish the environmental impact of the industry.

Construction is very important to the economy of the European Union and its state members. It provides 18 million direct jobs and contributes to about 9% of the EU's GDP. The main causes of the construction's environmental impact are found in the consumption of non-renewable resources and the generation of contaminant residues, both of which are increasing at an accelerating pace. In the European Union alone, people and companies generate more than 2 billion tonnes of garbage year, or 4.8 tonnes per person, mostly from the building, mining, and manufacturing sectors. Each individual in Europe generates half a tonne of municipal garbage annually, less than half of which gets recycled.

Cement production accounts for 2.4% of worldwide CO_{2} emissions from industrial and energy sources.

Decision making about the circular economy can be performed on the operational (connected with particular parts of the production process), tactical (connected with whole processes) and strategic (connected with the whole organization) levels. It may concern both construction companies as well as construction projects (where a construction company is one of the stakeholders).

End-of-life buildings can be deconstructed, hereby creating new construction elements that can be used for creating new buildings and freeing up space for new development.

Modular construction systems can be useful to create new buildings in the future, and have the advantage of allowing easier deconstruction and reuse of the components afterwards (end-of-life buildings).

Another example that fits the idea of circular economy in the construction sector on the operational level, there can be pointed walnut husks, that belong to hard, light and natural abrasives used for example in cleaning brick surfaces. Abrasive grains are produced from crushed, cleaned and selected walnut shells. They are classified as reusable abrasives. A first attempt to measure the success of circular economy implementation was done in a construction company. The circular economy can contribute to creating new posts and economic growth. According to Górecki, one of such posts may be the Circular economy manager employed for construction projects.

=== Automotive industry ===
The circular economy is beginning to catch on inside the automotive industry. A case study within the heavy-duty and off-road industry analyses the implementation of circular practices into a lean manufacturing context, the currently dominant production strategy in automotive. Lean has continuously shown to increase efficiency by eliminating waste and focusing on customer value, contributing to eco-efficiency by narrowing resource loops. However, other measures are needed to slow down and close the resource loops altogether and reach eco-effectiveness. The study finds significant potentials by combining the lean and the circular approach, to not only focus on the product and process levels (eco-efficiency), but also on the system perspective (eco-effectiveness). There are also incentives for carmakers to do so as a 2016 report by Accenture stated that the circular economy could redefine competitiveness in the automotive sector in terms of price, quality, and convenience and could double revenue by 2030 and lower the cost base by up to fourteen percent. So far, it has typically translated itself into using parts made from recycled materials, remanufacturing of car parts and looking at the design of new cars. Remanufacturing is currently limited to provide spare parts, where a common use is remanufacturing gearboxes, which has the potential of reducing the global warming potential (CO_{2}-eq) by 36% compared to a newly manufactured one.

With the vehicle recycling industry (in the EU) only being able to recycle just 75% of the vehicle, meaning 25% is not recycled and may end up in landfills, there is much to improve here. In the electric vehicle industry, disassembly robots are used to help disassemble the vehicle. In the EU's ETN-DEMETER project (European Training Network for the Design and Recycling of Rare-Earth Permanent Magnet Motors and Generators in Hybrid and Full Electric Vehicles) was researching the design of electric motors of which the magnets can be easily removed for recycling the rare earth metals.

Some car manufacturers such as Volvo are also looking at alternative ownership models (leasing from the automotive company; "Care by Volvo").

=== Logistics industry ===
The logistics industry plays an important role in the Dutch economy because the Netherlands is located in a specific area where the transit of commodities takes place on a daily basis. The Netherlands is an example of a country from the EU that has increasingly moved towards incorporating a circular economy given the vulnerability of the Dutch economy (as well as other EU countries) to be highly dependable on raw materials imports from countries such as China, which makes the country susceptible to the unpredictable importation costs for such primary goods.

Research related to the Dutch industry shows that 25% of the Dutch companies are knowledgeable and interested in a circular economy; furthermore, this number increases to 57% for companies with more than 500 employees. Some of the areas are chemical industries, wholesale trade, industry and agriculture, forestry and fisheries because they see a potential reduction of costs when reusing, recycling and reducing raw materials imports. In addition, logistic companies can enable a connection to a circular economy by providing customers incentives to reduce costs through shipment and route optimization, as well as, offering services such as prepaid shipping labels, smart packaging, and take-back options. The shift from linear flows of packaging to circular flows as encouraged by the circular economy is critical for the sustainable performance and reputation of the packaging industry. The government-wide program for a circular economy is aimed at developing a circular economy in the Netherlands by 2050.

Several statistics have indicated that there will be an increase in freight transport worldwide, which will affect the environmental impacts of the global warming potential causing a challenge to the logistics industry. However, the Dutch council for the Environment and Infrastructure (Dutch acronym: Rli) provided a new framework in which it suggests that the logistics industry can provide other ways to add value to the different activities in the Dutch economy. Examples of adding value in innovative ways to the Dutch economy are an exchange of resources (either waste or water flows) for production from different industries and changing the transit port to a transit hub concept. The Rli studied the role of the potentials of the logistics industry for three sectors, agriculture and food, chemical industries and high tech industries.

=== Agriculture ===
There has been widespread adoption of circular economic models in agriculture which is essential to global food security and to help mitigate against climate change, however there are also potential risks to human and environmental health from contaminants remaining in recycled water or organic material.

These risks can be mitigated by addressing three specific issues that will also depend on the local context. These are contaminant monitoring, collection, transport, and treatment, and regulation and policy.

The Netherlands, aiming to have a completely circular economy by 2050, intends a shift to circular agriculture as part of this plan. This shift plans on having a "sustainable and strong agriculture" by as early as 2030. Changes in the Dutch laws and regulations will be introduced. Some key points in this plant include:

- closing the fodder-manure cycle
- reusing as much waste streams as possible (a team Reststromen will be appointed)
- reducing the use of artificial fertilizers in favor of natural manure
- providing the chance for farms within experimentation areas to deviate from law and regulations
- implementing uniform methods to measure the soil quality
- providing the opportunity to agricultural entrepreneurs to sign an agreement with the Staatsbosbeheer ("State forest management") to have it use the lands they lease for natuurinclusieve landbouw ("nature-inclusive management")
- providing initiatives to increase the earnings of farmers

=== Furniture industry ===
When it comes to the furniture industry, most of the products are passive durable products, and accordingly implementing strategies and business models that extend the lifetime of the products (like repairing and remanufacturing) would usually have lower environmental impacts and lower costs. Companies such as GGMS are supporting a circular approach to furniture by refurbishing and reupholstering items for reuse.

The EU has seen a huge potential for implementing a circular economy in the furniture sector. Currently, out of 10,000,000 tonnes of annually discarded furniture in the EU, most of it ends up in landfills or is incinerated. There is a potential increase of €4.9 billion in Gross Value Added by switching to a circular model by 2030, and 163,300 jobs could be created.

A study about the status of Danish furniture companies' efforts on a circular economy states that 44% of the companies included maintenance in their business models, 22% had take-back schemes, and 56% designed furniture for recycling. The authors of the study concluded that although a circular furniture economy in Denmark is gaining momentum, furniture companies lack knowledge on how to effectively transition, and the need to change the business model could be another barrier.

Another report in the UK saw a huge potential for reuse and recycling in the furniture sector. The study concluded that around 42% of the bulk waste sent to landfills annually (1.6 million tonnes) is furniture. They also found that 80% of the raw material in the production phase is waste.

=== Oil and gas industry ===
Between 2020 and about 2050, the oil and gas sector will have to decommission 600 installations in the UK alone. Over the next decade around 840,000 tonnes of materials will have to be recovered at an estimated cost of £25Bn. In 2017 North Sea oil and gas decommissioning became a net drain on the public purse. With UK taxpayers covering 50–70% of the bill, discussion of the most economic, social and environmentally beneficial decommissioning solutions for the general public may lead to financial benefits.

Organizations such as Zero Waste Scotland have conducted studies to identify areas with reuse potential, allowing equipment to continue life in other industries, or to be redeployed for oil and gas.

=== Renewable energy industry ===
Oil and gas energy resources are incompatible with the idea of a circular economy, since they are defined as "development that meets the needs of the present while compromising the ability of future generations to meet their own needs". A sustainable circular economy can only be powered by renewable energies, such as wind, solar, hydropower, and geothermal.

What gives entities the ability to achieve 'net zero' carbon-emissions, is that they can offset their fossil fuel consumption by removing carbon from the atmosphere. While this is a necessary first step, global smart grid technologist, Steve Hoy, believes that in order to create a circular economy we should adapt the concept of 'True Zero' as opposed to 'net zero', which is eliminating fossil fuel consumption entirely so that all energy is produced from renewable sources.

Current growth projections in the renewable energy industry expect a significant amount of energy and raw materials to manufacture and maintain these renewable systems. "Due to the emissions attributed to fossil-fuel electricity generation, the overall carbon footprint of renewable energy technologies is significantly lower than for fossil-fuel generation over the respective systems lifespan." However, there are still linear trajectories when establishing renewable energy systems that should be assessed in order to fully transition to a circular economy.

=== Education industry ===
In 2018, The Ellen MacArthur Foundation identified 138 institutions with circular economy course offerings. Since then the theme of CE topics in teaching has been incorporated at a steadily increasing pace, with plans for adoption at university, city, and country wide levels. Zero Waste Scotland is an example of a country wide program that plans to implement CE into the Scottish education system through the "YES Circular Economy Challenge" which advocates that "every learning environment should have a whole-environment approach to learning for sustainability that is robust, demonstrable, evaluated and supported by leadership at all levels". A 2021 report by the EMF compares London and New York CE course offerings and finds that there is not a "whole-environment" representation when it comes to different CE topics, with an element of the technical CE cycle being covered in 90% and element of the biological cycle covered in 50% of the 80 analyzed circular economy courses. The EMF looks critically at the distribution of CE courses and researchers at Utrecht University Julian Kirchherr and Laura Piscicelli analyze the success of their introductory CE course in "Towards an Education for the Circular Economy (ECE): Five Teaching Principles and a Case Study". With 114 published definitions for the Circular Economy, synthesis and collaboration, previously exemplified, could benefit and popularize CE application in higher education.

=== Plastic waste management ===
Laws related to recyclability, waste management, domestic materials recovery facilities, product composition, biodegradability and prevention of import/export of specific wastes may support prevention of plastic pollution. A study considers producer/manufacturer responsibility "a practical approach toward addressing the issue of plastic pollution", suggesting that "Existing and adopted policies, legislations, regulations, and initiatives at global, regional, and national level play a vital role".

Standardization of products, especially of packaging which are, as of 2022, often composed of different materials (each and across products) that are hard or currently impossible to either separate or recycle together in general or in an automated way could support recyclability and recycling.

For instance, there are systems that can theoretically distinguish between and sort 12 types of plastics such as PET using hyperspectral imaging and algorithms developed via machine learning while only an estimated 9% of the estimated 6.3 billion tonnes of plastic waste from the 1950s up to 2018 has been recycled (12% has been incinerated and the rest reportedly being "dumped in landfills or the natural environment").

=== Rare-earth elements recovery ===
Despite the fact that e-waste contains a significant amount of rare-earth elements (REE), only 12.5% of e-waste is currently being recycled for all metals. Main concerns about REE recycling and reuse include environmental pollution during REE recycling and increasing recycling efficiency. Literature published in 2004 suggests that, along with previously established pollution mitigation, a more circular supply chain would help mitigate some of the pollution at the extraction point. This means recycling and reusing REEs that are already in use or reaching the end of their life cycle. A study published in 2014 suggests a method to recycle REEs from waste nickel-metal hydride batteries, demonstrating a recovery rate of 95.16%.

Rare-earth elements could also be recovered from industrial wastes with practical potential to reduce environmental and health impacts from mining, waste generation, and imports if known and experimental processes are scaled up. A green system for recovery of REEs from coal fly ash has been developed using citrate and oxalate with strong organic ligands capable of precipitating REEs. A 2019 study suggests that "fulfillment of the circular economy approach could reduce up to 200 times the impact in the climate change category and up to 70 times the cost due to the REE mining." In 2020, in most of the reported studies reviewed by a scientific review, "secondary waste is subjected to chemical and or bioleaching followed by solvent extraction processes for clean separation of REEs." One study suggests that by 2050, up to 40 to 75% of the EU's clean energy metal needs could come from local recycling.

A study estimates losses of 61 metals, showing that use spans of, often scarce, tech-critical metals are short. A study using Project Drawdown's modeling framework indicates that, even without considering costs or bottlenecks of expansion of renewable energy generation, metal recycling can lead to significant climate change mitigation.

=== Sewage Treatment ===
Nature-based sewage treatment methods are feasible to transform the organic matter/human excreta in the sewage for producing nutrient rich insect biomass, and bio-carbon dioxide, ammonia and methane gases. Such treatment method can also be used for the waste effluents generated from the high density fish and shrimp farms, urine rich waste water from the cattle farms, waste water generated from the biogas plants, vinasse effluent generated (after mixing with sewage to increase the pH) from sugar and alcohol plants, etc.

=== Chemistry ===
Researchers have developed recycling-routes for 200 industrial waste chemicals into important drugs and agrochemicals, for productive reuse that reduces disposal costs and hazards to the environment. A study has called for new molecules and materials for products with open-environmental applications, such as pesticides, that can be neither circulated nor recycled and provides a set of guidelines on how to integrate chemistry into a circular economy.

== Circular developments around the world ==
=== Overview ===
Already since 2006, the European Union has been concerned about environmental transition issues by translating this into directives and regulations. Three important laws can be mentioned in this regard:

- The Ecodesign Framework Directive
- The Waste Framework Directive
- The Registration, Evaluation, Authorisation and Restriction of Chemicals Regulation

On 17 December 2012, the European Commission published a document entitled "Manifesto for a Resource Efficient Europe".

In July 2014, a zero-waste program for Europe has been put in place aiming at the circular economy. Since then, several documents on this subject have been published. The following table summarizes the various European reports and legislation on the circular economy that have been developed between 2014 and 2018.In addition to the above legislation, the EU has amended the Eco-design Working Plan to add circularity criteria and has enacted eco-design regulations with circular economy components for 7 product types (refrigerators, dishwashers, electronic displays, washing machines, welding equipment and servers and data storage products). These eco-design regulations are aimed at increasing the reparability of products by improving the availability of spare parts and manuals. At the same time, the European research budget related to the circular economy has increased considerably in the last few years: it has reached 964 million euros between 2018 and 2020. In total, the European Union has invested 10 billion euros on Circular Economy projects between 2016 and 2019.

One waste atlas aggregates some data about waste management of countries and cities, albeit the data is very limited.

The "Circularity Gap Report" indicates that "out of all the minerals, biomass, fossil fuels and metals that enter the world's economy, only 8.6 percent are reused".

The European Commission's Circular Economy Action Plan has resulted in a wide range of projects, with an emphasis on waste and material sustainability, as well as the circularity of consumer items. Despite a huge number of EU legislative measures, the European Union's circularity rate was 11.5% in 2022 and is slowing down currently.

=== Programs ===
The "Manifesto for a Resource Efficient Europe" of 2012 clearly stated that "In a world with growing pressures on resources and the environment, the EU has no choice but to go for the transition to a resource-efficient and ultimately regenerative circular economy." Furthermore, the document highlighted the importance of "a systemic change in the use and recovery of resources in the economy" in ensuring future jobs and competitiveness, and outlined potential pathways to a circular economy, in innovation and investment, regulation, tackling harmful subsidies, increasing opportunities for new business models, and setting clear targets.

The European environmental research and innovation policy aims at supporting the transition to a circular economy in Europe, defining and driving the implementation of a transformative agenda to green the economy and the society as a whole, to achieve a truly sustainable development. Research and innovation in Europe are financially supported by the program Horizon 2020, which is also open to participation worldwide. Circular economy is found to play an important role to economic growth of European Countries, highlighting the crucial role of sustainability, innovation, and investment in no-waste initiatives to promote wealth.

The European Union plans for a circular economy are spearheaded by its 2018 Circular Economy Package. Historically, the policy debate in Brussels mainly focused on waste management which is the second half of the cycle, and very little is said about the first half: eco-design. To draw the attention of policymakers and other stakeholders to this loophole, the Ecothis, an EU campaign was launched raising awareness about the economic and environmental consequences of not including eco-design as part of the circular economy package.

In 2020, the European Union released its Circular Economy Action Plan.

==== "Closing the loop" (December 2015 – 2018) ====
This first circular economy Action Plan consisted of 54 measures to strengthen Europe's global competitiveness, promote sustainable economic growth and create more jobs. Among these 54 measures, for example, is the importance of optimizing the use of raw materials, products and waste in order to create energy savings and reduce greenhouse gas emissions. The main goal being in this respect to lead to the development of a framework conducive to the circular economy. In addition, the development of this Action Plan was also intended to enable the development of a new market for secondary raw materials. Concretely, here are the principal areas concerned by the Action Plan:

- Production
- Consumption
- Waste Management
- Boosting markets for secondary materials
- Innovation, investment and 'horizontal' measures
- Monitoring progress

The Action plan was also a way to integrate a policy framework, an integration of existing policies and legal instruments. It includes notably some amendments. As a matter of fact, the implementation of this new plan was supported by the European Economic and Social Committee (EESC). This support included in-depth consultation.

==== Circular Economy Action Plan of 2020 ====
This new action was adopted by the European Commission in March 2020. A total of 574 out of 751 MEPs voted in favour of the action plan. It focuses on better management of resource-intensive industries, waste reduction, zero-carbonization and standardization of sustainable products in Europe. Prior to the development of this new action plan, we can also mention the Green Deal of 2019, which integrated ecological and environmental ambitions to make Europe a carbon-neutral continent. On 10 February 2021, the European Parliament submitted its proposals to the Circular Economic Action Plan (CEAP) of the commission, highlighting five major areas in particular. Those are the following:

- Batteries
- Construction and demolition
- ICT
- Plastics
- Textiles

Two additional sectors on which the CEAP focuses could be added: packaging & food and water.

==== World Circular Economy Forum ====
The World Circular Economy Forum (WCEF) aims to bring the public and private sectors together to create a better way to use resources and build resilient economies. It is a global initiative of Finland and the Finnish Innovation Fund SITRA and has been held annually since 2017 in countries such as Belgium, Brazil, Canada, Finland, Japan and Rwanda. Besides governments and ministries, partners include groups like Circle Economy Foundation, the International Resource Panel, the Brazilian Agency for Industrial Development, the International Labour Organization, the Ellen MacArthur Foundation and the European Commission. The 2026 event will take place in India.

=== Ranking country efforts ===
The European leaders in terms of circular economy are designated mostly by their current efforts for a shift towards circular economy but also by their objectives and the means implemented in this shift. It remains difficult to precisely rank how countries score in terms of circular economy, given the many principles and aspects of it and how differently one single country can score in each of these principles but some tendencies do appear in the average score, when combining the principles.

- The Netherlands: the government aims to reuse 50% of all materials as far as possible by 2030 and to convert waste into reusable materials anywhere it is possible. The next goal is then to make the country shift towards a 100% waste-free economy by 2050. These objectives were all set from 2016 to 2019 in a series of programs for a governmental circular economy, raw materials agreements and transition agendas focusing on the five most important sectors for waste: biomass and food, plastics, manufacturing industry, construction and consumer goods.
- Germany: Germany is a leader in some aspects of circular economy, like waste management and recycling.
- France is also adding several texts and measures for a better circular economy in the country such as the roadmap for circular economy in 2018, consisting of 50 measures for a successful transition to circular economy.
- Belgium is also a consequent actor in the field. It scored second in the circular material use rate, before France but after the Netherlands. In the other principles of circular economy, it usually scores in the top 5.

Other notable countries are Italy, the United Kingdom, Austria, Slovenia, and Denmark.

Outside the EU, countries such as Brazil, China, Canada, the US and especially Japan are working on the shift towards it.

Most countries that are in the lead in the field of circular economy are European countries, meaning that Europe in general is in the lead group at the moment. The reasons behind this are numerous. First of all, circular economy is a field that is, at the moment mostly advanced in the developed countries, thanks to, between others, technology. The efforts of the European Commission are also non negligible, with documents such as the Commission staff working document "Leading the way to a global circular economy: state of play and outlook" or the new action plan for circular economy in Europe, being one of the main blocs of the green deal.

While Europe as a whole is a good actor in the field, some European countries are progressing slower in this field. These trend is particularly evident in East European countries - Romania, Hungary, Bulgaria, Slovakia, etc. It is also notable in some sectors in Portugal, Greece, Croatia and even Germany.

In 2018, the newspaper Politico made a ranking of the (by then) 28 European countries by making an aggregation of the seven key metrics of the commission for each country. The advantage here is that it gives a general view of how countries work towards circular development and how they compare to each other but the main drawback is that, as mentioned in the article, the seven metrics all have equal weight and importance in Politico's calculations, which is not the case in real life. Indeed, it is said in the same article that the countries that score the highest in CE are not necessarily the greenest according to the Environmental Performance Index. For example, Germany, which scores 1st in the Politico ranking, only scores 13th worldwide in the EPI and is behind 10 European countries.

=== China ===
China's efforts to promote the circular economy are influenced by the legacy of its "complete utilization" principle. Complete utilization was a waste-recycling and production efficiency principle that had developed in the 1950s as a response to material scarcity in the early PRC; its underlying philosophy was expressed in the slogan "turning waste into treasure and harm into benefit".

Beginning in the early 2000s, China started passing a series of laws and regulations to promote the circular economy. In 2005, China's National Development and Reform Commission issued a policy document requiring maximization of recycling and reuse of wastewater, exhaust gas, and water residue generated during mining and smelting. In 2008, China passed a Circular Economy Promotion Law.

Policymakers' views expanded from a focus on recycling to broad efforts to promote efficiency and closed-loop flows of materials at all stages, from production to distribution to consumption. As part of its efforts to enhance the circular economy, China is attempting to decrease its reliance on mining for its mineral supply. Academic Jing Vivian Zhan writes that promoting the circular economy helps China to avoid the resource curse and helps to alleviate overreliance on extractive industries.

As of 2018, a major barrier to achieving a circular economy in China is poor enforcement of regulation, particularly at lower levels of government.

As of 2026, China promotes the circular economy as a top-down national objective which aims to "decouple environmental pressure from environmental growth".

=== European Union ===
Since 2015, there is a plan concerning the circular economy adopted by the European Commission. This first plan includes 54 actions. There are also 4 legislative proposals with the objective of legal change.

a) the framework directive on waste
b) the directive on the landfill of waste
c) the directive on packaging and packaging waste
d) the directive on batteries and accumulators and their waste

During the 2018 negotiations between the Parliament and the council, different elements will be adopted in four directives. These are mainly: « The main objectives are the following in the European framework

- Minimum 65% of municipal waste to be recycled by 2035
- Minimum 70% of all packaging waste to be recycled by 2030
- Maximum 10% of municipal waste to be landfilled by 2035
- Certain types of single use plastic will be prohibited to place on market as of July 2021
- Minimum 32% of the Union's gross final consumption of energy to originate from renewable sources by 2030

The main objectives are the following in the European framework.

Since 2020, Europe's new green deal plan focuses on "design and production from the perspective of the circular economy", its main objective is to ensure that the European economy keeps these resources as long as possible.The action plan of this circular development is mainly based on different objectives. They are:

- "To make sustainable products the norm in the EU.
- To empower consumers to choose.
- Focusing on the most resource-intensive sectors with a high potential to contribute to the circular economy.
- Ensure less waste."

Europe's green deal, which came into being in 2019, aims at a climate-neutral circular economy. For this, a distinct difference between economic growth and resources will be found. "A circular economy reduces the pressure on natural resources and is an indispensable prerequisite for achieving the goal of climate neutrality by 2050 and halting biodiversity loss."

From 2019 to 2023, the European Investment Bank funded €3.83 billion to co-finance 132 circular economy initiatives across many industries. Circular economy initiatives with a higher risk profile have secured finance through risk-sharing instruments and EU guarantees.

==== Benelux ====
===== Belgium =====
Since 2014, Belgium has adopted a circular strategy. This is marked by 21 measures to be followed. In Belgium, the three Belgian regions (Flanders, Brussels and Wallonia) have different personal objectives. For Flanders, a strategy called Vision 2050 has been put in place. For Wallonia, there is a plan following the declaration of the regional policy for Wallonia from 2019 to 2024. Since 23 January 2020, Wallonia has adopted a new strategy including three governance bodies: a steering committee, an intra-administration platform and an orientation committee.

For Brussels, a plan was adopted in 2016 to develop the circular economy in its region. This plan will be in place for a period of 10 years.

===== The Netherlands =====
The Netherlands set a plan of action for circular economy in 2016 and have been doing additional efforts for a transition towards a 100% circular economy by 2050 (and 50% by 2030). The Netherlands Organization for Applied Scientific Research estimates that a full shift towards Circular Economy will, at the long term, generate not less than 7.3 billion euros and 540,000 new jobs in the sector. The work will be developed around the five pillars mentioned above: plastics, biomass and food, the construction sector, the manufacturing industry, and consumer goods. The government has also put a fund in place to facilitate and accelerate the shift. These funds are part of the 300 million € annually spent by the government for climate-related decisions and actions. The envelope is also completed by the ministry of infrastructure, which allocated €40 million for circular economy-related actions in 2019 and 2020.

Other actions, such as an allocation of subsidies for enterprises that make change or invest in the field have been taken. Initiatives at the subnational level are also encouraged and regions such as Groningen, Friesland, the Northern Netherlands, etc. ere taking actions to not only reduce their environmental impact but accelerate and accentuate their actions towards Circular economy.

===== Luxembourg =====
CE is one of the major deals of the 2018-2023 Luxembourg government.

The Luxembourg added in 2019 Circular economy in their data-driven innovation strategy, considering it now as a crucial field for innovation in the next years. It is present in most sectors of the country's development plan even if it is still only at the beginning of its development.

More initiatives are starting to emerge, however, to develop better in the field:

- The 2019 "Circular economy strategy Luxembourg", a document testifying on the efforts made and to be made and the willingness to transform the Grand Duchy into an example in the field;
- Holistic strategic studies such as the "strategic group for circular economy";
- Insertion of circular economy as a subject to be discussed by all the six main pillars of the "third industrial revolution";
- Creation of the Fit4Circularity program to allocate funds to innovative businesses in the field;
- Participation in Circular economy-related events such as "Financing the circular economy" (2015) at the European Investment Bank or the "Circular economy hotspot" (2017);
- Work on educational tools in the field;
- Collaboration with municipalities, at the subnational level, to encourage them to become more circular;
- The establishment of value chains for local materials such as wood and a better management of raw materials in general;
- A cooperation between the public and the private sector;
- The 'Product Circularity Data Sheet' (PCDS) launched in 2019 by the government to study and determine the circular potential of products and materials;
- An implementation of tools and methods such as a regulatory framework (laws), a financial framework (financial helps and sanctions), creation, management and sharing of knowledge on the subject, etc.;
- A coordination of the Luxembourg goals with the SDGs and the 2030 agenda.

=== United Kingdom ===
In 2020, the UK government published its Circular Economy Package policy statement in coordination with the Welsh and Scottish governments.

==== England ====
From 1 October 2023, certain single-use plastic items have been placed under bans or restrictions in England.

==== Scotland ====
In 2021 the Scottish Parliament banned single use plastics being provided by businesses.

In 2024, the Scottish Parliament passed the Circular Economy (Scotland) Act 2024, which would require the setting of targets and providing updates to the strategy to achieve those targets as frequently as 5 years or more frequently than that.

==== Wales ====
In 2021, the Welsh Government published its Circular Economy strategy.

In 2023, the Senedd banned single use plastics, which would require the setting of targets and providing updates to the strategy to achieve those targets as frequently as 5 years or more frequently than that.

==== Northern Ireland ====
In 2022, the Northern Ireland Executive held a Circular Economy consultation.

=== Circular bio-economy ===
The bio-economy, especially the circular bio-economy, decreases dependency on natural resources by encouraging sustainable goods that generate food, materials, and energy using renewable biological resources (such as lupins). According to the European Commission's EU Science Center, the circular bio-economy produces €1.5 trillion in value added, accounting for 11% of EU GDP. The European Investment Bank invests between €6 billion and €9 billion in the bio-economy per year.

==== The European Circular Bioeconomy Fund ====
Eligibility requirements and core terms of reference for an equity and mezzanine debt fund were established by the European Investment Bank and the European Commission directorates-general for agriculture and research and innovation. As a result, an investment adviser was chosen, and the European Circular Bioeconomy Fund was created. As of 2023, a €65 million investment from the EIB has been made.

The European Circular Bioeconomy Fund invests in early-stage companies with developed innovations that are searching for funds to broaden their activities and reach new markets. It specifically invests in:

- circular/bio-economy technologies,
- biomass/feed stock production that boots agricultural productivity while lowering environmental impact,
- biomass/feed stock technologies that result in higher-value, green goods,
- bio-based chemicals and materials, and
- biological alternatives in fields such as cosmetics.

=== Circular Carbon Economy ===
During the 2019 COP25 in Madrid, architect William McDonough and marine ecologist Carlos Duarte presented the Circular Carbon Economy at an event with the BBVA Foundation. The Circular Carbon Economy is based on McDonough's ideas from Carbon Is Not The Enemy and aims to serve as the framework for developing and organizing effective systems for carbon management. McDonough used the Circular Carbon Economy to frame discussions at the G20 workshops in March 2020 before the framework's formal acceptance by the G20 Leaders in November 2020.

== Critiques of circular economy models ==
There is some criticism of the idea of the circular economy. As Corvellec (2015) put it, the circular economy privileges continued economic growth with soft "anti-programs", and the circular economy is far from the most radical "anti-program". Corvellec (2019) raised the issue of multi-species and stresses "impossibility for waste producers to dissociate themselves from their waste and emphasizes the contingent, multiple, and transient value of waste". "Scatolic engagement draws on Reno's analogy of waste as scats and of scats as signs for enabling interspecies communication. This analogy stresses the impossibility for waste producers to dissociate themselves from their waste and emphasizes the contingent, multiple, and transient value of waste".

A key tenet of a scatolic approach to waste is to consider waste as unavoidable and worthy of interest. Whereas total quality sees in waste a sign of failure, a scatolic understanding sees a sign of life. Likewise, whereas the Circular Economy analogy of a circle evokes endless perfection, the analogy of scats evokes disorienting messiness. A scatolic approach features waste as a lively matter open for interpretation, within organizations as well as across organizational species.

Corvellec and Stål (2019) are mildly critical of apparel manufacturing circular economy take-back systems as ways to anticipate and head off more severe waste reduction programs:

Apparel retailers exploit that the circular economy is evocative but still sufficiently vague to create any concrete policies (Lüdeke‐Freund, Gold, & Bocken, 2019) that might hinder their freedom of action (Corvellec & Stål, 2017). Their business-centered qualification of take-back systems amounts to an engagement in "market action ... as leverage to push policymakers to create or repeal particular rules", as Funk and Hirschman (2017:33) put it.

Research by Zink and Geyer (2017: 593) questioned the circular economy's engineering-centric assumptions: "However, proponents of the circular economy have tended to look at the world purely as an engineering system and have overlooked the economic part of the circular economy. Recent research has started to question the core of the circular economy—namely, whether closing material and product loops do, in fact, prevent primary production."

There are other critiques of the circular economy (CE). For example, Allwood (2014) discussed the limits of CE 'material circularity', and questioned the desirability of CE in a reality with growing demand. The problem CE overlooks is how displacement is governed mainly by market forces, according to McMillan et al. (2012). It's the tired old narrative, that the invisible hand of market forces will conspire to create full displacement of virgin material of the same kind, said Zink & Geyer (2017). Korhonen, Nuur, Feldmann, and Birkie (2018) argued that "the basic assumptions concerning the values, societal structures, cultures, underlying world-views and the paradigmatic potential of CE remain largely unexplored".

It is also often pointed out that there are fundamental limits to the concept, which are based, among other things, on the laws of thermodynamics. According to the second law of thermodynamics, all spontaneous processes are irreversible and associated with an increase in entropy. It follows that in a real implementation of the concept, one would either have to deviate from the perfect reversibility in order to generate an entropy increase by generating waste, which would ultimately amount to still having parts of the economy which follow a linear scheme, or enormous amounts of energy would be required (from which a significant part would be dissipated in order to for the total entropy to increase). In its comment to concept of the circular economy the European Academies' Science Advisory Council (EASAC) came to a similar conclusion:

Recovery and recycling of materials that have been dispersed through pollution, waste and end-of-life product disposal require energy and resources, which increase in a nonlinear manner as the percentage of recycled material rises (owing to the second law of thermodynamics: entropy causing dispersion). Recovery can never be 100% (Faber et al., 1987). The level of recycling that is appropriate may differ between materials.

In addition to this, the circular economy has been criticized for lacking a strong social justice component. Indeed, most circular economy visions, projects and policies do not address key social questions regarding how circular economy technologies and solutions will be controlled and how their benefits and costs will be distributed. To respond to these limitations some academics and social movements prefer to speak of a circular society rather than a circular economy. They thereby advocate for a circular society where knowledge, political power, wealth, and resources are sustainably circulated in fundamentally democratic and redistributive manners, rather than just improving resource efficiency as most circular economy proposals do.

Moreover, it has been argued that a post-growth approach should be adopted for the circular economy, in which material loops are put (directly) at the service of well-being, rather than attempting to reconcile the circular economy with GDP growth. For example, efficiency improvements at the level of individual products could be offset by a growth in total or per-capita consumption, which only beyond-circularity measures like choice editing and rationing unsustainable products or emissions may be able to address. Moreover, while conventional circular economy frameworks prioritise technical sophistication over social equity, and low-tech solutions sometimes lack scalability and effectiveness, open-source practices can reconcile the often-competing demands of technological advancement and social justice by localising manufacturing, customisation, and repair.

== Related concepts ==
The various approaches to 'circular' business and economic models share several common principles with other conceptual frameworks, such as:

- Cradle-to-cradle design is a biomimetic approach to the design of products and systems that models human industry on nature's processes
- Industrial ecology is the study of material and energy flows through industrial systems. Focusing on connections between operators within the "industrial ecosystem", this approach aims at creating closed-loop processes in which waste is seen as input, thus eliminating the notion of undesirable by-product.
- Resource recovery is using wastes as an input material to create valuable products as new outputs. The aim is to reduce the amount of waste generated, therefore, reducing the need for landfill space and also extracting maximum value from waste.

== See also ==
- Appropriate technology
- BlueCity
- Circular Carbon Economy Initiative
- Circular procurement
- Container-deposit legislation
- Degrowth
- Digital Product Passport
- Doughnut (economic model)
- Downcycling
- Durable good
- European Green Deal
- Extended producer responsibility
- Food vs. feed
- Ecological civilization
- Earth jurisprudence
- Rights of nature
- Scale (analytical tool)
- Government by algorithm
- Green economy
- Industrial symbiosis
- Infrastructure and economics
- Infrastructure-based development
- Life cycle assessment
- Life cycle thinking
- Path analysis (statistics)
- Regenerative economics
- Reuse
- Reverse vending machine
- Sharing economy
- Social metabolism
- Synthetic fuels
- Sustainable products § Sustainable product policies
- Throw-away society
- Upcycling
- Waste & Resources Action Programme
- Waste heat recovery

=== Lists of related content ===
- Index of environmental articles
- Outline of economics
