= Stahel =

Stahel is a surname. Notable people with the surname include:

- David Stahel (born 1975), military historian
- Florian Stahel (born 1985), footballer
- Julius Stahel (1825–1912), soldier
- Reiner Stahel (1892–1955), military officer
- Rolf Stahel (born 1944), Swiss businessman
- Walter R. Stahel (born 1946), Swiss architect
