= China's circular economy =

A circular economy is an alternative way countries manage their resources, in which usage of products in the traditional linear make, use, and dispose method is not implemented. Instead, resources are used for their maximum utility throughout their life cycle and regenerated in a cyclical pattern minimizing waste. They strive to create economic development through environmental and resource protection. The ideas of a circular economy were officially adopted by China in 2002, when the 16th National Congress of the Chinese Communist Party legislated it as a national endeavor though the various sustainability initiatives which were implemented in the previous decades starting in 1973. China adopted the circular economy due to the environmental damage and resource depletion that was occurring from going through its industrialization process. China is currently a world leader in the production of resources, where it produces 46% of the world's aluminum, 50% of steel and 60% of cement, while it has consumed more raw materials than all the countries a part of the Organisation for Economic Co-operation and Development (OECD) combined. In 2014, China created 3.2 billion tonnes of industrial solid waste, where 2 billion tonnes were recovered using recycling, incineration, reusing and composting. By 2025, China is anticipated to produce up to one quarter of the world's municipal solid waste.

China is constantly introducing new legislation to improve the effectiveness of their circular economy and sustainability initiatives. Every five years the Chinese Government introduces a new five-year plan, with different sustainability goals and economic growth targets the country would like to achieve. China is currently on its 13th Five-Year Plan, which was legislated on March 15, 2016. Other legislation that have been implemented in the last decade, which have been important in the development of China's circular economy, are The Law for the Promotion of the Circular Economy, Circular Economy Development Strategies and Action Plan, and the 12th Five-Year Plan. China is also active in developing policies aimed at establishing more sustainability practices and economic growth in future decades, with targets for the year 2020 and beyond.

Circular economies can be implemented on a corporate (micro), inter-firm (meso) and societal level (macro). Corporate level implementation refers to initiatives related to the Eco-design of manufacturing plants, such as cleaner production and Environmental Management Systems (EMS) that are meant to reduce the production of harmful by-products. Inter-firm initiatives at the meso level are the implementation of Eco-Industrial Parks (EIPs), where industrial plants are constructed in close proximity and capitalize on the trading of industrial by-products, ultimately reducing waste. Societal level initiatives refer to the development of Eco-cities and Eco-provinces, which aims to address the social concerns with both production and consumption of products that pollute.

China has various means of measuring the performance of their circular economy initiatives in regional and industrial park areas, including material flow analysis (MFA), life cycle analysis (LCA), CO_{2} emissions and economic returns. These performance indicators are helpful in measuring the effectiveness of the government's initiatives, though they are not the most efficient. The idea of introducing an Emergy indicator system has been debated, where it is capable of measuring the performance of resource generation and product dimensions using accounting indices and ratios.

== Background ==
Circular economies are based on the 3R principle: reduce, re-use and recycle. Reduce refers to a method of improving efficiency, where the input of resources are reduced, and output levels are increased. Re-use is the implementation of integrated systems that use recycled material in the input stage of the manufacturing process, where there is less reliance on raw materials. The recycling principle revolves around implementing strategies that transform collected waste and normal output into a resource that can be used.

The major economic reformation that occurred in China during the late 1970s caused the economy to experience rapid economic growth, increased international trade and large flows of foreign direct investment due to the attractive business environment of China’s new economy. The accelerated industrialization process of China's economy directly contributed to negative impacts on the environment, where there was a significant worsening of pollution, waste generation and resource depletion. China produces 46% of the world's aluminum, 60% of cement and 50% of steel, while consuming more raw materials than all 35 OECD countries combined. China uses 2.5 kilograms of raw material to produce $1 GDP, while OECD countries only require 0.54 kilograms. The surge in output of heavy industries coupled with resource inefficiency, as well as levels of consumption comparable to the Western world, has influenced China into adopting a circular economy to ensure sustainable growth.

Since China is experiencing their industrialization process later than many other countries, they have benefited from the latecomer effect, where they have learned from the success and failures of other nations when creating policies of their own. China has primarily learned from the circular economy strategies of Germany and Japan, where they have shaped many of China's policies revolving around the three R's of re-use, reduce, recycle. Japan's Basic Law for Establishing Promoting the Creation of a Recycling-Oriented Society and Germany's Closed Substance Cycle and Waste Management Act have been the greatest influence on China's circular economy strategies. Japan has been successful in influencing whole industries into adopting sustainability strategies, where they view recycling measures as a competitive advantage rather than a liability. China has learned from this by making EIP's and industry-wide recycling initiatives as core functions of their circular economy. Germany has been effective in promoting sustainable material management through better product design and interdependence between industrial projects, whereas China has advanced these techniques in their own sustainability endeavours. There has also been a rise in university collaboration between Chinese and German institutions over the years, which has allowed for more research and development of better strategies that China can implement.

== Legislation ==
=== Previous ===
Sustainable economics started to surface in China around 1973, when the first ever National Environmental Protection Conference was held to discuss new environmental policies and guidelines. The following year Chinese State Council created The Leading Group of Environmental Protection, whose task was to formulate effective policies based on previous discussions at the National Environmental Protection Conference. In 1979, the most comprehensive environmental protection law adopted by China was enacted called the Environmental Protection Law of the People’s Republic of China, where basic policies were introduced to address conflicts between industrial growth and environmental sustainability. Some of the new policies introduced were aimed at controlling the growth of large urban zones and the distribution of manufacturing plants in rural areas, through designing and expanding small cities. Other environmental policies enacted in the law targeted the reduction of pollution, through taxing incentives for pollution control and fines for violations. The Chinese government started taking environmental protection more seriously in 1983 after the second National Environmental Protection Conference, where it made environmental protection a core national policy. In the subsequent decades to follow, numerous policies were implemented from the conferences until 2002, when the 16th National Congress of the Chinese Communist Party designed a sustainable development plan that aimed to quadruple GDP, increase social equality, recover and protect environmental integrity. This new sustainable development plan was enshrined in legislation and was then known as the start of a circular economy.

=== Current ===
==== The Law for the Promotion of the Circular Economy ====
The Law for the Promotion of the Circular Economy was passed on August 29, 2008, during the fourth meeting of the Standing Committee of the 11th National People's Congress, where it was then implemented into practice on January 1, 2009. The law was outlined as a key strategy in national economic and social development, while promoting resource utilization efficiency, natural environment protection and sustainable development. The law contends that circular economy strategies will be implemented only if it is viable in technology, practical in economy, and suitable for saving resources and protecting the environment. The State Council is responsible for the administration of promoting the circular economy, where they must organize, coordinate and regulate national circular economy strategies. Under the law, any new industrial policies created by the Government must meet the criteria for promoting a circular economy. Industries must implement management systems that reduce resource usage and waste generation, while improving resource recovery and recycling. Through the Law for the Promotion of the Circular Economy, the Chinese Government encourages research, development, promotion and international cooperation of science relating to circular economies, as well as supporting the education, publicity and popularization of scientific knowledge. The aim is to give citizens a better sense of better resource saving and environmental protection practices.

==== The 12th Five-Year Plan ====
The 12th Five-Year Plan was implemented from 2011 to 2015 as a national development strategy plan, where it outlined the country's shift in policy toward the recycling of heavy industrial resources, instead of previous models that practiced resource efficiency. Some objectives of the plan were to increase the re-using of industrial waste to 72% by 2015, while raising resource output efficiency by 15%. The plan outlined a three level strategy, where 10 critical recycling initiatives for industrial waste and converting industrial parks were implemented, 100 pilot cities such as Guangzhou and Suzhou were decided to test the initiatives, and a 1000 more industrial parks were to be created. There was an investment of US$468 billion to achieve the goals presented in the plan, where it was also directed at internalizing sustainability goals within the institutions and promoting a new growth pattern based on renewable energy. The goal of the initiatives was to get 50% of national industrial parks and 30% of provincial ones to undergo a complete circular economy transition by 2015, where there will eventually be close to zero emission of pollutants and waste.

==== The Circular Economy Development Strategies Action Plan ====
The Circular Economy Development Strategies Action Plan was created on January 23, 2013, and it further embedded the idea of a circular economy into Chinese legislation. The plan outlined three levels of circular economies in China, being within a company, industrial park and city or region. The plan outlines various targets for 2015 and 2020, where they are meant to address both industrial and social sectors. The goals that were meant to be fulfilled by 2015 are having a widely used resource recycling technology that is advanced, re-using 72% of industrial solid waste, a modern system for recovering at least 70% of waste products, and improving the recovery of important resources. Other goals include raising energy productivity by 18.5%, increasing water productivity by 43%, aiding the recycling industry to reach US$276 billion of output, and re-using 70% of some minerals that are heavy pollutants. The goals for 2020 outlined in the plan include having an innovative industrial technological system that can efficiently re-use and recycle material, as well as the creation of a new industry related to the manufacturing of innovative technical equipment that promotes competitive advantages. The advanced industrial technological systems should be able to address the waste management concerns of rural and urban areas by 2020.

==== The 13th Five-Year Plan ====
The 13th Five-Year Plan was released on December 5, 2016, it outlines growth plans for the 2016-2020 interim. The plan is based on three core ideas, being strengthening management solutions, improving the quality of the environment and accelerating the repair of environmental damage. The plan puts an emphasis on improving the quality of water resources, through unit based management, basin-wide initiatives to address water pollution, protection of water bodies with good quality, creating strategies to tackle ground water pollution, and improving water quality in both urban and rural areas. Water quality is expected to reach grade III or equivalent for 70% of the country's surface water by 2020, according to the plan. There is also a focus on soil pollution, where there is going to be more implementation of comprehensive monitoring. The goal is to be able to use 90% of polluted soil, which is an increase from 70.6% in 2015. A new environmental protection tax and compensation framework is outlined in the plan, which is aimed at promoting the green bond market in the country. Other key goals of the 13th Five-Year Plan include promoting circular production to establish a circular economy at all levels in society, creating a circular development system with new resource strategies, reducing waste and consumption, increasing resource efficiency, and supporting green initiatives. The plan also expects resources productivity to increase by 15% from 2015 levels, while the utilization rate of solid waste should reach 73%. Over 75% of national industrial parks and more than 50 provincial industrial parks should be practicing complete circular strategies by 2020. The output value of the recycling industry is expected to reach US$450 billion.

==== The 14th Five-Year Plan ====
China's 14th Five-Year Plan (2021–2025) for the circular economy emphasizes enhancing resource efficiency, recycling industries, and waste reduction. Key quantitative targets include a 20% increase in major resource output efficiency, reducing energy and water use per GDP unit by 13.5% and 16%, achieving a 60% utilization rate for construction waste, using 320 million tons of scrap steel annually, and producing 20 million tons of recycled non-ferrous metals. The plan supports China's sustainability, resource security, and carbon neutrality goals.

== Implementation ==
=== Micro ===
Micro level strategies refer to small scale corporate initiatives that aim to reduce pollution and promote circular usage of waste, through better environmental management systems, cleaner production, waste reduction and improved Eco-design of industrial plants. Many laws have been enacted to influence companies to engage in micro-level initiatives, whether it be from fines for mismanaging waste or tax incentives for using green technology. Improving cleaner production has been the most prominent and successful micro level strategy China has experimented with. Cleaner production strategies include removing toxic by-products from the production process, reducing pollutants throughout the life cycle of a product and including sustainability concerns when designing or delivering finished products. Cleaner production initiatives have been implemented in 24 provinces covering various industrial sectors, such as pharmaceuticals, metallurgy, transportation, chemical, machine manufacturing and textiles. To promote cleaner production, the Chinese government has constructed various institutions to support micro level initiatives, namely, four cleaner production centres in the industrial sector, eleven cleaner production centres at the local level and one national cleaner production centre. These centres have trained thousands of people, where it has provided over 550 training programs for teaching individuals about cleaner production.

=== Meso ===
Meso level strategies refer to inter-firm initiatives, mainly eco-industrial parks (EIPs), where industrial plants are constructed in close proximity and capitalize on the trading of industrial by-products, ultimately reducing waste. To encourage the development of EIPs, the Chinese government has outlined various national guidelines, through the State Environmental Protection Administration (SEPA). The national guidelines emphasize the need for integrated management systems for water, material and energy at the industrial park level, as well as the creation and support of eco-industrial systems between companies. Industrial park managers can reach their desired goals of waste minimization with maximum resource efficiency, through reducing the amount of energy and pollution used in product delivery. This is achieved through effective green supply chain management and recycling or redesigning packaging material. Chinese industrial parks are very different from the ones in North America, as they serve two purposes, being supporting circular economies in residential and manufacturing areas. A typical EIP consists of a residential, manufacturing, scientific research and business area, where they all share the benefits of a circular economy, since they are connected with one another. Since the EIPs have various stakeholders dependent on each other, planners have had to create plans that address both residential and manufacturing areas. Some of these guidelines include, community eco-education and establishing specific working groups to implement the plans, while supporting dialogue between stakeholders. Over 100 EPIs have been guided by established principles, while 16 of the EIP's have been chosen as national demonstrations by SEPA.

=== Macro ===
Macro level strategies refer to initiatives at the societal level that address both the concerns of production and consumption, through the development of eco-cities and eco-provinces. The goal of eco-cities and eco-provinces is to establish the whole region as a circular economy, where everything is powered by recycled renewable energy and produces close to zero carbon waste. As of 2003 cities such as Shanghai, Yangzhou, Guiyang and Hangzhou have all cemented plans for establishing an eco-city. To address the concerns of production on a societal level regional eco-industrial networks are encouraged, where they optimize efficient material use. The proliferation of scavenger and decomposer companies as an eco-industrial network has been beneficial in macro level strategies, as they are able to profit from turning waste into reusable organic, plastic, metal and other materials. The Chinese government supports these types of companies through preferential industrial recruitment and financial policies, such as land subsidies and tax incentives. To address the role of consumption on a societal level, the government and individuals are held accountable. Consumers are guided away from wasteful consumption, while the government supports environmental protection in daily life. Residents have seen an increase in choices of organic food free of pesticides, while recycled products have been labelled green to encourage its use. The production of harmful products that pollute has slowly been phased out by the government, such as chlorofluorocarbons (CFCs) from refrigerators.

== Measurement indicators ==
The main indicator system used to measure China's circular economy is an altered version of the European Union's (EU) material flow analysis (MFA). MFA is a quantitative method of measuring the flow of natural resources and materials through various scales of economy, which can range from whole cities to single rivers. It consists of methodically organized indices, where it then uses mass balancing to analyze the relationships between human activities, material flows and environmental degradation. The MFA can be altered to examine anything from all the energy flowing through an economy to a single chemical element, such as carbon. The indicator system is effective in identifying the inefficient use of energy, natural resources and materials, as well as how material flow shifts affect the country's economy and environment.

The Chinese government has extensively studied the EU's and Japan’s models of material flow analysis, where they have adapted it to fit their needs using the input of various actors and government agencies. The Chinese indicator system is based on the 3R principle, where two separate indicator systems are used for meso and macro level measurement. The only difference between the two indicator systems is that macro level measurement takes into account recycling at the regional level. Both indicator systems categorize quantitative data in the same four categories, being resource output, resource consumption, integrated resource utilization and reduction in waste generation. Resource output is the measure of GDP produced from consumption of land, energy and water, where higher ratios indicate resource efficiency. Resource consumption refers to the measurement of resources consumed per unit GDP level, where lower ratios indicate that less resources were used by the economic system. The implications for this measurement are that it demonstrates that there are fewer impacts on the natural environment, while having high economic returns. Integrated resource utilization measures the rates of re-using industrial water and recycling industrial waste, where high ratios indicate efficient resource recycling and regeneration of those materials back into the economy. Having a high ratio on the integrated resource utilization indicator demonstrates a reduction in the use of natural resources and waste being sent to landfill sites. The reduction in waste generation indicator measures the total amount of waste disposal and emission of pollutants, where lower ratios indicate that there are low levels of waste needed to be disposed of and low levels of toxic emissions.

China has also experimented with other measurement indicators, such as life cycle analysis (LCA), CO_{2} emissions and economic returns, though MFA continues to be the most widely used. There has been extensive research on a new measurement system called the emergy indicator, which is thought to be more effective than the MFA.
