= Circular procurement =

Approach towards a circular economy

Circular procurement is the procurement of products and services that follow circular economy principles, prioritizing reuse, durability, and recycling within supply chains to extend product life cycles and minimize waste. It may involve acquiring goods and services designed for longevity or reuse, incorporating shared-use models, refurbishing existing assets, and purchasing products containing recycled materials.

According to the United Nations Environment Programme (UNEP), the practice emphasizes the design, production, use, reuse, and recycling of products to maximize their value during use and at the end of their life cycle. Circular procurement is often regarded as an aspect of sustainable procurement and can be incorporated into supply chain management or public procurement frameworks.

== Policy ==
Circular public procurement contributes to the Sustainable Development Goals (SDGs) outlined by the United Nations in the 2030 Agenda for Sustainable Development. In particular SDG 12, Responsible Consumption and Production, includes a target to promote sustainable public procurement practices in line with national policies and priorities.

The European Union Circular Economy Action Plan is a policy framework designed to address the environmental and resource impacts across the life cycle of products.

Circular procurement can be implemented at several levels:

- Product level: Focuses on the production and end-use of specific products, such as the use of recycled and recyclable materials, resource efficiency, and products that can be disassembled after use.
- Supplier level: Relates to how suppliers integrate circular practices into their systems and processes to ensure that their products and services meet circular procurement criteria. Examples include internal and external product reuse, product repairability, and supplier take-back systems.
- System level: Involves contractual approaches that support circular practices, such as supplier take-back agreements, product-as-a-service models, and cooperation between organizations for sharing/reuse.

== Objectives and outcomes ==
Circular procurement may contribute to the objectives of a circular economy within supply chain management. A 2014 report by the World Economic Forum, and the Ellen MacArthur Foundation projected that broader adoption of circular economy practices could contribute approximately $1 trillion in material savings annually by 2025 and create roughly 100,000 jobs across multiple sectors within five years. A study of 255 Chinese manufacturers found that circular procurement was associated with reduced costs and improved financial performance.

== Criticism ==
In the construction industry, barriers to the adoption of circular procurement can be categorized as hard or soft. Hard barriers include the absence of circular design practices, reverse logistics systems, standardized frameworks, and business models. Soft barriers, on the other hand, encompass limited stakeholder engagement, lack of trust, and resistance to organizational change.

Identified risks include vulnerability to greenwashing and insufficient assessment of environmental and social impacts.

Practical barriers include high infrastructure costs, the absence of standardized definitions or enforcement mechanisms, and limited scalability beyond pilot projects. Additional challenges include overcoming the prevailing perception that circular practices could hinder a region's economic or material development.
