= Five-year plans of China =

Series of development initiatives by the CCP

In the People's Republic of China, five-year plans (Chinese: 五年计划; pinyin: Wǔnián Jìhuà) are a series of social and economic development initiatives issued by the Chinese Communist Party (CCP) since 1953. Since 1949, the CCP has shaped the Chinese economy through the plenums of its Central Committee and national party congresses. The plenums follow a customary pattern of themes; since the 14th Party Congress (1992–1997), the fifth plenum has evaluated the current five-year plan and outlined the next five-year plan.

Planning is a key characteristic of the nominally socialist economies, and one plan established for the entire country normally contains detailed economic development guidelines for all its regions. In order to more accurately reflect China's transition from a Soviet-style command economy to a socialist market economy (socialism with Chinese characteristics), the plans since the 11th Five-Year Plan for 2006 to 2010 have been referred to in Chinese as "guidelines" (Chinese: 规划; pinyin: guīhuà) instead of as "plans" (Chinese: 计划; pinyin: jìhuà).

== Role ==
Medium and long-term planning are central to coordinating state activity across many policy areas in China and China's Five-Year Plans are one of the most prominent examples of this approach. Through the Five-Year Plans, the CCP and the government establish their policy priorities. Five-Year Plans continue to be a central means of organizing policy in China, especially in the areas of environmental protection, education, and industrial policy.

Formulation of a new five-year plan generally begins midway through the current plan. The formulation usually takes two to three years and involves series of rounds such as evaluation, preliminary research, drafting and revisions, and soliciting public input. The initial formulation of a Five-Year Plan begins with fairly short, general guidelines prepared by the CCP Central Committee in the fall prior to the start of a Plan period. More detailed plans are drafted by the State Council and approved by the National People's Congress the following March. These plans establish national priorities and outline how they will be met. Administratively, the Plans result in the development of numerous specific action plans across different levels of administration. These programs evolve over the course of the plan period. As academic Sebastian Heilmann observes, this process is best viewed as a planning coordination and evaluation cycle rather than a unified blueprint.

China's Five-Year Plans have been praised for their efficiency, capabilities and their importance to rapid economic growth, development, corporate finance and industrial policies.

== First Plan (1953–1957) ==
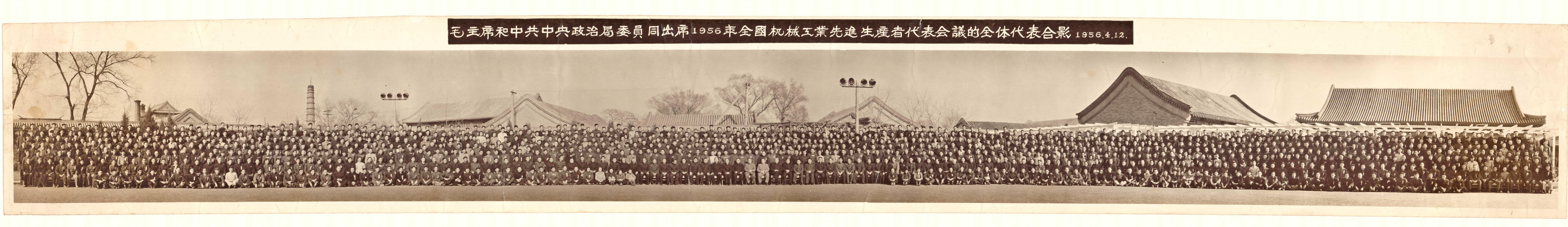
Chairman Mao and Various Leaders of the First Five Year Plan - 1956

Having restored a viable economic base, the leadership under CCP Chairman Mao Zedong, Premier Zhou Enlai, and other revolutionary veterans sought to implement what they termed a socialist transformation of China. The First Five-Year Plan was deeply influenced by Soviet methodologies and assistance from Soviet planners. Industrial development was the primary goal. With Soviet assistance in the form of both funds and experts, China began to develop industries from scratch. Consistent with the focus on developing industry, northeast China was the region which received the greatest share of state funds during the First Plan.

The 1st Five-Year Plan phrased its developmental focus in the terminology of revolution. It attributed the backwards state of China's economy to contradictions between the developing productive forces and the capitalist relations of production. Agriculture, fishing, and forestry would be collectivized. Regarding commercial and services industries, the approach in the first Five-Year Plan was for the government to buy them out, including through coercing reluctant sellers if necessary.

Government control over industry was increased during this period by applying financial pressures and inducements to convince owners of private, modern firms to sell them to the state or convert them into joint public-private enterprises under state control. The Plan strained agricultural production. In terms of economic growth, the 1st Five-Year Plan was quite successful, especially in those areas emphasized by the Soviet-style development strategy. During this Plan period, China began developing a heavy-industrial base and brought its industrial production above what it had been prior to war. China also raised its agricultural production to above prewar levels, resulting primarily from gains in efficiency brought about by the reorganization and cooperation achieved through cooperative farming. Although urbanization had not been a specific goal of the plan's focus on industrialization, industrialization also prompted extensive urban growth. By 1956, China had completed its socialist transformation of the domestic economy.

== Second Plan (1958–1962) ==
This plan was created to accomplish several tasks, including:

- Expanding heavy industry in China.
- Furthering the cause of socialism by transferring more property to collective ownership.
- Encouraging the economic growth of China through industry, agriculture, handicrafts, transportation and commerce.
- Cultivating cultural and scientific development of the Chinese people.
- Strengthening national defense and improving living standards in China.

The Political Bureau of the CCP had determined that gross value of agricultural products should increase 270%; in fact, the gain was a considerably more modest 35%. The country saw increases in capital construction over those observed during the first Five-Year Plan and also saw significant increases in industry (doubling output value) and income (workers and farmers, increase by as much as 30%).

However, the Great Leap Forward, which diverted millions of agricultural workers into industry, and the great sparrow campaign, which led to an infestation of locusts, as well as natural and weather based issues, caused a huge decrease in food production. Simultaneously, rural officials, under huge pressure to meet their quotas, vastly overstated how much grain was available. Thus, a massive nationwide famine ensued.

The policies of the Second Plan's Great Leap Forward departed from the approach in the Soviet-inspired First Plan, which stressed central command and extensive planning. Instead, the approach entailed local areas marshalling all available resources for large projects. In 1960–61, attempts were made to redirect twenty million workers into agricultural production and to reallocate investment into those industrial sectors that could further support agriculture. This shift was also in sharp contrast to the rapid industrialization seen in the First Five-Year Plan.

== Third Plan (1966–1970) ==
The 3rd Plan was originally due early in 1963, but at that time China's economy was too dislocated, as a result of the failure of the Great Leap Forward and four poor harvests to permit any planned operations. No five-year plan ultimately covered the period 1963–1965.

As initially conceived, the 3rd Five Year Plan emphasized further development in China's already more developed coastal areas and a greater focus on consumer goods. It called for enhancing "eating, clothing, and daily use" items (chi, chuan, yong). During discussions of the 3rd Five Year Plan, Mao acknowledged that during the Great Leap Forward, "We set revenue too high and extended the infrastructure battlefront too long," and that it was "best to do less and well."

The Plan ultimately called for the prioritization of national defense in the light of a possible big war, actively preparing for conflicts and speeding up construction in three key areas; national defense, science and technology, and industry and transport infrastructure. The turn towards a greater emphasis on developing heavy industries and national defense industries was prompted by the Gulf of Tonkin incident, which increased fears among Chinese leadership that the United States would ultimately invade China. Support among leadership for Mao's proposed Third Front construction increased as a result and changed the direction of the 3rd Five Year Plan.

== Fourth Plan (1971–1975) ==
The Fourth Five Year Plan sought decentralization and prioritized "small scale, indigenous, and labor intensive" development projects over "large scale, foreign, and capital intensive" development.

== Fifth Plan (1976–1980) ==
The central government stipulated the 1976–1985 Ten Year Plan Outline of Developing National Economy (Draft) in 1975, which included the 5th Five-Year Plan.

In March 1978, the Ten Year Development Outline was amended because the original version in 1975 stipulated that by 1985, steel and petroleum outputs should reach 60 and 250 million tons respectively, and 120 large projects, including 10 steel production bases, nine non-ferrous metal bases, eight coal bases and 10 oil and gas fields, should be built. To achieve these goals, the government would invest 70 billion yuan in infrastructure construction, equaling total national investment over the previous 28 years. These were impossible targets and ran counter to economic development rules.

The Plan put forward suggestions to set up an independent and comparatively complete industrial system and national economic system from 1978 to 1980.

With the implementation of the Plan, considerable success was achieved. In 1977, the gross output value of industry and agriculture reached 505.5 billion yuan, 4.4% above-target and representing an increase of 10.4% compared with the previous year. Gross domestic product for 1978 reached 301 billion yuan, an increase of 12.3% compared with 1977, and an increase of 19.4% compared with 1976.

However, during this period, the Chinese economy developed too quickly, and the very high goals triggered the onset of yet another round of mistakes. In December 1978, the 3rd Plenary Session of the 11th Central Committee of the Chinese Communist Party shifted the work focus of the CCP to modernization. The Session emphasized that the development should follow economic rules and proposed readjustment and reform measures, which indicated that national economic development had entered a new phase, one of exploration and development. In April 1979, the central government formally put forward new principles of readjustment, reform, rectification and improvement.

== Sixth Plan (1981–1985) ==
According to China Daily, the 6th Plan was first planned as part of the "Ten Year National Economic Development Plan Outline for 1976–1985" until the State Council decided to redraft the country's mid- and long-term plans in 1980. The 1982 national planning meeting was again mainly focused on the drafting of the Plan. It was only in December that year that the fifth meeting of the 5th National People's Congress officially ratified the Plan.

The Sixth Five-Year Plan was the first to address government policy support for solar PV panel manufacturing. Policy support for solar panel manufacturing has been a part of every Five-Year Plan since.

== Seventh Plan (1986–1990) ==
In late September 1985, the Conference of CCP Delegates convened to adopt the "Proposal for the 7th Five Year Plan" which was set to begin in 1986. The proposal demonstrated a shift from direct government control over enterprises to using indirect macroeconomic controls to "establish a new system for the socialist economy." In March 1986, the State Council submitted "The 7th Five Year Plan for National Economic and Social Development of the People's Republic of China, 1986–1990" to the Fourth Session of the 6th National People's Congress for review and ratification. It was the first time in China's history that an all-round plan for social and economic development was created at the start of a new five-year plan.

The national goals of the Plan included speeding up development on the coast, with inland regions role's being to "support and accelerate coastal development." During this Plan period, different regions of China were encouraged to develop by leveraging their respective advantages. Coastal regions were instructed to focused on "the restructuring of traditional industries, new industries, and consumer goods production." Western regions were to focus on processing and agriculture. In central regions, energy, construction, and minerals were the focus.

== Tenth Plan (2001–2005) ==
During the 10th Five-Year Plan, the strategic purpose of planning shifted from narrow, quantitative growth targets to coordinating structural and qualitative changes in economic and social growth targets.

The Plan described science, technology, and human resources as decisive areas to improve for China to catch-up with the most advanced countries.

Focuses included growing the services sector, developing domestic economic demand, rural urbanization, and western development.

Environmental sustainability was also addressed. Goals included increasing forest coverage to 18.2%, and the urban green rate to 35%. The total amount of major urban and rural pollutants discharged were targeted for a 10% reduction as compared with 2000, and more measures would be taken to protect and save natural resources.

== Eleventh Plan (2006–2010) ==
The planning philosophy for the 11th Five-Year Plan was significantly shaped by a mid-term evaluation of the 10th Five-Year Plan. The 11th Five-Year Plan introduced a new category of "binding targets" (yueshuxing zhibiao) intended as government promises. These binding targets have since been used especially in non-economic policy areas like environmental protection and land management. Of 22 targets listed in the 11th Five-Year Plan, eight of them were binding targets. These binding targets were incorporated into the criteria for local cadre performance evaluations. The Plan also reflected a change in terminology to the allocation of administrative resources via "programs" rather than "plans."

== Twelfth Plan (2011–2015) ==
The 12th Five-Year Guideline was debated in mid-October 2010 at the fifth plenary session of the 17th Central Committee of the Chinese Communist Party, the same session in which Xi Jinping was selected as Vice Chairman of the Central Military Commission, and the full proposal for the plan was released following the plenum and approved by the National People's Congress on 14 March 2011. The plan shifted emphasis from investment towards consumption and development from urban and coastal areas toward rural and inland areas – initially by developing small cities and greenfield districts to absorb coastal migration. The plan also continued to advocate objectives set out in the Eleventh Five-Year Plan to enhance environmental protection, accelerate the process of opening and reform, and emphasize Hong Kong's role as a center of international finance. It prioritized more equitable wealth distribution, increased domestic consumption, and improved social infrastructure and social safety nets. Improvements in the social safety net were intended to reduce precautionary saving. The plan sought to expand the services industry in order to increase employment and continue urbanization to help raise real wages.

== Thirteenth Plan (2016–2020) ==
Continuing themes from the 12th Five-Year Plan, the 13th Five-Year Plan also sought to boost the services sector, increase urbanization, and expand the social safety net to reduce precautionary savings. It also emphasized innovation, the completion of building a moderately prosperous society, and started the "Made in China 2025" plan.

== Fourteenth Plan (2021–2025) ==
The 14th Five-Year Plan was drafted during the fifth plenum of the 19th Central Committee held from 26 to 29 October 2020. Han Wenxiu, the deputy director of the Office of the Central Finance and Economic Commission, said CCP general secretary Xi Jinping had personally led the drafting process through multiple meetings of the Politburo, its standing committee, and the drafting panel that he headed.

The Plan was drafted against the backdrop of worsening China–United States relations and the COVID-19 pandemic, which caused China's economy to shrink in the first quarter of 2020 – the first time in 44 years. Continuing themes from the prior two plans, the Fourteenth Five-Year Plan also seeks to boost the services sector, increase urbanization, and expand the social safety net to reduce precautionary savings. To address the aging of China's population, the Plan seeks to expand healthcare and retirement system initiatives. The Plan also emphasizes high-tech innovation.

== Fifteenth Plan (2026–2030) ==
The 15th Five-Year Plan will cover 2026 to 2030. Planning began in December 2023. It may aim to meet CCP general secretary Xi Jinping's goal of doubling the size of the economy between 2020 and 2035.

== See also ==
- China's circular economy
- Five-year plan
- Five-year plans of the Soviet Union
- Five-Year Plans of Vietnam
- Five-year plans of Hong Kong
