= Blue City, Oman =

Blue City
- Town
- Location in Oman
- Coordinates: 23°46′48″N 57°47′24″E
- Country: Oman
- Region: Al Batinah Region
- Time zone: UTC+4 (+4)

Blue City (Al Madina A'Zarqa) was a planned city project in the Sultanate of Oman with a $20 billion budget. The city was supposed to spread over 32 square kilometers and 16 kilometers of coastline along the coastal region at Al Sawadi, 45 minutes from Muscat.

When completed, the city would have included 20 hotels, hospitals, and a university. It was to have shopping centers, a marina, and schools. Al Madina A'Zarqa supported the government Vision 2020 in diversifying the sultanate's economy from fossil fuel.

== About the Blue City ==
Located on a peninsula 30 minutes from Muscat Seeb Airport, Al Madina A'Zarqa was to be a 32-square-kilometer (12 sq mi) waterfront city built along 16 kilometers (9.9 mi) of shoreline adjacent to the Gulf of Oman.

One of the largest-scale developments in the Middle East, the Al Madina A'Zarqa represented an investment of between $15–$20 billion. The first round of financing was secured through the issuing of a bond note by Bear Stearns on international markets raising US$925 million. The note was rated Baa3 by ratings agency Moody's in March, 2007, following on from a BBB− rating by Fitch Ratings when the note was issued. Bear Stearns was subsequently awarded "Middle East Leisure Deal of the Year 2006" by Project Finance for the arranging of the Blue City note.

The organization behind the project was Al Sawadi Investment & Tourism Company (ASIT) which had the endorsement of the government of Oman to bring the development to life.

== International involvement ==
The project was financed by the U.S. financial group Oppenheimer. The Oppenheimer company itself became embroiled in controversy, as it was forced to admit that it has no involvement with the Oppenheimer fortune of South Africa. "There is more money available here for investment but we did not want to bring in money from the Gulf region. We wanted to be different, so we looked at European and American collaboration and that is good for the country in general. It is good for rating when investors come in from the United States, Britain, or Germany. Our project has helped the rating of the government because of the way we dealt with this", says Mr. Issa.

== Expected completion ==
The project was expected to be completed by 2020. In 2010 the project was close to liquidation, until eventually it was bought in 2012 by the Oman sovereign wealth fund and then closed down.
