= Circular Carbon Economy Initiative =

The Circular Carbon Economy Initiative is an initiative proposed by the Kingdom of Saudi Arabia during its presidency of the G20 Summit in November 2020 in Riyadh. The initiative was adopted by the G20 countries as an integrated global framework for addressing and managing greenhouse gas emissions through various technologies. This concept is the cornerstone for rebalancing the global carbon cycle.

== National Program for the Circular Carbon Economy ==
The Circular Carbon Economy methodology is based on reducing, reusing, recycling, and removing carbon dioxide emissions from the environment. In an effort to advance this approach, Saudi Arabia launched the National Program for the Circular Carbon Economy, led by King Abdullah University of Science and Technology (KAUST), with the aim of reshaping the scientific dialogue on carbon and integrating energy flows and carbon resources into a circular economic system. These efforts are in line with Saudi Vision 2030, as the program operates according to four main strategies: reduce, reuse, recycle, and remove. These pillars are designed to reduce emissions and promote sustainable economic and social growth.

=== Field Projects and Initiatives ===
As part of the implementation process, Saudi Arabia announced at the Saudi Green Initiative Forum in Sharm El-Sheikh the launch of the first phase of a regional carbon capture and storage center in Jubail, with an initial capacity of 9 million tons per year by 2027, with a subsequent expansion to 44 million tons per year by 2035.

The Kingdom also launched three pilot carbon capture projects in the electricity, cement, and mining sectors, in partnership with KAUST, NEOM, the Saudi Electricity Company, Al Safwa Cement, Ma'aden, and Gulf Cryo. These projects aim to support the implementation of a circular carbon economy and reduce emissions in energy-intensive industries.

=== Efforts of Saudi Universities and Companies ===
King Abdullah University of Science and Technology (KAUST) leads scientific research in carbon management technologies and is working to develop innovative solutions including next-generation solar cells, hydrogen production, wastewater treatment, and smart agriculture based on waste recycling. Saudi Aramco applies the latest Fourth Industrial Revolution technologies, such as artificial intelligence and big data, to reduce emissions and is one of the least carbon-intensive companies in the exploration and production sector.

SABIC was one of the first global companies to establish a carbon recovery plant, which has processed 500,000 tons of carbon dioxide annually since 2015 to produce materials used in agriculture, food, and chemicals. The company continues to expand its circular economy solutions as part of its sustainability strategy. KAUST Research Conference: Improving Energy Efficiency in the Circular Economy.

== See also ==
- Saudi Green and Middle East Green Initiatives.
