= Walter R. Stahel =

Swiss architect

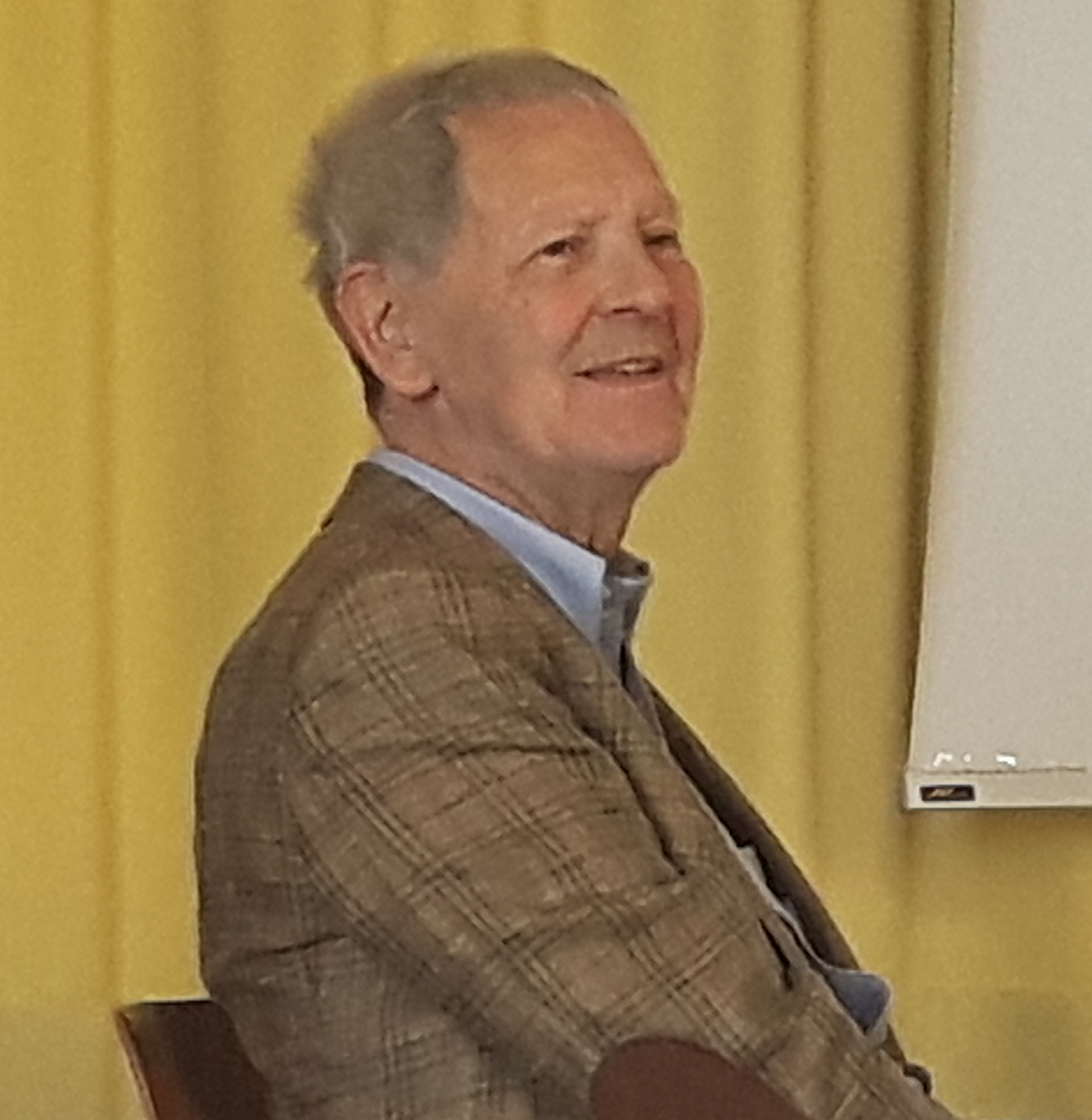
- Born: June 5, 1946; Zurich, Switzerland
- Occupations: Founder and Director of the Product-Life Institute Geneva, former Director of the risk management programme at The Geneva Association
- Awards: The Product-Life Factor (Mitchell Prize-winning paper) 1982, unemployment, occupation and profession (German Future's Society) 1978
- Buildings: Paddington Maintenance Depot (PMD) London
- Website: Product-Life Institute

Walter R. Stahel (born June 5, 1946) is a Swiss architect, graduating from the Swiss Federal Institute of Technology Zürich in 1971. He has been influential in developing the field of sustainability, by advocating 'service-life extension of goods - reuse, refill, reprogram, repair, remanufacture, upgrade technologically' philosophies as they apply to industrialised economies. He co-founded the Product Life Institute in Geneva, Switzerland, a consultancy devoted to developing sustainable strategies and policies, after receiving recognition for his prize-winning paper 'The Product Life Factor' in 1982. His ideas and those of similar theorists led to what is now known as the circular economy in which industry adopts the reuse and service-life extension of goods as a strategy of waste prevention, regional job creation and resource efficiency in order to decouple wealth from resource consumption, that is to dematerialise the industrial economy. The circular economy has been adopted as a guiding philosophy by China's state-owned coal industry. In the 1990s, Stahel extended this vision to selling goods as services as the most efficient strategy of the circular economy. He described this approach in his 2006 book The Performance Economy, with a second enlarged edition in 2010 which contains 300 examples and case studies. He currently works closely with the Ellen MacArthur Foundation on further promoting his ideas with economic actors.

In 2005, Stahel was nominated as member of the "Consumer Commission" of Ministerpräsident (PM) Oettinger, head of the Government of Baden-Wuerttemberg, Germany, and heads its section on sustainable development. In 2007 he was appointed to the editorial board of the Chinese Journal of Population, Resources and Environment. Stahel has been serving in a number of functions for the European Commission. From 1988 to 2014, he was head of risk management research of The Geneva Association, a think tank of the world insurance industry.

In 2005, Stahel was nominated visiting professor at the Faculty of Engineering and Physical Sciences of the University of Surrey at Guildford. On 1 November 2012, he was awarded the honorary degree of Doctor of the University (DUniv) by the same university. Later in November 2012, Stahel was nominated Full Member of the Club of Rome, based in Winterthur. In 2016, he was nominated as the first visiting professor of Institut EDDEC (Environnement, Développement Durable et Economie Circulaire), a joint academic institution of Université, HEC and Polytechnique de Montréal. On 3 May 2016, he was awarded a doctorate honoris causa by the Université de Montréal.

Since 2015, Stahel has been active as keynote speaker, author and mentor. In 2020, Stahel was nominated senior research fellow at the Circular Economy Research Centre of the École des Ponts Business School in Paris.

Stahel was awarded the Thornton Medal 2020 of IOM3 jointly with James Blake GBS OBE JP CEng FICE FIStructE HonFHKIE.

== Substituting manpower for energy, 1976 ==
Stahel and Genevieve Reday's 1976 report Potential for Substitution Manpower for Energy for Commission of the European Communities (today the European Commission) essentially put the argument of extending the service-life of buildings and such goods as cars and highlighted the waste inherent in disposing of old products instead of repairing them. The report was published in 1982 as a book Jobs for Tomorrow, the Potential for Substituting Manpower for Energy.

== The Product-Life Factor, 1982 ==
In 1982, Stahel won a Mitchell Prize for his paper “The Product-Life Factor” describing the closed loop economy, now referred to as the circular economy. Stahel's paper suggested extension of the use-life of goods was a sensible point at which to start a gradual transition towards a sustainable society. He argued extending product-life optimizes the total life-span of goods and reduces depletion of natural resources and consequently waste.

== The Product Life Institute, 1982 ==
Also in 1982 Stahel, with Giarini, founded the Product-Life Institute to develop practical strategies for economic growth with lower resource consumption. The Product-Life Institute is a not-for-profit organization in Geneva, Switzerland. The Institute promotes what has become known as the loop or circular economy, the key attributes being product-life extension, long-life goods, reconditioning activities and therefore waste minimisation. The Institute argues a sustainable economy and society recognizes the primacy of ecosystem services provided by the natural environment. This position inherently opposes any form of pollution.

== The Limits to Certainty, 1989 ==
The Limits to Certainty by Orio Giarini and Walter R. Stahel is a 1989 follow-up to a report published by the Club of Rome in 1980, Dialogue on Wealth and Welfare, in which it was proposed the generally recognised limits to growth such as finite raw materials were the limits of a specific type of economic growth, a linear rather than circular industrial economy. Stahel advocates making a better use of resources during the utilization of goods and proposes a new type of economic growth taking into account ecological factors. Updates in the 1993 edition arise mainly from work done at the Product Life Institute founded by Orio Giarini and Walter R. Stahel in Geneva in 1982.

== The Geneva Association, 1986 to 2014 ==
Since 1986, Stahel has been in charge of The Geneva Association's research programme on risk management and responsible for the M.O.R.E. seminar series (Managing Risk in the Economy). In 2012 he was vice-secretary general and director of risk management research, visiting professor at the Faculty of Engineering and Physical Sciences, University of Surrey; and guest lecturer at Tohoku University, Japan, on business models for sustainable development. In June 2008, Stahel took charge of The Geneva Association's Climate Change and Insurance Project. End of December 2014, Stahel retired from the Geneva Association to focus on his activities promoting the circular economy and performance economy, through lectures and publications, as director of the Product-Life Institute, Geneva.

== Publications ==
Publications include The Performance Economy, 2006, published by Palgrave Macmillan, London (a second revised and enlarged edition was published in March 2010), The Limits to Certainty, Facing Risk in the New Service Economy, 1989/92, Kluwer Academic Publishers, Dordrecht (co-author Orio Giarini); a number of book chapters in edited volumes and several research reports available on the websites of both The Geneva Association and The Product Life Institute.

In 2019, he published The Circular Economy: A user's guide by Routledge ISBN 978-0-367-20017-6, translated into Italian, Spanish, Norwegian, Romanian. .

== See also ==
- Cradle to Cradle
- Sustainability
- Regenerative (design)
- Industrial ecology
