= BlueCity =

Coordinates: 51.919799°N 4.501538°E

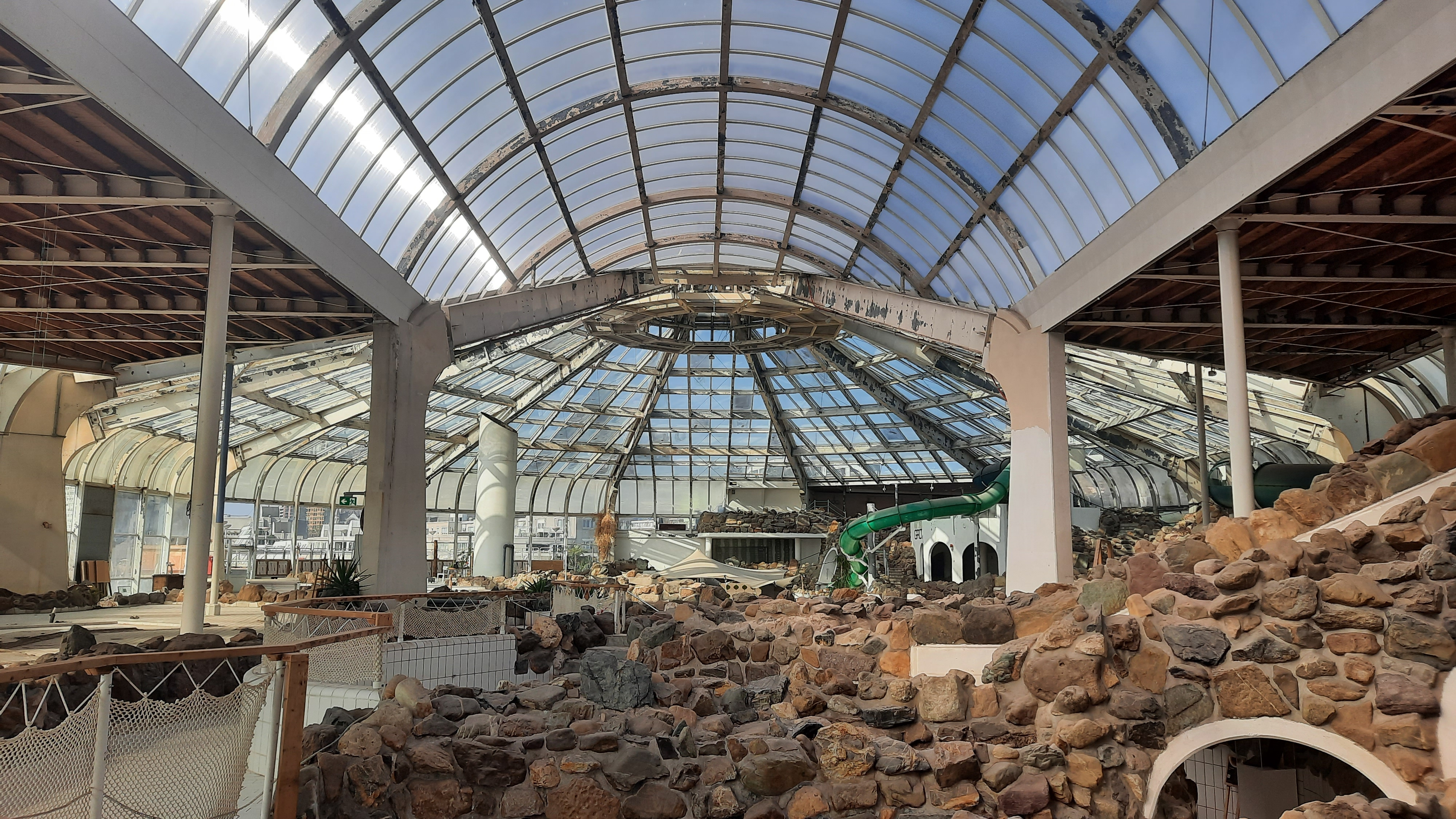
BlueCity in 2022

BlueCity is a platform for the circular economy located in former Center Parcs site Tropicana, Rotterdam. It is home to a collective of small businesses operating within a zero waste circular economy, influenced by the Blue Economy. BlueCity was founded in 2015, when the old Tropicana swimming pool was bought at public auction for €1.7 m in 2015. BlueCity is home to more than 40 entrepreneurs who rent a workspace or work in the BlueCity Lab. It is also possible for individuals to rent a workplace in the building.
