= Sustainable architecture =

Architecture designed to minimize environmental impact

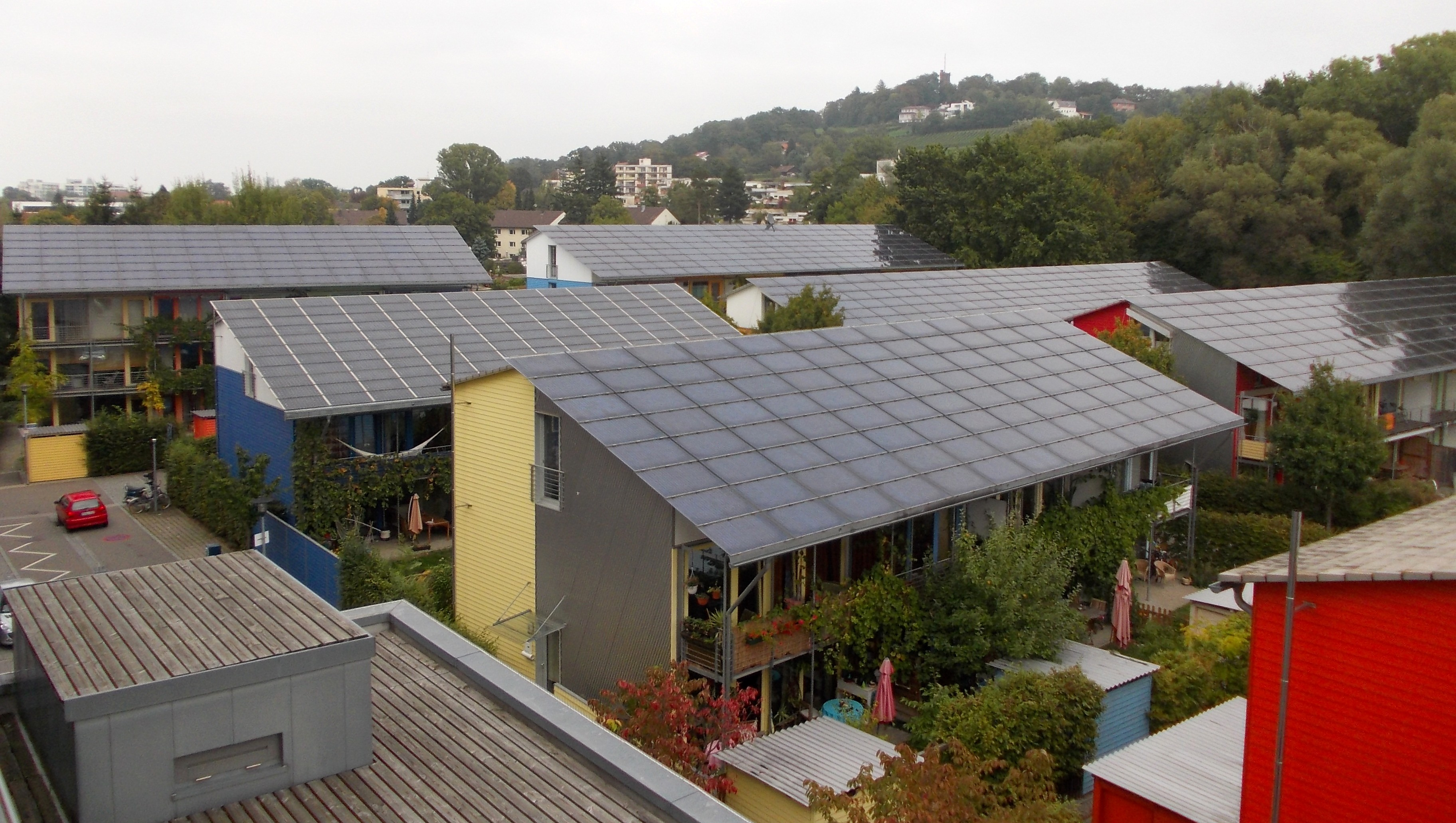
Energy-plus-houses at Freiburg-Vauban in Germany

Sustainable architecture is a branch of architecture that focuses on the design and construction of buildings according to environmental sustainability criteria, with the aim of minimizing their negative environmental impact by enhancing efficiency, reducing material and energy consumption, and minimizing the disturbance to the surrounding ecosystem. Sometimes, sustainable architecture may also focus on the social aspect of sustainability. Social sustainability concerns sustainable handling the everyday positive and negatives of running a business. This includes the impacts that the negatives and positives have on each individual. architecture relies on social sustainability to guide the topic towards its true goal. Sustainable architecture uses a conscious approach to energy and ecological conservation in the design of the built environment.

The concept of sustainability, or ecological design, ensures that the use of current resources does not adversely affect future society's well-being or render it impossible to obtain resources for other uses in the long term.

== Background ==
=== Shift from narrow to broader approach ===
The term "sustainability" in relation to architecture has so far been mostly considered through the lens of building technology and its transformations. Going beyond the technical sphere of "green design", invention and expertise, some scholars are starting to position architecture within a much broader cultural framework of the human interrelationship with nature. Adopting this framework allows for tracing a rich history of cultural debates about humanity's relationship to nature and the environment, from the point of view of different historical and geographical contexts.

=== Changing pedagogues ===
Critics of the reductionism of modernism often noted the abandonment of the teaching of architectural history as a causal factor. The fact that a number of the major players in the deviation from modernism were trained at Princeton University's School of Architecture, where recourse to history continued to be a part of design training in the 1940s and 1950s, was significant.

The increasing rise of interest in history had a profound impact on architectural education. History courses became more typical and regularized. With the demand for professors knowledgeable in the history of architecture, several PhD programs in schools of architecture arose in order to differentiate themselves from art history PhD programs, where architectural historians had previously trained. In the US, MIT and Cornell were the first, created in the mid-1970s, followed by Columbia, Berkeley, and Princeton. Among the founders of new architectural history programs were Bruno Zevi at the Institute for the History of Architecture in Venice, Stanford Anderson and Henry Millon at MIT, Alexander Tzonis at the Architectural Association, Anthony Vidler at Princeton, Manfredo Tafuri at the University of Venice, Kenneth Frampton at Columbia University, and Werner Oechslin and Kurt Forster at ETH Zürich.

=== Operational carbon vs embodied carbon ===
Global construction accounts for 38% of total global emissions. While sustainable architecture and construction standards have traditionally focused on reducing operational carbon emissions, there are to date few standards or systems in place to track and reduce embodied carbon. While steel and other materials are responsible for large-scale emissions, cement alone is responsible for 8% of all emissions.

Recent research identifies carbon capture, alternative cementitious materials, 3D printing, and policy instruments such as carbon pricing as viable strategies to cut cement's embodied carbon emissions.

== Sustainable energy use ==
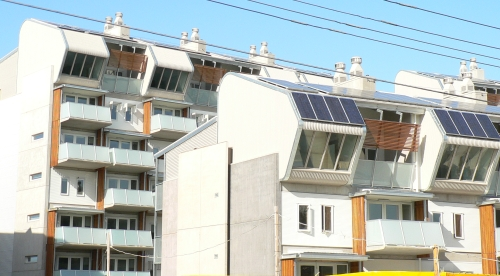
K2 sustainable apartments in Windsor, Victoria, Australia by DesignInc (2006) features passive solar design, recycled and sustainable materials, photovoltaic cells, wastewater treatment, rainwater collection and solar hot water.

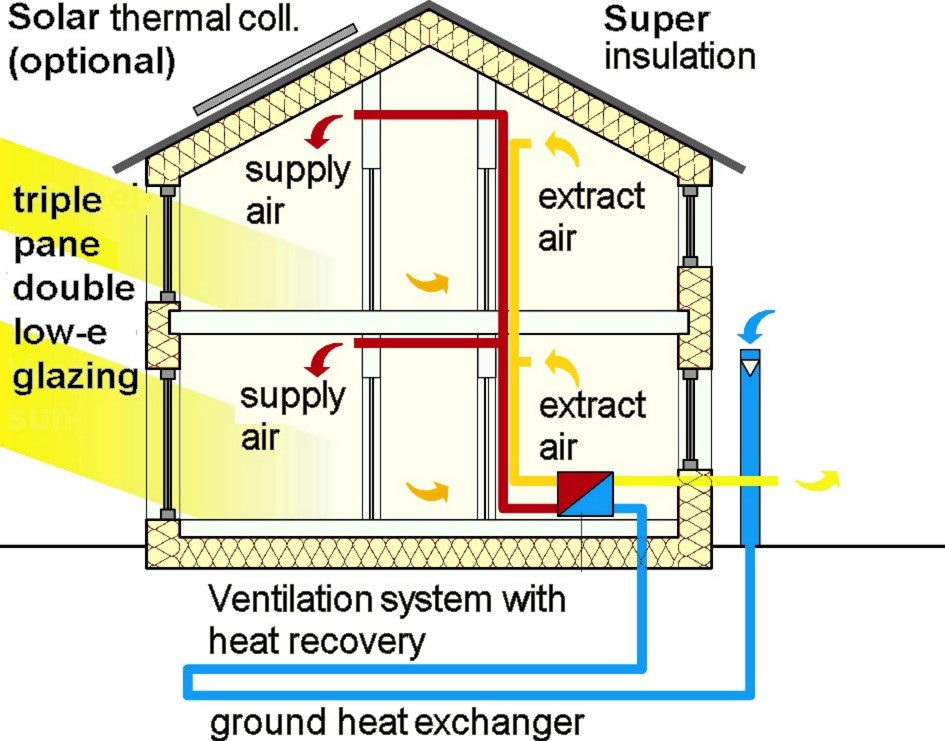
The passivhaus standard combines a variety of techniques and technologies to achieve ultra-low energy use.

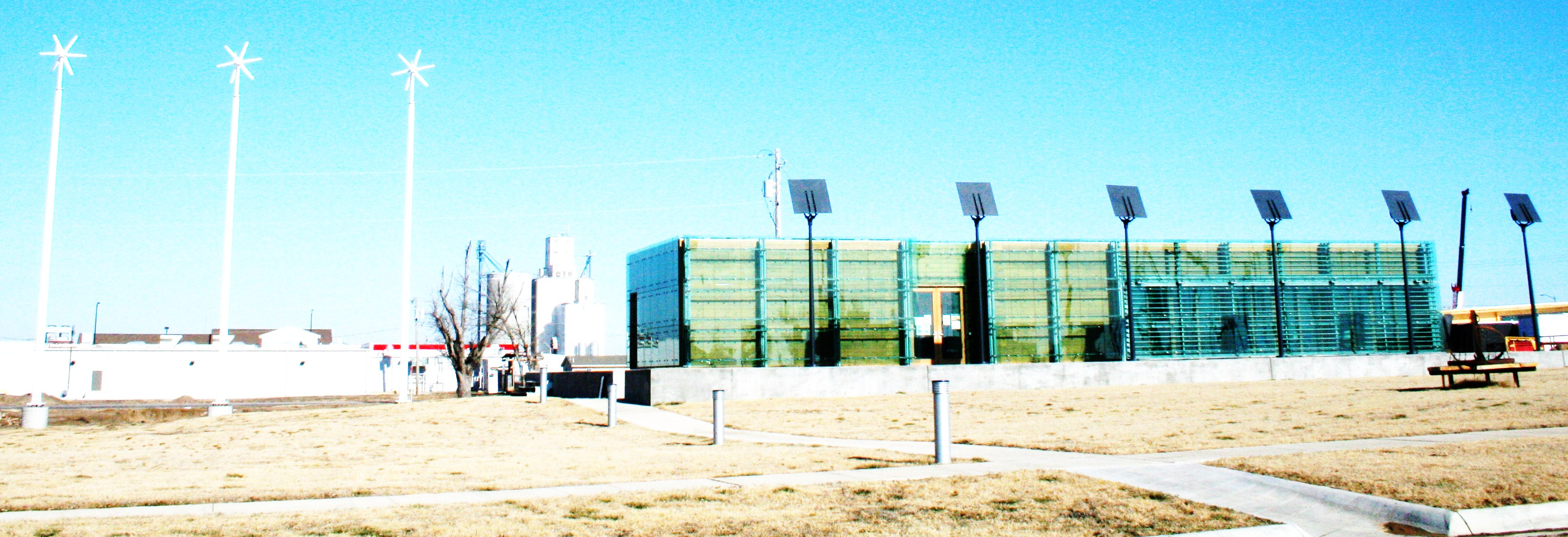
Following its destruction by a tornado in 2007, the town of Greensburg, Kansas (United States) elected to rebuild to highly stringent LEED Platinum environmental standards. Shown is the town's new art center, which integrates its own solar panels and wind generators for energy self-sufficiency.

Energy efficiency over the entire life cycle of a building is a primary goal of sustainable architecture. Architects use many different passive and active techniques to reduce the energy needs of buildings and increase their ability to capture or generate their own energy. To minimize cost and complexity, sustainable architecture prioritizes passive systems to take advantage of building location with incorporated architectural elements, supplementing with renewable energy sources and then fossil fuel resources only as needed. Site analysis can be employed to optimize use of local environmental resources such as daylight and ambient wind for heating and ventilation.

Energy use very often depends on whether the building is on-grid or off-grid. Off-grid buildings do not use energy provided by utility services and instead have their own independent energy production. They use on-site electricity storage while on-grid sites feed in excessive electricity back to the grid.

=== Heating, ventilation and cooling system efficiency ===
Numerous passive architectural strategies have been developed over time. Examples of such strategies include the arrangement of rooms or the sizing and orientation of windows in a building, and the orientation of facades and streets or the ratio between building heights and street widths for urban planning.

An important and cost-effective element of an efficient heating, ventilation, and air conditioning (HVAC) system is a well-insulated building. A more efficient building requires less heat generating or dissipating power, but may require more ventilation capacity to expel polluted indoor air.

Significant amounts of energy are flushed out of buildings in the water, air and compost streams. Off the shelf, on-site energy recycling technologies can effectively recapture energy from waste hot water and stale air and transfer that energy into incoming fresh cold water or fresh air. Recapture of energy for uses other than gardening from compost leaving buildings requires centralized anaerobic digesters.

HVAC systems are powered by motors. Copper, versus other metal conductors, helps to improve the electrical energy efficiencies of motors, thereby enhancing the sustainability of electrical building components.

Site and building orientation have some major effects on a building's HVAC efficiency.

Passive solar building design allows buildings to harness the energy of the sun efficiently without the use of any active solar mechanisms such as photovoltaic cells or solar hot water panels. Typically, passive solar building designs incorporate materials with high thermal mass that retain heat effectively and strong insulation that works to prevent heat escape. Low energy designs also require the use of solar shading, by means of awnings, blinds or shutters, to reduce the solar heat gain in summer and to reduce the need for artificial cooling.

In addition, low energy buildings typically have a very low surface area to volume ratio to minimize heat loss. This means that sprawling multi-winged building designs (sometimes thought to look more "organic") are generally avoided in favor of more centralized structures. Traditional cold climate buildings such as American colonial saltbox designs provide a good historical model for centralized heat efficiency in a small-scale building.

Windows are placed to maximize the input of heat-creating light while minimizing the loss of heat through glass, a poor insulator. In the northern hemisphere this usually involves installing a large number of south-facing windows to collect direct sun and severely restricting the number of north-facing windows. Certain window types, such as double or triple glazed insulated windows with gas filled spaces and low emissivity (low-E) coatings, provide much better insulation than single-pane glass windows.

Preventing excess solar gain by means of solar shading devices in the summer months is important to reduce cooling needs. Deciduous trees are often planted in front of windows to block excessive sun in summer with their leaves but allow light through in winter when their leaves fall off. Louvers or light shelves are installed to allow the sunlight in during the winter (when the sun is lower in the sky) and keep it out in the summer (when the sun is high in the sky). They are slatted like shutters and reflect light and radiation to reduce glare on the interior space. Advanced louver systems are automated to maximize daylight and monitor the interior temperature by adjusting their tilt. Coniferous or evergreen plants are often planted to the north of buildings to shield against cold north winds.

In colder climates, heating systems are a primary focus for sustainable architecture because they are typically one of the largest single energy drains in buildings.

In warmer climates where cooling is a primary concern, passive solar designs can also be very effective. Masonry building materials with high thermal mass are very valuable for retaining the cool temperatures of night throughout the day. In addition builders often opt for sprawling single story structures in order to maximize surface area and heat loss. Buildings are often designed to capture and channel existing winds, particularly the especially cool winds coming from nearby bodies of water. Many of these valuable strategies are employed in some way by the traditional architecture of warm regions, such as south-western mission buildings.

In climates with four seasons, an integrated energy system will increase in efficiency: when the building is well insulated, when it is sited to work with the forces of nature, when heat is recaptured (to be used immediately or stored), when the heat plant relying on fossil fuels or electricity is greater than 100% efficient, and when renewable energy is used.

=== Renewable energy generation ===
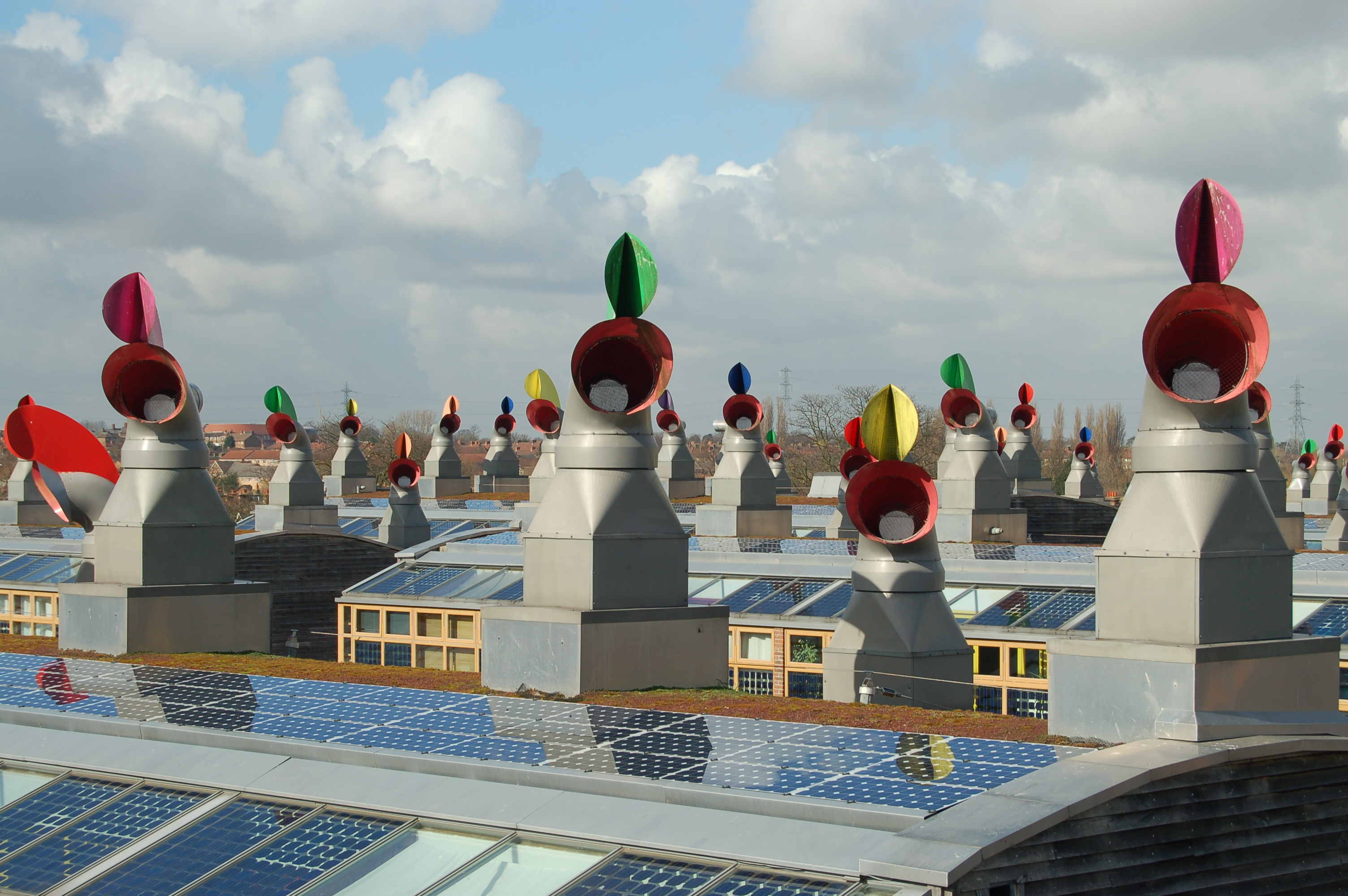
BedZED (Beddington Zero Energy Development), the UK's largest and first carbon-neutral eco-community: the distinctive roofscape with solar panels and passive ventilation chimneys

==== Solar panels ====
Active solar devices such as photovoltaic solar panels help to provide sustainable electricity for any use. Electrical output of a solar panel is dependent on orientation, efficiency, latitude, and climate—solar gain varies even at the same latitude. Typical efficiencies for commercially available PV panels range from 4% to 28%. The low efficiency of certain photovoltaic panels can significantly affect the payback period of their installation. This low efficiency does not mean that solar panels are not a viable energy alternative. In Germany, for example, solar panels are commonly installed in residential home construction.

Roofs are often angled toward the sun to allow photovoltaic panels to collect at maximum efficiency. In the northern hemisphere, a true-south facing orientation maximizes yield for solar panels. If true-south is not possible, solar panels can produce adequate energy if aligned within 30° of south. However, at higher latitudes, winter energy yield will be significantly reduced for non-south orientation.

To maximize efficiency in winter, the collector can be angled above horizontal Latitude +15°. To maximize efficiency in summer, the angle should be Latitude -15°. However, for an annual maximum production, the angle of the panel above horizontal should be equal to its latitude.

==== Wind turbines ====
The use of undersized wind turbines in energy production in sustainable structures requires the consideration of many factors. In considering costs, small wind systems are generally more expensive than larger wind turbines relative to the amount of energy they produce. For small wind turbines, maintenance costs can be a deciding factor at sites with marginal wind-harnessing capabilities. At low-wind sites, maintenance can consume much of a small wind turbine's revenue. Wind turbines begin operating when winds reach 8 mph, achieve energy production capacity at speeds of 32-37 mph, and shut off to avoid damage at speeds exceeding 55 mph.

The energy potential of a wind turbine is proportional to the square of the length of its blades and to the cube of the speed at which its blades spin. Though wind turbines are available that can supplement power for a single building, because of these factors, the efficiency of the wind turbine depends much upon the wind conditions at the building site. For these reasons, for wind turbines to be at all efficient, they must be installed at locations that are known to receive a constant amount of wind (with average wind speeds of more than 15 mph), rather than locations that receive wind sporadically. A small wind turbine can be installed on a roof. Installation issues then include the strength of the roof, vibration, and the turbulence caused by the roof ledge. Small-scale rooftop wind turbines have been known to be able to generate power from 10% to up to 25% of the electricity required of a regular domestic household dwelling. Turbines for residential scale use are usually between 7 feet (2 m) to 25 feet (8 m) in diameter and produce electricity at a rate of 900 watts to 10,000 watts at their tested wind speed.

The reliability of wind turbine systems is important to the success of a wind energy project. Unanticipated breakdowns can have a significant impact on a project's profitability due to the logistical and practical difficulties of replacing critical components in a wind turbine. Uncertainty with the long-term component reliability has a direct impact on the amount of confidence associated with cost of energy (COE) estimates.

==== Solar water heating ====
Solar water heaters, also called solar domestic hot water systems, can be a cost-effective way to generate hot water for a home. They can be used in any climate, and the fuel they use—sunshine—is free.

There are two types of solar water systems: active and passive. An active solar collector system can produce about 80 to 100 gallons of hot water per day. A passive system will have a lower capacity. Active solar water system's efficiency is 35–80% while a passive system is 30–50%, making active solar systems more powerful.

There are also two types of circulation, direct circulation systems and indirect circulation systems. Direct circulation systems loop the domestic water through the panels. They should not be used in climates with temperatures below freezing. Indirect circulation loops glycol or some other fluid through the solar panels and uses a heat exchanger to heat up the domestic water.

The two most common types of collector panels are flat-plate and evacuated-tube. The two work similarly except that evacuated tubes do not convectively lose heat, which greatly improves their efficiency (5%–25% more efficient). With these higher efficiencies, Evacuated-tube solar collectors can also produce higher-temperature space heating, and even higher temperatures for absorption cooling systems.

Electric-resistance water heaters that are common in homes today have an electrical demand around 4500 kW·h/year. With the use of solar collectors, the energy use is cut in half. The up-front cost of installing solar collectors is high, but with the annual energy savings, payback periods are relatively short.

==== Heat pumps ====
Air source heat pumps (ASHP) can be thought of as reversible air conditioners. Like an air conditioner, an ASHP can take heat from a relatively cool space (e.g. a house at 70 °F) and dump it into a hot place (e.g. outside at 85 °F). However, unlike an air conditioner, the condenser and evaporator of an ASHP can switch roles and absorb heat from the cool outside air and dump it into a warm house.

Air-source heat pumps are inexpensive relative to other heat pump systems. As the efficiency of air-source heat pumps decline when the outdoor temperature is very cold or very hot; therefore, they are most efficiently used in temperate climates. However, contrary to earlier expectations, they have proven to be also well suited for regions with cold outdoor temperatures, such as Scandinavia or Alaska. In Norway, Finland and Sweden, the use of heat pumps has grown strongly over the last two decades: in 2019, there were 15–25 heat pumps per 100 inhabitants in these countries, with ASHP the dominant heat pump technology. Similarly, earlier assumptions that ASHP would only work well in fully insulated buildings have proven wrong—even old, partially insulated buildings can be retrofitted with ASHPs and thereby strongly reduce their energy demand.

Effects of EAHPs (exhaust air heat pumps) have also been studied within the aforementioned regions displaying promising results. An exhaust air heat pump uses electricity to extract heat from exhaust air leaving a building, redirecting it towards DHW (domestic hot water), space heating, and warming supply air. In colder countries, an EAHP may be able to recover around 2 - 3 times more energy than an air-to-air exchange system. A 2022 study surrounding projected emission decreases within Sweden's Kymenlaakso region explored the aspect of retrofitting existing apartment buildings (of varying ages) with EAHP systems. Select buildings were chosen in the cities of Kotka and Kouvola, their projected carbon emissions decreasing by about 590 tCO2 and 944 tCO2 respectively with a 7 - 13 year payoff period. It is, however, important to note that EAHP systems may not produce favourable results if installed in a building exhibiting incompatible exhaust output rates or electricity consumption. In this case, EAHP systems may increase energy bills without providing reasonable cuts to carbon emissions (see EAHP).

Ground-source (or geothermal) heat pumps provide an efficient alternative. The difference between the two heat pumps is that the ground-source has one of its heat exchangers placed underground—usually in a horizontal or vertical arrangement. Ground-source takes advantage of the relatively constant, mild temperatures underground, which means their efficiencies can be much greater than that of an air-source heat pump. The in-ground heat exchanger generally needs a considerable amount of area. Designers have placed them in an open area next to the building or underneath a parking lot.

Energy Star ground-source heat pumps can be 40% to 60% more efficient than their air-source counterparts. They are also quieter and can also be applied to other functions like domestic hot water heating.

In terms of initial cost, the ground-source heat pump system costs about twice as much as a standard air-source heat pump to be installed. However, the up-front costs can be more than offset by the decrease in energy costs. The reduction in energy costs is especially apparent in areas with typically hot summers and cold winters.

Other types of heat pumps are water-source and air-earth. If the building is located near a body of water, the pond or lake could be used as a heat source or sink. Air-earth heat pumps circulate the building's air through underground ducts. With higher fan power requirements and inefficient heat transfer, Air-earth heat pumps are generally not practical for major construction.

==== Passive daytime radiative cooling ====
Passive daytime radiative cooling harvests the extreme coldness of outer space as a renewable energy source to achieve daytime cooling. Being high in solar reflectance to reduce solar heat gain and strong in longwave infrared (LWIR) thermal radiation heat transfer, daytime radiative cooling surfaces can achieve sub-ambient cooling for indoor and outdoor spaces when applied to roofs, which can significantly lower energy demand and costs devoted to cooling. These cooling surfaces can be applied as sky-facing panels, similar to other renewable energy sources like solar energy panels, making them for simple integration into architectural design.

A passive daytime radiative cooling roof application can double the energy savings of a white roof, and when applied as a multilayer surface to 10% of a building's roof, it can replace 35% of air conditioning used during the hottest hours of daytime. Daytime radiative cooling applications for indoor space cooling is growing with an estimated "market size of ~$27 billion in 2025."

== Sustainable building materials ==
Some examples of sustainable building materials include recycled denim or blown-in fiber glass insulation, sustainably harvested wood, Trass, Linoleum, sheep wool, hempcrete, roman concrete, panels made from paper flakes, baked earth, rammed earth, clay, mycelium insulation, vermiculite, flax linen, sisal, seagrass, expanded clay grains, coconut, wood fiber plates, calcium sandstone, locally obtained stone and rock, and bamboo, which is one of the strongest and fastest growing woody plants, and non-toxic low-VOC glues and paints. Bamboo flooring can be useful in ecological spaces since they help reduce pollution particles in the air. Vegetative cover or shield over building envelopes also helps in the same. Paper which is fabricated or manufactured out of forest wood is supposedly one hundred percent recyclable, thus it regenerates and saves almost all the forest wood that it takes during its manufacturing process. There is an underutilized potential for systematically storing carbon in the built environment.A 2024 study of a residential building in Myanmar found that using low-carbon construction materials reduced material-related carbon emissions by approximately 40% and transportation-related emissions by 39%, although construction costs increased by 6.7%.

=== Natural products ===
The use of natural building materials for their sustainable qualities is a practice seen in vernacular architecture. Regional architectural styles develop over generations, utilizing local materials. This practice reduces transportation and production emissions. Regenerative sources, use of waste material, and the ability to reuse are sustainable qualities of timber, thatching, and stone and clay. Laminated timber products, straw, and stone are low carbon construction materials with major potential for scalability. Timber products can sequester carbon, while stone has a low extraction energy. Straw, including straw-bale construction, sequesters carbon while providing a high level of insulation. High thermal performance of natural materials contribute to regulating interior conditions without the use of modern technologies.

The uses of timber, straw, and stone in sustainable architecture were the subject of a major exhibit at the UK's Design Museum.

=== Recycled materials ===
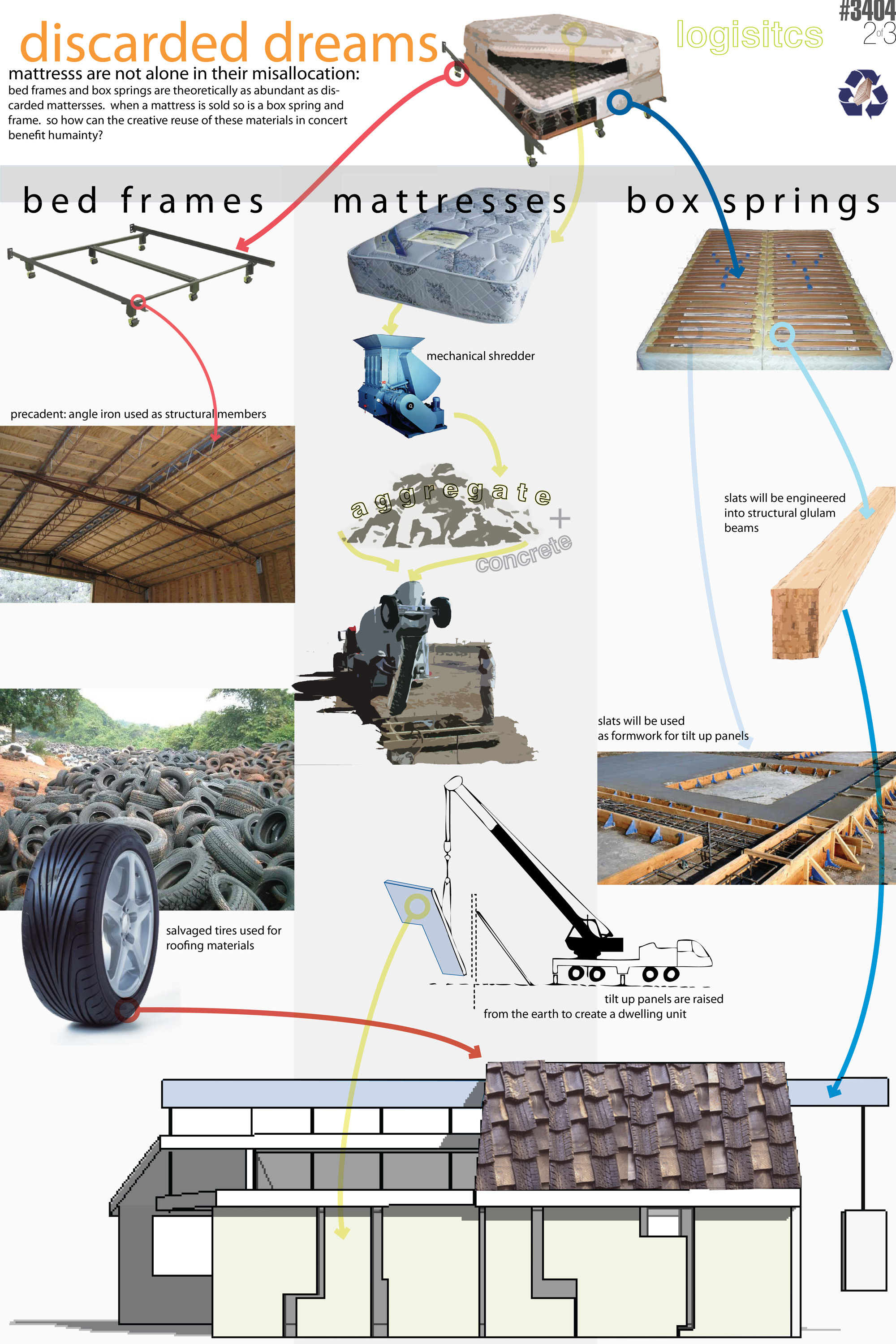
Discarded Dreams Competition entry from 2008 by Ralph Spencer Steenblik and Aaron Legendre highlighting recycling items for building

Sustainable architecture often incorporates the use of recycled or second hand materials, such as reclaimed lumber and recycled copper. The reduction in use of new materials creates a corresponding reduction in embodied energy (energy used in the production of materials). Often sustainable architects attempt to retrofit old structures to serve new needs in order to avoid unnecessary development. Architectural salvage and reclaimed materials are used when appropriate.When older buildings are demolished, frequently any good wood is reclaimed, renewed, and sold as flooring. Any good dimension stone is similarly reclaimed. Many other parts are reused as well, such as doors, windows, mantels, and hardware, thus reducing the consumption of new goods.

When new materials are employed, green designers look for materials that are rapidly replenished, such as bamboo, which can be harvested for commercial use after only six years of growth, sorghum or wheat straw, both of which are waste material that can be pressed into panels, or cork oak, in which only the outer bark is removed for use, thus preserving the tree. When possible, building materials may be gleaned from the site itself; for example, if a new structure is being constructed in a wooded area, wood from the trees which were cut to make room for the building would be re-used as part of the building itself.

For insulation in building envelopes, more experimental materials such as "waste sheep's wool" alongside other waste fibers originating from textile and agri-industrial operations are being researched for use as well, with recent studies suggesting the recycled insulation effective for architectural purposes.

=== Lower volatile organic compounds ===
Low-impact building materials are used wherever feasible: for example, insulation may be made from low VOC (volatile organic compound)-emitting materials such as recycled denim or cellulose insulation, rather than the building insulation materials that may contain carcinogenic or toxic materials such as formaldehyde. To discourage insect damage, these alternate insulation materials may be treated with boric acid. Organic or milk-based paints may be used. However, a common fallacy is that "green" materials are always better for the health of occupants or the environment. Many harmful substances (including formaldehyde, arsenic, and asbestos) are naturally occurring and are not without their histories of use with the best of intentions. A study of emissions from materials by the State of California has shown that there are some green materials that have substantial emissions whereas some more "traditional" materials actually were lower emitters. Thus, the subject of emissions must be carefully investigated before concluding that natural materials are always the healthiest alternatives for occupants and for the Earth.

Volatile organic compounds (VOC) can be found in any indoor environment coming from a variety of different sources. VOCs have a high vapor pressure and low water solubility, and are suspected of causing sick building syndrome type symptoms. This is because many VOCs have been known to cause sensory irritation and central nervous system symptoms characteristic to sick building syndrome, indoor concentrations of VOCs are higher than in the outdoor atmosphere, and when there are many VOCs present, they can cause additive and multiplicative effects.

Green products are usually considered to contain fewer VOCs and be better for human and environmental health. A case study conducted by the Department of Civil, Architectural, and Environmental Engineering at the University of Miami that compared three green products and their non-green counterparts found that even though both the green products and the non-green counterparts both emitted levels of VOCs, the amount and intensity of the VOCs emitted from the green products were much safer and comfortable for human exposure.

=== Lab-grown organic materials ===
Commonly used building materials such as wood require deforestation that is, without proper care, unsustainable. As of October 2022, researchers at MIT have made developments on lab-grown Zinnia elegans cells growing into specific characteristics under conditions within their control. These characteristics include the "shape, thickness, [and] stiffness," as well as mechanical properties that can mimic wood. David N. Bengston from the USDA suggests that this alternative would be more efficient than traditional wood harvesting, with future developments potentially saving on transportation energy and conserve forests. However, Bengston notes that this breakthrough would change paradigms and raises new economic and environmental questions, such as timber-dependent communities′ jobs or how conservation would impact wildfires.

=== Materials sustainability standards ===
Despite the importance of materials to overall building sustainability, quantifying and evaluating the sustainability of building materials has proven difficult. There is little coherence in the measurement and assessment of materials sustainability attributes, resulting in a landscape today that is littered with hundreds of competing, inconsistent and often imprecise eco-labels, standards and certifications. This discord has led both to confusion among consumers and commercial purchasers and to the incorporation of inconsistent sustainability criteria in larger building certification programs such as LEED. Various proposals have been made regarding rationalization of the standardization landscape for sustainable building materials.

== Sustainable design and plan ==
=== Building ===
==== Building information modelling ====
Building information modelling (BIM) is used to help enable sustainable design by allowing architects and engineers to integrate and analyze building performance.[5]. BIM services, including conceptual and topographic modelling, offer a new channel to green building with successive and immediate availability of internally coherent, and trustworthy project information. BIM enables designers to quantify the environmental impacts of systems and materials to support the decisions needed to design sustainable buildings.

==== Consulting ====
A sustainable building consultant may be engaged early in the design process, to forecast the sustainability implications of building materials, orientation, glazing and other physical factors, so as to identify a sustainable approach that meets the specific requirements of a project.

Norms and standards have been formalized by performance-based rating systems e.g. LEED and Energy Star for homes. They define benchmarks to be met and provide metrics and testing to meet those benchmarks. It is up to the parties involved in the project to determine the best approach to meet those standards.

==== Building placement ====
One central and often ignored aspect of sustainable architecture is building placement. Although the ideal environmental home or office structure is often envisioned as an isolated place, this kind of placement is usually detrimental to the environment. First, such structures often serve as the unknowing frontlines of suburban sprawl. Second, they usually increase the energy consumption required for transportation and lead to unnecessary auto emissions. Ideally, most building should avoid suburban sprawl in favor of the kind of light urban development articulated by the New Urbanist movement. Careful mixed use zoning can make commercial, residential, and light industrial areas more accessible for those traveling by foot, bicycle, or public transit, as proposed in the Principles of Intelligent Urbanism. The study of permaculture, in its holistic application, can also greatly help in proper building placement that minimizes energy consumption and works with the surroundings rather than against them, especially in rural and forested zones.

==== Water Usage ====
Sustainable buildings look for ways to conserve water. One strategic water saving design green buildings incorporate are green roofs. Green roofs have rooftop vegetation which captures storm drainage water. This function not only collects the water for further uses but also serves as a good insulator that can aid in the urban heat island effect. Another strategic water efficient design is treating wastewater so it can be reused again.

Another sustainable design strategy is the use of rainwater harvesting systems, such as low-flow fixtures. These are widely known in green architecture for reducing water consumption exponentially and supporting long-term resource conservation.

=== Urban design ===
Sustainable urbanism takes actions beyond sustainable architecture, and makes a broader view for sustainability. Typical solutions include eco-industrial park (EIP) and urban agriculture. International programs that are being supported include Sustainable Urban Development Network, supported by UN-HABITAT; and Eco2 Cities, supported by the World Bank.

Concurrently, the recent movements of New Urbanism, New Classical architecture and contemporary Traditional architecture promote a sustainable approach towards construction, that appreciates and develops smart growth, architectural tradition and classical design. This in contrast to modernist and globally uniform architecture, as well as leaning against solitary housing estates and suburban sprawl. Both trends started in the 1980s. The Driehaus Architecture Prize is an award that recognizes efforts in New Urbanism and New Classical architecture, and is endowed with a prize money twice as high as that of the modernist Pritzker Prize.

=== Waste management ===
Waste takes the form of spent or useless materials generated from households and businesses, construction and demolition processes, and manufacturing and agricultural industries. These materials are loosely categorized as municipal solid waste, construction and demolition (C&D) debris, and industrial or agricultural by-products. Sustainable architecture focuses on the on-site use of waste management, incorporating things such as grey water systems for use on garden beds, and composting toilets to reduce sewage. These methods, when combined with on-site food waste composting and off-site recycling, can reduce a house's waste to a small amount of packaging waste.

== See also ==
- Alternative natural materials
- BREEAM
- BrightBuilt Barn
- Contemporary traditional architecture
- Cross-laminated timber (CLT)
- Deconstruction (building)
- Earth embassy
- Earthship
- Ecological design
- Ecological footprint
- Energy-plus-house
- Fab Tree Hab: 100% Ecological Home
- Haute qualité environnementale French standard for green building - HQE
- Land recycling
- Low-energy house
- Organic architecture
- Passive house
- Renewable heat
- Solar architecture
- Solar chimney
- Straw-bale construction
- Superinsulation
- Sustainable city
- Sustainable design
- Sustainable development
- Sustainable flooring
- Sustainable landscape architecture
- Sustainable preservation
- Sustainable refurbishment
- Tasmanian House
- Windcatcher
- World Green Building Council
- Yakhchāl
- Zero-energy building
