= Sustainable design =

Environmentally conscious design

Environmentally sustainable design (also called environmentally conscious design, eco-design and related terms) is an approach to designing products, buildings, landscapes, infrastructure and services so that they reduce environmental impacts while supporting human health, comfort and well-being. It applies ecological sustainability to decisions about materials, energy, water, waste, land use, construction, production and user behaviour.

In the built environment, sustainable design seeks to reduce the consumption of non-renewable resources, minimise waste, improve building performance and create healthy, productive indoor and outdoor environments. It is closely associated with sustainable architecture, sustainable engineering, ecological design, life-cycle assessment, renewable energy, circular economy principles and sustainability assessment systems such as LEED and BREEAM.

The scope of sustainable design extends from individual products and interiors to buildings, infrastructure, cities and landscapes. Contemporary practice increasingly considers not only operational efficiency, but also embodied carbon, resource circularity, biodiversity, climate resilience, social value and long-term economic performance.

== Policy and frameworks ==
Sustainable design concepts are increasingly reflected in policy, regulation and voluntary assessment frameworks. These instruments may address material selection, resource efficiency, environmental health, life-cycle impacts, circularity and the reduction of hazards across product and building life cycles.

For example, the Safe and Sustainable by Design framework has been developed in the context of the European Union's Registration, Evaluation, Authorisation and Restriction of Chemicals (REACH) regulation. It defines protocols for assessing material and chemical properties, including toxicological and physicochemical characteristics, so that hazard and sustainability information can be considered throughout upstream and downstream product life-cycle processes.

== Theory ==
Sustainable design is often described as an attempt to "eliminate negative environmental impact through skilful, sensitive design". In practice, it seeks to reduce resource demand, use renewable resources where appropriate, consider whole-life impacts and connect people more directly with the natural environment.

"Human beings don't have a pollution problem; they have a design problem. If humans were to devise products, tools, furniture, homes, factories, and cities more intelligently from the start, they wouldn't even need to think in terms of waste, contamination, or scarcity. Good design would allow for abundance, endless reuse, and pleasure."

— The Upcycle by authors Michael Braungart and William McDonough, 2013.

Design decisions shape products, services, buildings, infrastructure, business models and innovation strategies. For that reason, design is closely linked to sustainable development and to the capacity of social, economic and ecological systems to continue over time.

=== Conceptual problems ===
==== Diminishing returns ====
The concept of diminishing returns, commonly illustrated by the 'S' curve in the technology life cycle, refers to the reduced incremental benefit gained from continued investment or effort. In fields such as industrial ecology and life cycle assessment, this concept is associated with the finite useful life of systems. Management literature suggests that when traditional approaches reach diminishing returns, it may prompt organisations to reassess their strategy and explore alternative opportunities.

==== Unsustainable investment ====
A problem arises when the limits of a resource are hard to see, and increasing investment in the resources in response to diminishing returns may lead to a collapse. This problem of increasing investment in diminishing resources has been studied as a cause of civilization collapse by Joseph Tainter among others. This natural error in investment policy contributed to the collapse of both the Romans and Mayans, among others. Relieving over-stressed resources requires reducing pressure on them, not continually increasing it whether more efficiently or not.

==== Negative effects of waste ====
Plans for Floriade 2012 in Venlo, the Netherlands: "The Greenest Building in the Netherlands – no external fuel, electricity, water or sewage."

The designer is responsible for choices that place a demand on natural resources, produce waste, and potentially cause irreversible ecosystem damage.

Waste generation is one indicator of the environmental burden created by production and consumption. In the United Kingdom, for example, total waste generation has been reported at about 80 million tonnes per year. Between 1991–92 and 2007–08, each person in England generated an average of 1.35 pounds of household waste per day.

Waste disposal methods can create environmental and public-health impacts if they are poorly designed or managed. Landfills may contaminate soil or water, incinerators may release pollutants if emissions are not controlled, and wastewater-treatment systems can affect local ecology. Sustainable design therefore gives priority to preventing waste before it is generated, rather than relying only on downstream management.

The toxic components of household products pose serious health risks and aggravate the trash problem. In the US, about seven pounds in every ton of household garbage contains toxic materials, such as heavy metals like nickel, lead, cadmium, and mercury from batteries, and organic compounds found in pesticides and consumer products, such as air freshener sprays, nail polish, cleaners, and other products. When burned or buried, toxic materials also pose a serious threat to public health and the environment.

Waste prevention focuses on changing products, processes and behaviours so that pollution is avoided at source. This does not necessarily require doing without a product or service; it may require delivering the same function differently, such as using refillable containers rather than disposable ones.

Industrial designer Victor Papanek has stated that when we design and plan things to be discarded, we exercise insufficient care in design.

==== Waste prevention strategies ====
Facility planning can include strategies for preventing the generation of solid waste. Improper waste disposal is associated with pollution, climate change and hazardous emissions that may affect human wellbeing. A waste-prevention strategy may therefore favour products that can be reused, repaired, composted, anaerobically digested, recycled or safely returned to biological cycles through biodegradation.

Any resource-related development is going to have two basic sources of solid waste: materials purchased and used by the facility and those brought into the facility by visitors. The following waste prevention strategies apply to both, although different approaches will be needed for implementation.

- use products that minimise waste and are non-toxic
- compost or anaerobically digest biodegradable wastes
- reuse materials on-site or collect suitable materials for offsite recycling
- consuming fewer resources means creating less waste, therefore it reduces the impact on the environment.

==== Climate change ====
Climate change is a major driver of environmentally conscious design. Buildings, products and infrastructure influence energy use, material consumption, transport patterns and emissions over long periods. Sustainable design therefore addresses both operational impacts, such as energy use during occupation or operation, and embodied impacts associated with materials, construction, manufacturing and end-of-life processes.

==== Loss of biodiversity ====
Design and planning decisions can affect biodiversity through land conversion, habitat fragmentation, pollution, hydrological change and disturbance to ecological processes. Examples include transport infrastructure that fragments wildlife habitat and dams or water-management systems that alter aquatic ecosystems.

=== Sustainable design principles ===
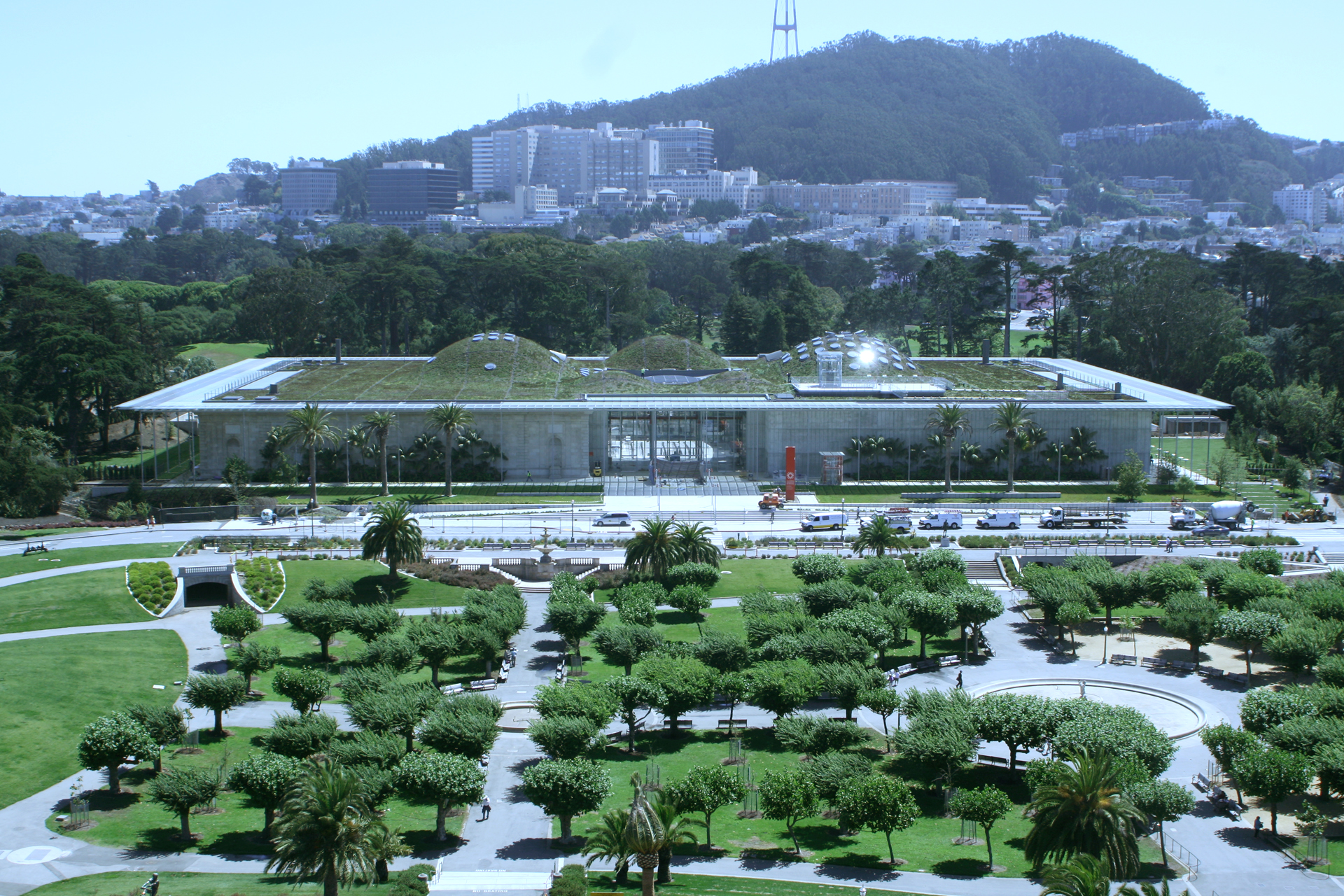
The California Academy of Sciences, San Francisco, California, is a sustainable building designed by Renzo Piano. It opened on September 27, 2008.

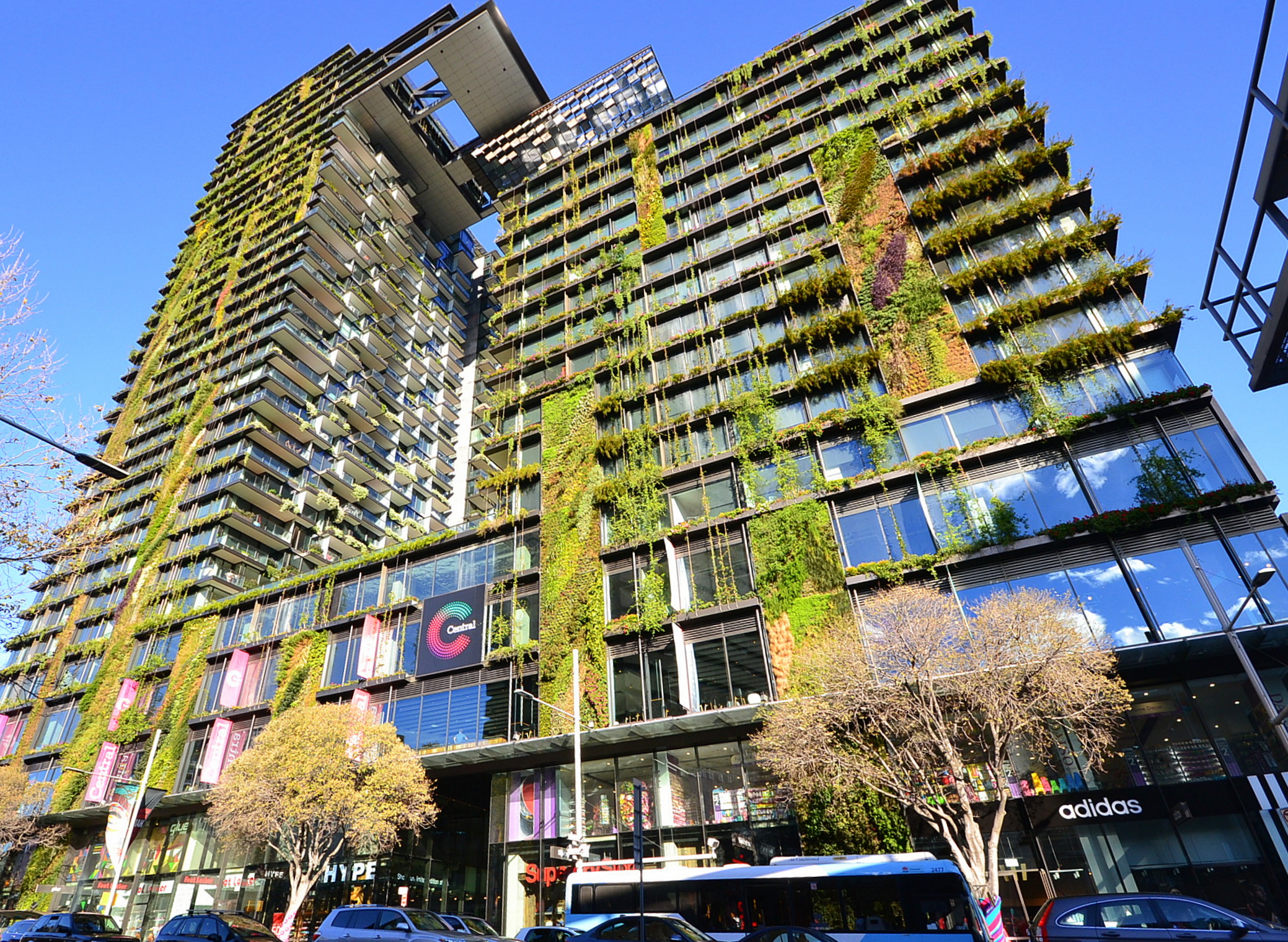
One Central Park, Sydney

While the practical application varies among disciplines, some common principles are as follows:

- Low-impact materials: choose non-toxic, sustainably produced, or recycled materials that require little energy to process
- Energy efficiency: use manufacturing processes and produce products that require less energy
- Emotionally durable design: reducing consumption and waste of resources by increasing the durability of relationships between people and products, through design
- Design for reuse and recycling: "Products, processes, and systems should be designed for performance in a commercial 'afterlife'."
- Targeted durability, not immortality, should be a design goal.
- Material diversity in multicomponent products should be minimised to promote disassembly and value retention.
- Design impact measures, including carbon footprint assessment and life-cycle assessment, are increasingly used to evaluate the impacts of resource use. Some methods estimate impacts by relating expenditure to average global energy use and associated carbon dioxide emissions.
- Biomimicry: "redesigning industrial systems on biological lines ... enabling the constant reuse of materials in continuous closed cycles..."
- Service substitution: shifting the mode of consumption from personal ownership of products to provision of services that provide similar functions, e.g., from a private automobile to a carsharing service. Such a system promotes minimal resource use per unit of consumption (e.g., per trip driven).
- Renewable resource: materials should come from nearby (local or bioregional), sustainably managed renewable sources that can be composted when their usefulness has been exhausted.

Sustainable design standards and project design guides are increasingly available in several design fields.

==== Bill of Rights for the Planet ====
One frequently cited model is the "Bill of Rights for the Planet", also known as the "Hannover Principles", developed by William McDonough Architects for EXPO 2000 in Hannover, Germany.

The Bill of Rights:

1. Insist on the right of humanity and nature to co-exist in healthy, supportive, diverse, and sustainable conditions.
2. Recognize Interdependence. The elements of human design interact with and depend on the natural world, with broad and diverse implications at every scale. Expand design considerations to recognize even distant effects.
3. Respect relationships between spirit and matter. Consider all aspects of human settlement including community, dwelling, industry, and trade in terms of existing and evolving connections between spiritual and material consciousness.
4. Accept responsibility for the consequences of design decisions upon human well-being, the viability of natural systems, and their right to co-exist.
5. Create safe objects of long-term value. Do not burden future generations with requirements for maintenance or vigilant administration of potential danger due to the careless creation of products, processes, or standards.
6. Eliminate the concept of waste. Evaluate and optimise the full life-cycle of products and processes, to approach the state of natural systems in which there is no waste.
7. Rely on natural energy flows. Human designs should, like the living world, derive their creative forces from perpetual solar income. Incorporating this energy efficiently and safely for responsible use.
8. Understand the limitations of design. No human creation lasts forever and design does not solve all problems. Those who create and plan should practice humility in the face of nature. Treat nature as a model and mentor, not an inconvenience to be evaded or controlled.
9. Seek constant improvement by the sharing of knowledge. Encourage direct and open communication between colleagues, patrons, manufacturers, and users to link long-term sustainable considerations with ethical responsibility, and re-establish the integral relationship between natural processes and human activity.

These principles were adopted by the World Congress of the International Union of Architects (UIA) in June 1993 at the American Institute of Architects (AIA) Expo 93 in Chicago. Further, the AIA and UIA signed a "Declaration of Interdependence for a Sustainable Future." In summary, the declaration states that today's society is degrading its environment and that the AIA, UIA, and their members are committed to:

- Placing environmental and social sustainability at the core of practices and professional responsibilities
- Developing and continually improving practices, procedures, products, services, and standards for sustainable design
- Educating the building industry, clients, and the general public about the importance of sustainable design
- Working to change policies, regulations, and standards in government and business so that sustainable design will become the fully supported standard practice
- Bringing the existing built environment up to sustainable design standards.

In addition, the Interprofessional Council on Environmental Design (ICED), a coalition of architectural, landscape architectural, and engineering organisations developed a vision statement in an attempt to foster a team approach to sustainable design. ICED states: The ethics, education, and practices of our professions will be directed to shape a sustainable future. . . . To achieve this vision we will join . . . as a multidisciplinary partnership."

These activities are an indication that the concept of sustainable design is being supported on a global and interprofessional scale and that the ultimate goal is to become more environmentally responsive. The world needs facilities that are more energy-efficient and that promote conservation and recycling of natural and economic resources.

== Economically and socially sustainable design ==
Environmentally sustainable design is often considered alongside economic and social sustainability. Together, these dimensions are commonly described through the triple bottom line of people, planet and profit. In addition to financial value, sustainable design may consider natural capital such as ecosystems and resources, social capital such as networks and institutions, and human capital such as knowledge, skills and labour.

Related terms include ecodesign, green design and environmental design. Victor Papanek addressed social and ecological quality in design, while later usage of sustainable design and design for sustainability more explicitly incorporates the triple bottom line. Advocates of circular-economy approaches argue that environmental, economic and social considerations should be addressed together.

== Aspects of environmentally sustainable design ==
=== Emotionally durable design ===
According to Jonathan Chapman of Carnegie Mellon University, emotionally durable design can reduce the consumption and waste of natural resources by increasing the resilience of relationships between consumers and products. In this view, product replacement may be delayed when users develop stronger emotional ties to objects. In his book, Emotionally Durable Design: Objects, Experiences & Empathy, Chapman describes how "the process of consumption is, and has always been, motivated by complex emotional drivers, and is about far more than just the mindless purchasing of newer and shinier things; it is a journey towards the ideal or desired self, that through cyclical loops of desire and disappointment, becomes a seemingly endless process of serial destruction". Therefore, a product requires an attribute, or number of attributes, which extend beyond utilitarianism.

According to Chapman, "emotional durability" can be achieved through consideration of the following five elements:

- Narrative: How users share a unique personal history with the product.
- Consciousness: How the product is perceived as autonomous and in possession of its own free will.
- Attachment: Can a user be made to feel a strong emotional connection to a product?
- Fiction: The product inspires interactions and connections beyond just the physical relationship.
- Surface: How the product ages and develops character through time and use.

As a strategic approach, "emotionally durable design provides a useful language to describe the contemporary relevance of designing responsible, well made, tactile products which the user can get to know and assign value to in the long-term". According to Hazel Clark and David Brody of Parsons The New School for Design in New York, "emotionally durable design is a call for professionals and students alike to prioritise the relationships between design and its users, as a way of developing more sustainable attitudes to, and in, design things".

Discussion by Júlíanna Ósk Hafberg of Likka Fashion Brand at the Reykjavík Art Museum

=== Beauty and sustainable design ===
Because standards of sustainable design appear to emphasise ethics over aesthetics, some designers and critics have complained that it lacks inspiration. Pritzker Architecture Prize winner Frank Gehry has called green building "bogus", and National Design Awards winner Peter Eisenman has dismissed it as "having nothing to do with architecture". In 2009, The American Prospect asked whether "well-designed green architecture" is an "oxymoron".

Some claim that such criticism of sustainable design is misguided. A leading advocate for this alternative view is architect Lance Hosey, whose book The Shape of Green: Aesthetics, Ecology, and Design (2012) was the first dedicated to the relationships between sustainability and beauty. Hosey argues not just that sustainable design needs to be aesthetically appealing in order to be successful, but also that following the principles of sustainability to their logical conclusion requires reimagining the shape of everything designed, creating things of even greater beauty. Reviewers have suggested that the ideas in The Shape of Green could "revolutionize what it means to be sustainable". Small and large buildings are beginning to successfully incorporate principles of sustainability into award-winning designs. Examples include One Central Park and the Science Faculty building, UTS.

The Living Building Challenge includes beauty as one of its design categories. This reflects the argument that products, buildings and places that are valued aesthetically are more likely to be maintained, adapted and preserved, which may reduce replacement and associated environmental impacts. Biophilic design makes a related claim: that contact with nature, daylight, air, vegetation and natural materials can support both aesthetic experience and environmental performance. Daylight design, for example, can reduce lighting loads while also improving occupants' connection to outdoor conditions.

=== Economic aspects ===
Economic considerations are central to many design decisions because capital cost, operating cost, maintenance risk and asset value influence what is built or manufactured. Sustainable design arguments therefore often include the economic case for reduced energy and water use, lower waste, longer product life, risk reduction and improved occupant productivity.

As the green design field has matured, integrated design has been presented as a way to achieve energy and environmental goals while managing cost. Architects, engineers and designers may therefore need to communicate both the technical and economic value of sustainable design measures.

=== Standards of evaluation ===
Several standards and rating systems have been developed as sustainability has become more widely adopted. Many focus on buildings, energy and water performance, while others address products, materials, landscapes or neighbourhoods. Certification may be based on design intent, construction documentation, measured performance or post-occupancy evidence.

- LEED – Leadership in energy and environmental design.
- Living building challenge
- HERS – Home energy rating
- WELS rating – water efficiency labelling standard
- BREEAM – Building Research Establishment's Environmental Assessment Method
- GBI – Green Building Initiative
- EPA WaterSense
- Energy Star
- FSC – Forest Stewardship Council
- CASBEE – Comprehensive Assessment System for Built Environment Efficiency
- Passive house.
- Net-Positive Design Net-Positive Design and Assessment computer app

When using sustainability standards, the choice of units, system boundaries and baselines can strongly affect the result. A weak baseline can make improvements appear large, while an already efficient baseline may show only modest percentage gains. Comparisons are therefore most useful when they use consistent boundaries, comparable assumptions and more than one performance metric.

=== Greenwashing ===
Greenwashing is commonly described as conveying a false impression or misleading information about the environmental qualities of a product, service or organisation. In design and construction, it may arise through vague environmental claims, selective disclosure, visually "green" branding, or the use of labels whose meaning is unclear to consumers. Third-party verified labels are generally more reliable than self-awarded claims, although eco-labelling systems vary in scope, transparency and rigour.

Greenwashing can influence consumer and client choices by creating a perception of environmental benefit that is not supported by evidence. One Swedish study found that the presence of an eco-label could affect purchase behaviour for ecological food. Greater transparency in labels, declarations and assessment methods can help users compare environmental claims more accurately. Some critiques argue that assessment tools themselves can contribute to greenwashing if they reward limited improvements while overlooking wider systemic impacts, as discussed in Net-Positive Design and Sustainable Urban Development.

=== LCA and product life ===
Life-cycle assessment evaluates the environmental impacts of materials, products or systems across stages such as extraction, transport, processing, refining, manufacturing, maintenance, use, disposal, reuse and recycling. It helps assess whether a design is environmentally preferable over the long term rather than only during one stage of use. For example, aluminium can be recycled many times, but primary aluminium production is energy intensive; LCA can help compare these trade-offs during design.

== Applications ==
Applications of sustainable design range from the microcosm, such as everyday objects, to the macrocosm, such as buildings, cities and landscapes. It can be applied in architecture, landscape architecture, urban design, urban planning, engineering, graphic design, industrial design, interior design, fashion design and human-computer interaction.

Sustainable design is mostly a general reaction to global environmental crises, the rapid growth of economic activity and human population, depletion of natural resources, damage to ecosystems, and loss of biodiversity. In 2013, eco architecture writer Bridgette Meinhold surveyed emergency and long-term sustainable housing projects that were developed in response to these crises in her book, "Urgent Architecture: 40 Sustainable Housing Solutions for a Changing World." Featured projects focus on green building, sustainable design, eco-friendly materials, affordability, material reuse, and humanitarian relief. Construction methods and materials include repurposed shipping containers, straw bale construction, sandbag homes, and floating homes.

The limits of sustainable design are shrinking. Because growth in goods and services consistently outpaces gains in efficiency. As a result, the net effect of sustainable design has simply been to improve the efficiency of rapidly increasing impacts. This problem is not solved by the current approach, which focuses on the efficiency of delivering individual goods and services. To address these limitations, scientific researchers propose methodologies. For example, the Design for Strong Sustainability (DfSoSy) methodology integrates ecological balance, social equity, and systemic changes into the design process, emphasising system robustness over mere efficiency improvements. The fundamental dilemmas are as follows: the increasing complexity of efficiency improvements; the difficulty of implementing new technologies in societies built around old ones; the fact that the physical impacts of delivering goods and services are not localised, but are distributed across economies; and the fact that the scale of resource use is growing and not stabilizing.

=== Sustainable architecture ===
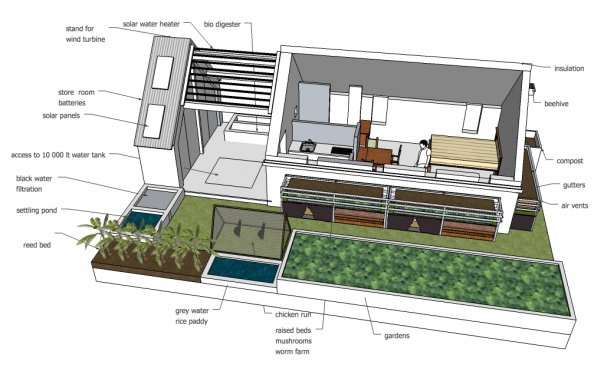
Sustainable building design

Sustainable architecture is the design of sustainable buildings. It seeks to reduce environmental impacts associated with building materials, construction, operation, maintenance and end-of-life processes. Relevant strategies include efficient heating and cooling systems, alternative energy sources such as solar hot water, appropriate siting, reused or recycled materials, on-site power generation such as solar technology, ground-source heat pumps and wind power, rainwater harvesting for irrigation, washing and aquifer recharge, and on-site waste management measures such as green roofs that filter and control stormwater runoff. These strategies require cooperation among clients, architects, engineers and other members of the design team from site selection and concept design through procurement and implementation.

Building location and footprint can be as important as building performance. A technically efficient building may still create high transport emissions if it is located where occupants depend on long-distance travel. Sustainable architecture also considers adaptability, durability, disassembly, demolition waste and the reuse or recycling of components at the end of a building's useful life.

In some cases, the most sustainable option may be to retrofit or upgrade an existing building rather than demolish and rebuild it. Studies of federal buildings in the United Arab Emirates, for example, have examined the potential of upgrades to reduce energy demand.

Sustainable architects design with sustainable living in mind. Sustainable vs green design is the challenge that designs not only reflect healthy processes and uses but are powered by renewable energies and site specific resources. A test for sustainable design is; can the design function for its intended use without fossil fuel; unplugged. This challenge suggests architects and planners design solutions that can function without pollution rather than just reducing pollution. As technology progresses in architecture and design theories and as examples are built and tested, architects will soon be able to create not only passive, null-emission buildings, but rather be able to integrate the entire power system into the building design. In 2004 the 59 home housing community, the Solar Settlement, and a 60,000 sq ft (5,600 m^{2}) integrated retail, commercial and residential building, the Sun Ship, were completed by architect Rolf Disch in Freiburg, Germany. The Solar Settlement is the first housing community worldwide in which every home, all 59, produce a positive energy balance.

An essential element of Sustainable Building Design is indoor environmental quality including air quality, illumination, thermal conditions, and acoustics. The integrated design of the indoor environment is essential and must be part of the integrated design of the entire structure. ASHRAE Guideline 10-2011 addresses the interactions among indoor environmental factors and goes beyond traditional standards.

Concurrently, the recent movements of New Urbanism and New Classical Architecture promote a sustainable approach towards construction, that appreciates and develops smart growth, architectural tradition and classical design. This in contrast to modernist and globally uniform architecture, as well as leaning against solitary housing estates and suburban sprawl. Both trends started in the 1980s. The Driehaus Architecture Prize is an award that recognizes efforts in New Urbanism and New Classical Architecture, and is endowed with a prize money twice as high as that of the modernist Pritzker Prize.

Several advances in sustainable architecture emerged in the late 20th Century that are now widely known by ordinary practitioners. These overlapping but distinct paradigms include Biophilic Urbanism, Permaculture, Biomimicry, Bioregional Planning, Regenerative Design, Circular Systems approaches ranging from Cradle to Cradle product design to the Circular Economy, Nature-Based Design, Net-zero Design, Nature Positive Design, and Net-Positive Design.

These paradigms go beyond traditional sustainable design, which simply integrates sustainable design techniques and technologies into conventional urban planning patterns and building design templates. Instead, they represent a broader societal shift (from aiming for resource and energy efficiency) to creating environments that contribute towards net outcomes, such as 'net-positive sustainability'. Net-positive architecture aims to reverse planetary overshoot as well as improving socio-ecological conditions by changing the nature of built environment decision making, design and assessment.

==== Green design ====
The term green design is sometimes used interchangeably with environmentally sustainable design. It generally refers to design practices that reduce environmental impacts through environmentally preferable processes, materials or technologies. Some commentators distinguish green design from sustainable design by treating green design as narrower, with a stronger focus on environmental performance and short-term impacts, while sustainable design also considers social and economic dimensions and wider systems. In this sense, green design can be understood as one component of sustainable design.

== Engineering design ==
Sustainable engineering involves designing or operating systems to use energy and resources at a rate that does not exceed the environment's capacity to regenerate them. The objective is to meet current needs without compromising the ability of future generations to meet their own. Applications include water supply, waste management, pollution control, and ecological restoration.

=== Sustainable interior design ===
Sustainable interior design applies environmental, health and social considerations to the design of interior spaces. It may address functionality, accessibility, aesthetics, indoor environmental quality and the selection of environmentally preferable materials, products and finishes. The integrated design of the indoor environment is therefore part of the wider design of the building.

==== Goals of sustainable interior design ====
A primary goal is to improve building performance while reducing negative environmental impacts. Indoor environmental quality is also important because people in many countries spend a large proportion of time indoors, where some pollutant concentrations can be higher than outdoors. Sustainable interior design therefore seeks to improve indoor air quality, daylight, comfort, material safety and durability while reducing waste and environmental impact.

Reducing consumption of non-renewable resources, minimising waste and creating healthy, productive environments are primary objectives of sustainability. Relevant interior-design strategies include the use of environmentally preferable products, water conservation, reduced energy demand, enhanced indoor environmental quality and operational and maintenance practices that support long-term performance. Indoor air quality, illumination, thermal conditions and acoustics are key elements of this work.

==== Incorporating sustainable interior design ====
Sustainable interior design can be incorporated through various techniques: water efficiency, energy efficiency, using non-toxic, sustainable or recycled materials, using manufactured processes and producing products with more energy efficiency, building longer lasting and better functioning products, designing reusable and recyclable products, following the sustainable design standards and guidelines, and more. For example, a room with large windows to allow for maximum sunlight should have neutral coloured interiors to help bounce the light around and increase comfort levels while reducing light energy requirement. The size should, however, be carefully considered to avoid window glare.

Interior Designers must take types of paints, adhesives, and more into consideration during their designing and manufacturing phase so they do not contribute to harmful environmental factors. Choosing whether to use a wood floor to marble tiled floor or carpeted floor can reduce energy consumption by the level of insulation that they provide. Utilizing materials that can withhold 24-hour health care facilities, such as linoleum, scrubbable cotton wall coverings, recycled carpeting, low toxic adhesive, and more.

Furthermore, incorporating sustainability can begin before the construction process begins. Purchasing items from sustainable local businesses, analysing the longevity of a product, taking part in recycling by purchasing recycled materials, and more should be taken into consideration. Supporting local, sustainable businesses is the first step, as this not only increases the demand for sustainable products, but also reduces unsustainable methods. Traveling all over to find specific products or purchasing products from overseas contributes to carbon emissions in the atmosphere, pulling further away from the sustainable aspect. Once the products are found, it is important to check if the selection follows the Cradle-to-cradle design (C2C) method and they are also able to be reclaimed, recycled, and reused. Also paying close attention to energy-efficient products during this entire process contributes to the sustainability factors. The aesthetic of a space does not have to be sacrificed in order to achieve sustainable interior design. Every environment and space can incorporate materials and choices to reducing environmental impact, while still providing durability and functionality.

==== Promotion of sustainable interior design ====
The mission to incorporate sustainable interior design into every aspect of life is slowly becoming a reality. The commercial Interior Design Association (IIDA) created the sustainability forum to encourage, support, and educate the design community and the public about sustainability. The Athena Sustainable Materials Institute ensures enabling smaller footprints by working with sustainability leaders in various ways in producing and consuming materials. Building Green considers themselves the most trusted voice for sustainable and healthy design, as they offer a variety of resources to dive deep into sustainability. Various acts, such as the Energy Policy Act (EPAct) of 2005 and the Energy Independence and Security Act (EISA) of 2007 have been revised and passed to achieve better efforts towards sustainable design. Federal efforts, such as the signing of a Memorandum of Understanding to the commitment of sustainable design and the Executive Order 13693 have also worked to achieve these concepts. Various guideline and standard documents have been published for the sake of sustainable interior design and companies like LEED (Leadership in Energy and Environmental Design) are guiding and certifying efforts put into motion to contribute to the mission. When the thought of incorporating sustainable design into an interior's design is kept as a top goal for a designer, creating an overall healthy and environmentally friendly space can be achieved.

==== Examples of sustainable interior design ====
- Proximity Hotel in North Carolina, United States of America: The Proximity Hotel was the first hotel to be granted the LEED Platinum certification from the US Green Building Council.
- Shanghai Natural History Museum in Shanghai, China: This new museum incorporates evaporative cooling and maintained temperatures through is design and structure.
- Vancouver Convention Centre West in Vancouver, Canada: This world-class facility achieved LEED v4.1 Platinum certification, recognizing its exceptional sustainability performance in areas like energy efficiency, water conservation, waste reduction, and indoor air quality.
- Bullitt Center in Seattle, Washington, United States of America: Considered "The Greenest Commercial Building in the World," it is the first to achieve the Living Building Challenge certification.
- Sydney, Australia became the first city in the country to contribute Green roof and Green wall to their architecture following their "Sustainable Sydney 2030" set of goals.

=== Sustainable urban planning ===
Sustainable urban planning applies sustainable design principles to the layout, infrastructure and governance of cities. It seeks to reduce carbon emissions, improve air quality, support sustainable energy systems, protect natural resources and create healthier urban environments. It draws on architecture, engineering, ecology, environmental science, materials science, law, transport planning, technology, economic development, finance and public administration.

Common strategies include green buildings, efficient housing, mixed-use development, walkability, greenways and open spaces, renewable energy systems and sustainable transport options. Sustainable land-use planning can improve community welfare by shaping neighbourhoods into healthier, more efficient and more accessible places. It also requires balancing social, architectural, economic, environmental and public-health considerations.

=== Sustainable landscape and garden design ===
Sustainable landscape architecture is a category of sustainable design and energy-efficient landscaping concerned with the planning and design of outdoor space. Plants and materials may be bought from local growers to reduce energy used in transportation. Design techniques include planting trees to shade buildings from the sun or protect them from wind, using local materials, and on-site composting and chipping not only to reduce green waste hauling but to increase organic matter and therefore carbon in the soil.

Some designers and gardeners such as Beth Chatto also use drought-resistant plants in arid areas (xeriscaping) and elsewhere so that water is not taken from local landscapes and habitats for irrigation. Water from building roofs may be collected in rain gardens so that the groundwater is recharged, instead of rainfall becoming surface runoff and increasing the risk of flooding.

Areas of the garden and landscape can also be allowed to grow wild to encourage bio-diversity. Native animals may also be encouraged in many other ways: by plants which provide food such as nectar and pollen for insects, or roosting or nesting habitats such as trees, or habitats such as ponds for amphibians and aquatic insects. Pesticides, especially persistent pesticides, must be avoided to avoid killing wildlife.

Soil fertility can be managed sustainably by the use of many layers of vegetation from trees to ground-cover plants and mulches to increase organic matter and therefore earthworms and mycorrhizae; nitrogen-fixing plants instead of synthetic nitrogen fertilizers; and sustainably harvested seaweed extract to replace micronutrients.

Sustainable landscapes and gardens can be productive (growing food, firewood and craft materials) as well as ornamental.

Sustainable landscape approaches and labels include organic farming and growing, permaculture, agroforestry, forest gardens, agroecology, vegan organic gardening, ecological gardening and climate-friendly gardening.

=== Sustainable agriculture ===
Sustainable agriculture adheres to three main goals:

- Environmental health,
- Economic profitability,
- Social and economic equity.

A variety of philosophies, policies and practices have contributed to these goals. People in many different capacities, from farmers to consumers, have shared this vision and contributed to it. Despite the diversity of people and perspectives, the following themes commonly weave through definitions of sustainable agriculture.

There are strenuous discussions; among others by the agricultural sector and authorities; if existing pesticide protocols and methods of soil conservation adequately protect topsoil and wildlife. Doubt has risen if these are sustainable, and if agrarian reforms would permit an efficient agriculture with fewer pesticides, therefore reducing the damage to the ecosystem.

=== Energy sector ===
Sustainable technology in the energy sector is based on utilising renewable sources of energy such as solar, wind, hydro, bioenergy, geothermal, and hydrogen. Wind energy is the world's fastest growing energy source; it has been in use for centuries in Europe and more recently in the United States and other nations. Wind energy is captured through the use of wind turbines that generate and transfer electricity for utilities, homeowners and remote villages. Solar power can be harnessed through photovoltaics, concentrating solar, or solar hot water and is also a rapidly growing energy source. Advancements in the technology and modifications to photovoltaics cells provide a more in depth untouched method for creating and producing solar power. Researchers have found a potential way to use the photogalvanic effect to transform sunlight into electric energy.

The availability, potential, and feasibility of primary renewable energy resources must be analysed early in the planning process as part of a comprehensive energy plan. The plan must justify energy demand and supply and assess the actual costs and benefits to the local, regional, and global environments. Responsible energy use is fundamental to sustainable development and a sustainable future. Energy management must balance justifiable energy demand with appropriate energy supply. The process couples energy awareness, energy conservation, and energy efficiency with the use of primary renewable energy resources.

=== Water sector ===
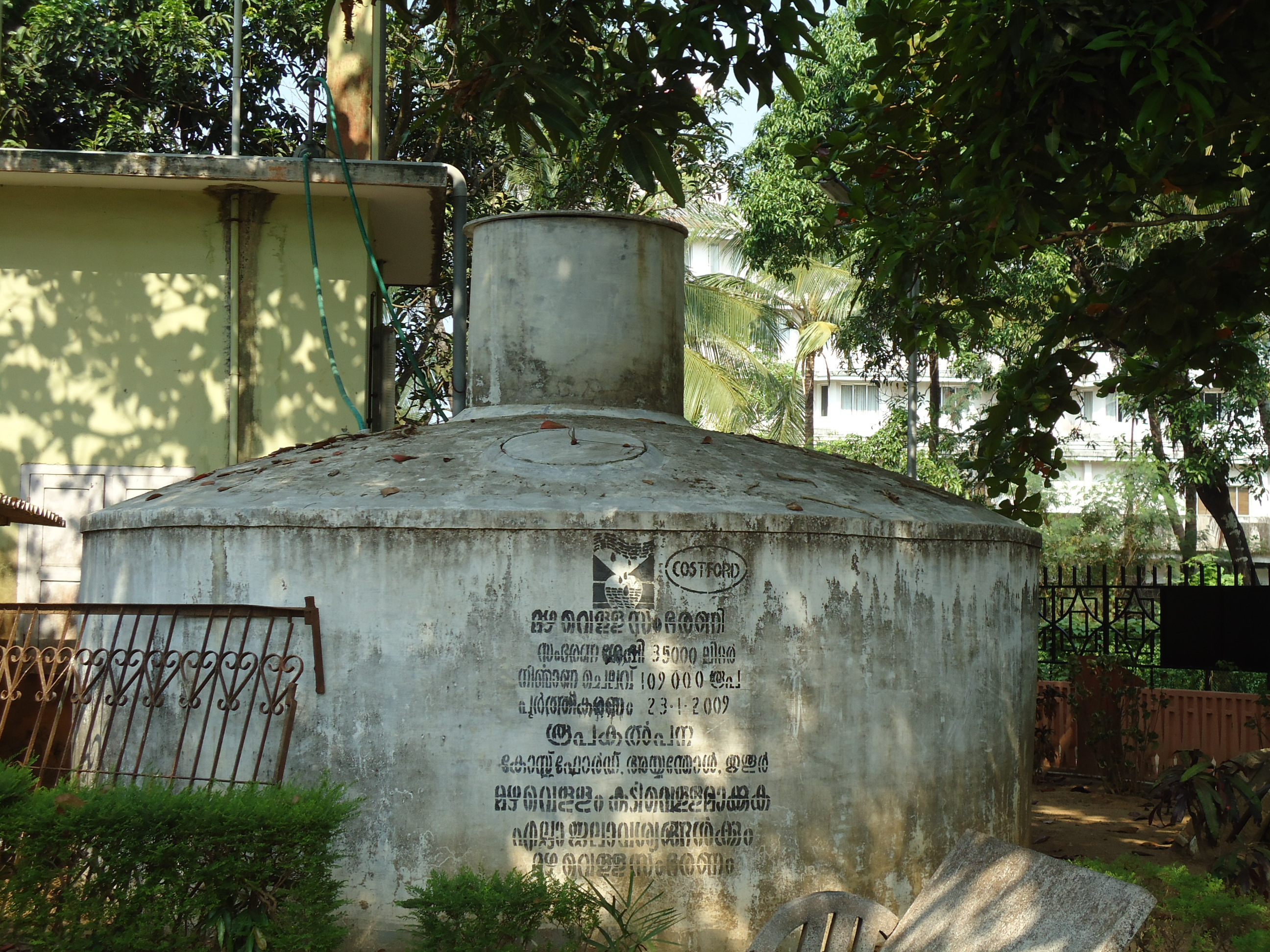
A 35,003 litre rainwater harvesting tank in Kerala

Sustainable water technologies have become an industry segment with several companies now providing multiple options for scalable solutions to supply water in a sustainable manner.

Beyond the use of certain technologies, Sustainable Design in Water Management also consists very importantly in correct implementation of concepts. Among these principal concepts is the fact normally in developed countries 100% of water destined for consumption, that is not necessarily for drinking purposes, is of potable water quality. This concept of differentiating qualities of water for different purposes has been called "fit-for-purpose". This more rational use of water achieves several economies, that are not only related to water itself, but also the consumption of energy, as to achieve water of drinking quality can be extremely energy intensive for several reasons.

=== Domestic machinery and furniture ===
Automobiles, home appliances and furnitures can be designed for repair and disassembly (for recycling), and constructed from recyclable materials such as steel, aluminium and glass, and renewable materials, such as wood and plastics from natural feedstocks. Careful selection of materials and manufacturing processes can often create products comparable in price and performance to non-sustainable products. Even mild design efforts can greatly increase the sustainable content of manufactured items.

Improvements to heating, cooling, ventilation and water heating

- Absorption refrigerator
- Annualized geothermal solar
- Earth cooling tubes
- Geothermal heat pump
- Heat recovery ventilation
- Hot water heat recycling
- Passive cooling
- Renewable heat
- Seasonal thermal energy storage (STES)
- Solar air conditioning
- Solar hot water
- Superinsulation

=== Design for sustainable manufacturing ===
Sustainable manufacturing can be defined as the creation of a manufactured product through a concurrent improvement in the resulting effect on factory and product sustainability. The concept of sustainable manufacturing demands a renewed design of production systems in order to condition the related sustainability on product life cycle and Factory operations.

- Designing sustainable production systems involves analysing and optimising intra-factory aspects of manufacturing plants. These aspects may include resource consumption, process efficiency, ergonomics for factory workers, elimination of hazardous substances, minimisation of factory emissions and waste, integrated information management and technological updates to machines and plants.
- Other inter-factories aspects concern the sustainable design of manufactured products, product chain dematerialisation, management of the background and foreground supply chains, support of circular economy paradigm, and the labelling for sustainability.

Advantageous reasons for why companies might choose to sustainably manufacture either their products or use a sustainable manufacturing process are:

- Increase operational efficiency by reducing costs and waste
- Respond to or reach new customers and increase competitive advantage
- Protect and strengthen brand and reputation and build public trust
- Build long-term business viability and success
- Respond to regulatory constraints and opportunities

== Sustainable technologies ==
Sustainable technologies are intended to use less energy and fewer limited resources, avoid depletion of natural resources, reduce direct and indirect pollution, and allow reuse or recycling at the end of useful life. They may also provide data, feedback or alerts that help identify opportunities for improving environmental performance. There is overlap with appropriate technology, which emphasises suitability to context, especially the needs of people in developing countries. However, the most appropriate technology is not always the most sustainable, and a sustainable technology may have costs or maintenance requirements that make it unsuitable in a particular context.

"Technology is deeply entrenched in our society; without it, society would immediately collapse. Moreover, technological changes can be perceived as easier to accomplish than lifestyle changes that might be required to solve the problems that we face."

The design of sustainable technology relies heavily on the flow of new information. Sustainable technology such as smart metering systems and intelligent sensors reduce energy consumption and help conserve water. These systems are ones that have more fundamental changes, rather than just switching to simple sustainable designs. Such designing requires constant updates and evolutions, to ensure true environmental sustainability, because the concept of sustainability is ever changing – with regards to our relationship with the environment. A large part of designing sustainable technology involves giving control to the users for their comfort and operation. For example, dimming controls help people adjust the light levels to their comfort. Sectioned lighting and lighting controls let people manipulate their lighting needs without worrying about affecting others – therefore reducing lighting loads.

== Innovation and development ==
Sustainable design can be understood as a precursor to environmentally sustainable development, because design decisions shape how development is planned, built, used and maintained. Sustainable development aims to meet social needs without undermining ecosystems and the services they provide. Florian Popescu summarised the relationship between design and development by writing: "Without development, design is useless. Without design, development is unusable."

Eco-innovation is the design and development of products and processes that contribute to sustainable development, applying the commercial application of knowledge to elicit direct or indirect ecological improvements. This includes a range of related ideas, from environmentally friendly technological advances to socially acceptable innovative paths towards sustainability. WIPO GREEN is an online global marketplace for technology exchange connecting providers and seekers of inventions and innovations in sustainable technology innovations.

Several factors drive design innovation in the environmental sphere. These include growing consumer awareness and demand for green products and services, development and (re)discovery of renewable materials, sustainable refurbishment, new technologies for manufacturing and growing use of artificial intelligence-based tools based to map needs and identify areas for improved efficiency.

Whatever the industry or product, design rights (whether registered or unregistered) can harness innovative design. Design rights (known as design patents in some jurisdictions) are widely used to protect everything from marketing logos and packaging to the shape of furniture and vehicles and the user interfaces of computers and smartphones. Design rights are available in many jurisdictions and through regional systems. Protection can also be obtained internationally using the WIPO-administered Hague System for the International Registration of Designs.

== See also ==
- Bright green environmentalism
- Building Information Modeling
- Building services engineering
- Circles of Sustainability
- Cool roof
- Cradle to Cradle
- Daylighting (architecture)
- Earth embassy
- Ecodistrict
- Ecological Restoration
- Ecosa Institute
- Ecosystem services
- Energy plus house
- Green chemistry
- Green transport
- Housing crisis
- Landscape ecology
- List of energy storage projects
- List of low-energy building techniques
- Metadesign
- Principles of Intelligent Urbanism
- Source reduction
- Sustainable art
- Tasmanian House
- Terreform ONE
- Urban vitality
- Vertical garden
- Zero energy building
