= Hornblower Hybrid =

Family of ferryboats

The Hornblower Hybrid is a family of ferry boats belonging to US operator Hornblower Cruises, which are powered with hybrid power trains.

== San Francisco Hornblower Hybrid ==
San Francisco Hornblower Hybrid
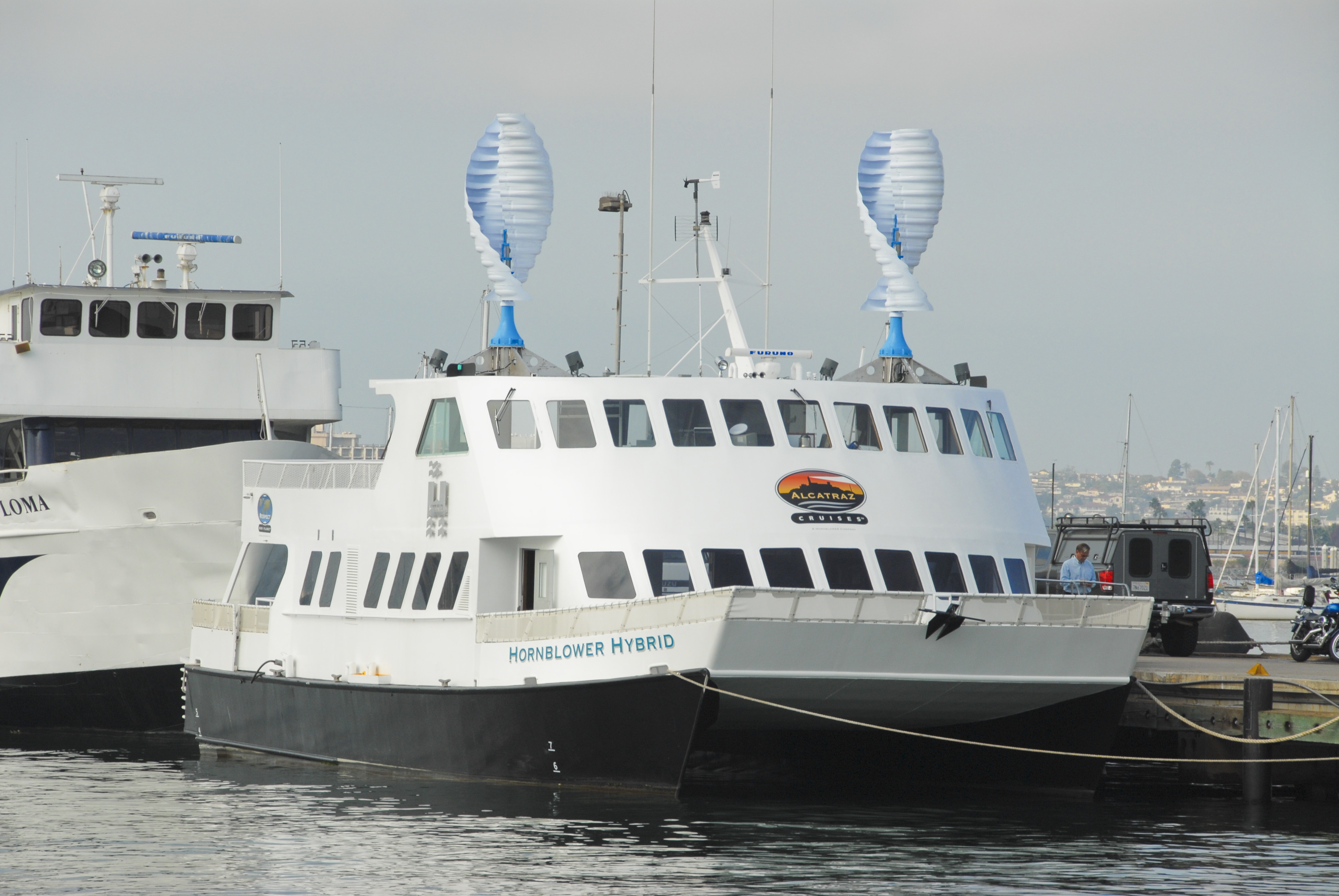
- Length: 64 feet
- Beam: 30 Feet
- Draft: 5 feet 8 Inches
- Main Propulsion: (2) 400 HP AC Induction Motors
- Ships Service Power: Tier II Diesel Engines, Solar & Wind
- Batteries: (2) 380 VDC AGM Battery Banks

The San Francisco Hornblower Hybrid is a 64-foot-long (20 m) catamaran, with a fully enclosed main deck, and covered roof deck. In 2008 the vessel was acquired by Alcatraz Cruises, a subsidiary of Hornblower Cruises. The vessel, which was previously a commercial diving boat, underwent a retrofit, repower and refurbishment operation, at a cost of USD 4 million.

In addition to its main power train, which consists of Tier 2 marine diesel engines, the Hornblower Hybrid uses power generated by two ten-foot-tall twisted Savonius wind turbines and a photovoltaic solar array covering the awning on the top deck. That supplementary power is converted and stored in batteries which power the navigation equipment, lighting, and electronics on board. Excess power can be stored in the main propulsion battery banks. The ship was presented as the first passenger boat in the US to use both wind and sun power.

The drive system allows the captain to monitor the energy needs of the vessel and select the most appropriate power sources. For example, when the boat is idle at the dock, the engines may shut off so that the motors may run on energy stored in the battery banks.

The vessel also contains a number of other environmentally friendly materials. The carpeting contains post consumer recycled materials, is recyclable and meets the US Green Building Council LEED criteria for recycled content. A significant portion of the interior signage is printed on Plyboo, a composite material made from sustainable sources and containing no harmful chemicals. The lighting throughout the vessel is LED.

The ship was mentioned among the Workboat Significant Boats of 2009 list. It was a finalist in the Sustainable Shipping awards.

== New York Hornblower Hybrid ==
New York Hornblower Hybrid
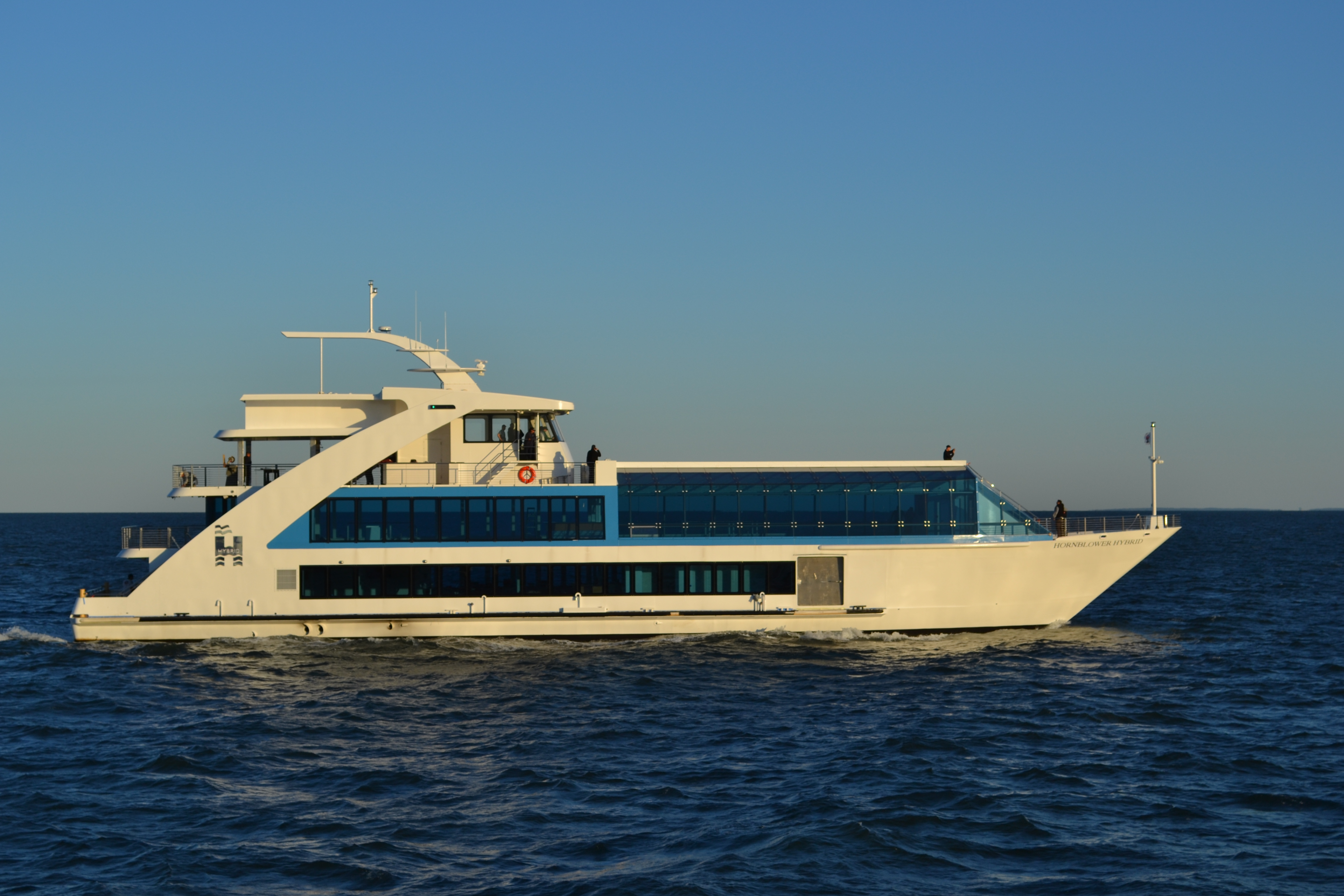
- Length: 168 feet
- Beam: 40 Feet
- Draft: 6 feet
- Main Propulsion: (2) 700 HP AC Induction Motors
- Ships Service Power: Scania Tier II Diesel Engines, Hydrogen PEM Fuel Cell, Solar & Wind
- Batteries: (2) 700 VDC AGM Battery Banks

Two years after the introduction of the San Francisco vessel, Hornblower Cruises subsidiary Statue Cruises announced works on a second ship. The New York Hornblower Hybrid was completed on October 26, 2011.

In addition to using solar power, wind power, and low-emission diesel, the New York Hornblower Hybrid also runs on hydrogen fuel cells, making it the first hydrogen hybrid ferry in the world. The Hybrid is 168 feet long by 40 feet wide and designed to carry 600 passengers. It features two Helix wind 5-kilowatt wind turbines, a 20 kilowatt solar array, LEED certified carpets, LED lighting, and an interior made partly of recycled and sustainable materials.

== Alcatraz Clipper Hybrid ==
Alcatraz Clipper Hybrid
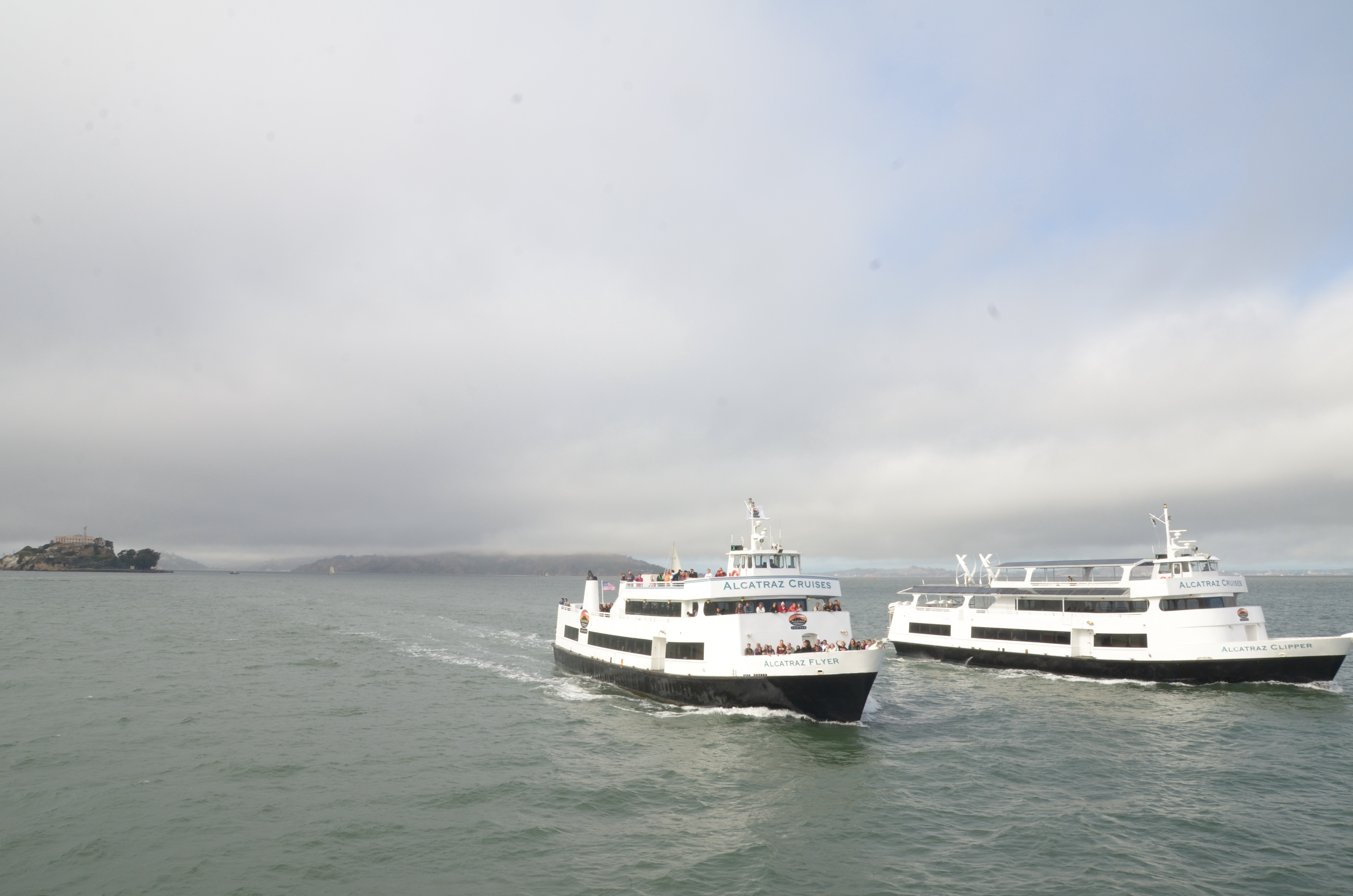
- Length: 120 feet
- Beam: 30 Feet
- Draft: 6 feet
- Main Propulsion: (2) 700 HP AC Induction Motors
- Ships Service Power: MTU Series 60 Tier II Diesel Engines, Sunpower E318 Solar & Wind
- Batteries: (2) 700 VDC AGM Battery Banks

The Alcatraz Clipper Hybrid was originally constructed in the early 1970s as a vessel to serve Catalina Island. Hornblower Cruises subsidiary Alcatraz Cruises acquired the vessel in 2008 and retrofitted it to have Tier II engines with a Selective Catalytic Reduction (SCR) units. In 2011 Alcatraz Cruises implemented Hornblower's Hybrid technology.

== Environmental impact ==
In 2008, the operator announced that it hoped to achieve 75% fuel consumption reduction using the San Francisco Hornblower Hybrid's technology, However, no independent evaluation of the vessel's ecological impact has been published. The San Francisco Hornblower Hybrid underwent a refit in 2024 that eliminated its hybrid propulsion system, reverting to a diesel powered boat.
