= City Cruises =

American ferry company

- Locale: Most Major US Waterways, Niagara Falls, London
- Waterway: Near Coastal and Lakes, Bays & Sounds
- Transit type: Charter Yachts, Dining Cruises, Ferry Service, Tourist Attractions, Commuter Ferry, Overnight Cruises
- Owner: Terry MacRae (Founder & Chairman); Mike Flaskey (CEO)
- Operator: Hornblower Group
- Began operation: 1980
- Website: cityexperiences.com

City Cruises (formerly Hornblower Cruises) is a charter yacht, dining cruise and ferry services company operating in the United States, Canada, and the United Kingdom. It is part of the City Experiences brand under Hornblower Group. In April 2021, Hornblower Group rebranded most tour and cruise operations under the City Experiences umbrella, with City Cruises as the signature sub-brand; in February 2024 its parent, Hornblower Group, filed for bankruptcy protection and the company emerged in July 2024 following a court-approved restructuring.

== History ==
The company began in 1974 in Berkeley, California with two ships. In 1980 the original owner, Ward Proescher, sold the business to Terry MacRae and P. Michael Watson. Proescher later went on to start a competing charter yacht company in the Bay Area, Commodore Cruises. By acquiring existing charter yacht companies, Hornblower was able to expand into San Diego in 1984, followed by Newport Beach in 1987. Shortly thereafter the company acquired the Marina del Rey–based Marina Cruise Lines. By 1989, the company operated in Berkeley, San Francisco, San Diego, Newport Beach and Marina del Rey. The corporate headquarters were long located on the historic ferry Santa Rosa, moored at Pier 3 in San Francisco.

In 1992, Terry MacRae became the sole owner of Hornblower Yachts, Inc, which was rebranded as Hornblower Cruises & Events to more accurately reflect the products and services offered. In 1996 Hornblower Marine Services (HMS) was created to fill a need as a consultant to the booming riverboat casino and ferry service operations industry. By 2003, HMS grew to 80 employees, with offices in San Francisco, New London, Boston and Jacksonville. Three years later, HMS had become the leading worldwide provider of high-speed ferry services.

In 2019, Hornblower Cruises & Events acquired Entertainment Cruises and all the operations encompassing it. The purchase of Entertainment Cruises doubled the number of ships and locations that Hornblower operates. In October of the same year, Hornblower acquired English tour boat operator City Cruises which has operations in London, and York. In 2020, Hornblower expanded in Boston by acquiring Boston Harbor Cruises.

In April 2021, Hornblower Group brought its U.S. and international tours and on-the-water experiences under the City Experiences umbrella, retaining City Cruises as the cruise sub-brand. In 2022, Hornblower acquired Experience Australia Group Pty Ltd, a diversified tourism business based in Adelaide, South Australia, known mainly for operating Australian interstate experiential tourism trains (The Ghan, the Indian Pacific, The Overland, and the Great Southern) but also with interests in cruise and air tourism. In turn, the company had been owned by Quadrant Private Equity since 2016. In January 2022, Quadrant Private Equity sold the business to Hornblower.

On February 21, 2024, Hornblower Group filed for Chapter 11 bankruptcy, also filing proceedings under the Companies' Creditors Arrangement Act of Canada shortly after. Hornblower announced that it would be suspending all future operations for its American Queen Voyages brand and placed it up for sale as the company planned to focus on its other subsidiaries. Hornblower was subsequently sold to Strategic Value Partners that same day. Hornblower Group completed its financial restructuring and emerged in July 2024.

City Cruises operates out of 19 different ports: San Francisco, Berkeley, Sacramento, Marina Del Rey, Long Beach, Newport Beach, San Diego, Washington D.C., Alexandria, Boston, Chicago, Norfolk, Philadelphia, Toronto, Port of New York and New Jersey, London and York. The company's entire fleet now includes more than 80 boats.

== Cruises and ferry services ==
=== Niagara City Cruises ===
Hornblower Canada Company, a Canadian subsidiary of Hornblower Group, operates Niagara City Cruises (formerly Hornblower Niagara Cruises), which provides the Niagara Falls Gorge Boat Tour from the Canadian side of the Niagara River near Niagara Falls, similar to the Maid of the Mist cruises out of Niagara Falls, New York on the American side. The fleet includes Niagara Wonder and Niagara Thunder, each carrying 700 passengers. The boats are based on an Elliot Bay Design Group design and built by Hike Metal Products of Wheatley, Ontario. Access to the ships is enabled by the Hornblower Niagara Funicular.

- Niagara Wonder
  - Years of service: since 2013
  - Type: double-stack catamaran tour boat
  - Engine: 2 x 450 BHP at 1800 RPM Scania DI13
- Niagara Thunder
  - Years of service: since 2013
  - Type: double-stack catamaran tour boat
  - Engine: 2 x 450 BHP at 1800 RPM Scania DI13

=== Lake Tahoe Cruises ===
Between 1997 and 2002 Hornblower operated in Lake Tahoe, beginning with the acquisition of Lake Tahoe Cruises Inc. and the vessels Tahoe Queen and Tahoe Princess. Business expanded to include ferry service across Lake Tahoe and land shuttle services between South Lake Tahoe and Palisades Tahoe Ski Resort. Lake Link ferry service was launched across Lake Tahoe, and was the fastest passenger boat on the lake. In 2002 the Lake Tahoe port was sold to Aramark—the owner and operator of the MS Dixie—the primary long-standing competition for the Tahoe Queen.

=== Alcatraz City Cruises ===
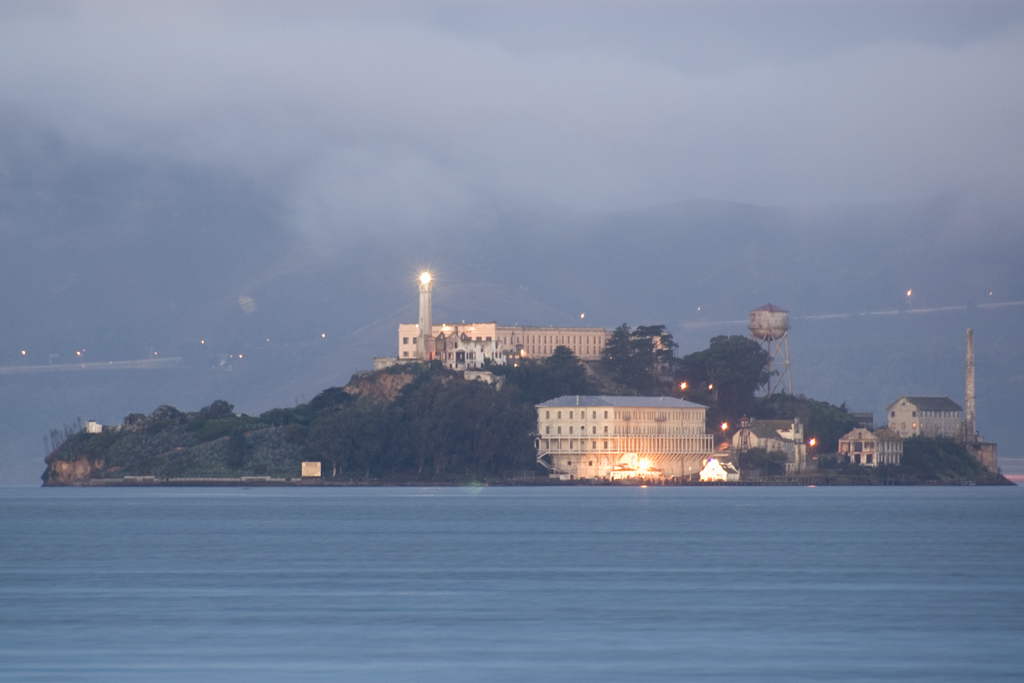
Alcatraz Island

In 2006 Hornblower won the National Park Service concession for ferry service to Alcatraz Island when the contract with Blue & Gold Fleet expired. Under the name Alcatraz City Cruises, the company provides ticketing and transportation for the roughly one and a half million visitors to the island every year.

In 2008, Alcatraz Cruises introduced the Hornblower Hybrid to the fleet—the first hybrid ferry in the United States. The Hybrid runs off of solar power, wind power, and low-emission diesel fuel.

=== Statue City Cruises ===
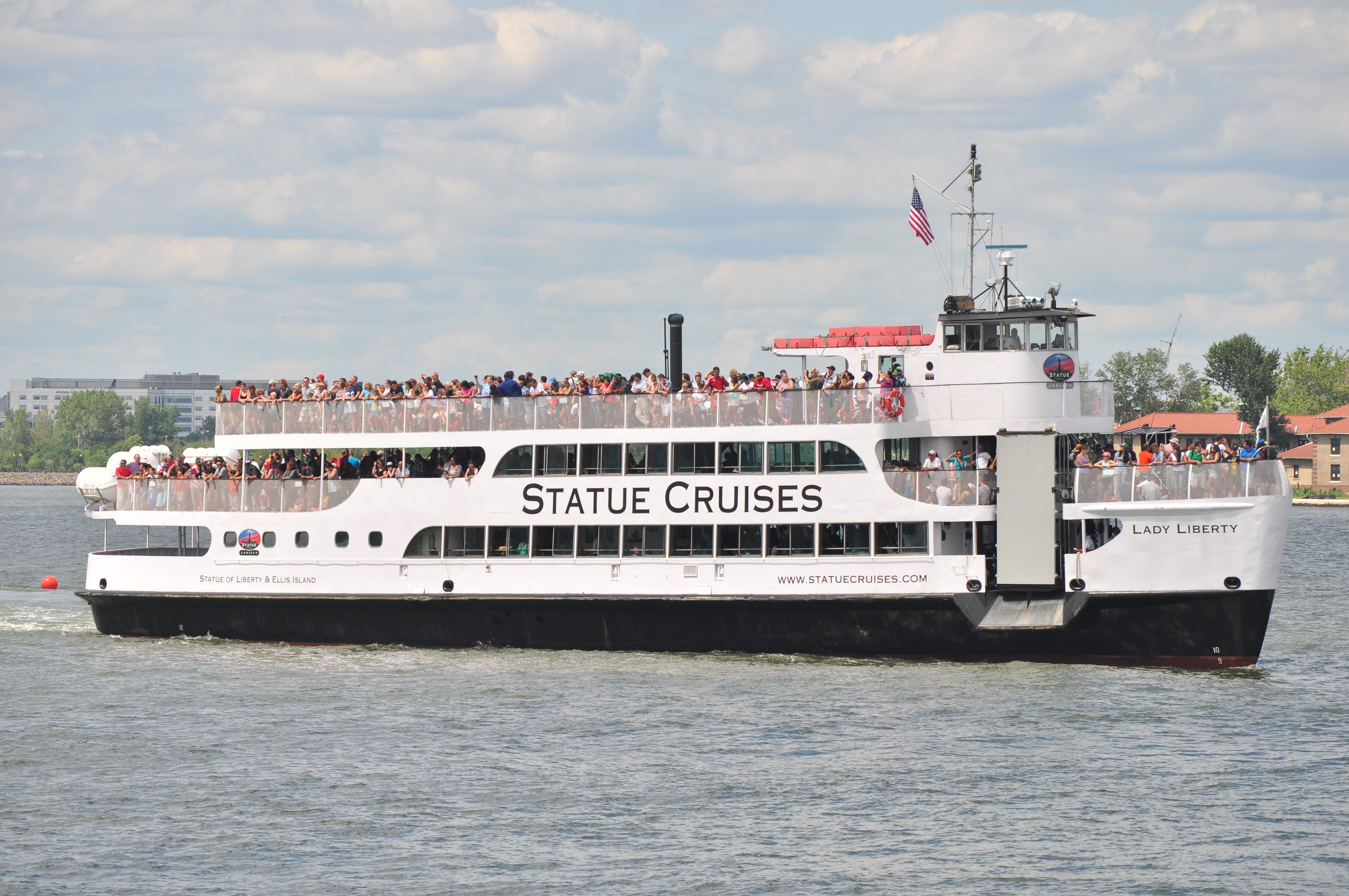
Statue City Cruises - Lady Liberty

In 2007 the company was awarded a concession from the National Park Service to operate ferries to Liberty Island and Ellis Island, the only public access to the national historic sites in the Port of New York and New Jersey. This replaced Circle Line, which had operated the service since 1953. Under the name Statue City Cruises, the company provides ticketing service and transportation for visitors to the Statue of Liberty National Monument and Ellis Island Immigration Museum. Boats depart from either Communipaw Terminal, Liberty State Park in Jersey City or Castle Clinton, Battery Park in Lower Manhattan. The National Park Service selected Statue City Cruises to continue as the authorized concessioner under a 10-year contract beginning March 1, 2024.

The affiliated Liberty Water Taxi operates between Liberty State Park and the Battery Park City Ferry Terminal.

=== Hornblower New York (now City Cruises) ===
Separately from its Liberty and Ellis Island service, City Cruises operates a fleet of New York–based yachts from Pier 15 on the East River and Pier 40 on the Hudson River, offering scheduled sightseeing and dining cruises and special-event charter excursions.

=== NYC Ferry ===
In 2015, Hornblower Cruises was selected to operate New York City's NYC Ferry service, which started operations on May 1, 2017. It is the company's first commuter ferry operation. One route connects Lower Manhattan and Midtown Manhattan with nearby points across the East River in northern Brooklyn and in Queens, while a second route connects Lower Manhattan with Rockaway Park in Queens. A third route, which began on June 1, 2017, connects Lower Manhattan with riverfront communities in southern Brooklyn. A fourth route, connecting Manhattan with Astoria, Queens, began operating on August 19, 2017. Two additional routes to Soundview, Bronx, and to the Lower East Side of Manhattan started operating in August 2018.

== Notable yachts ==
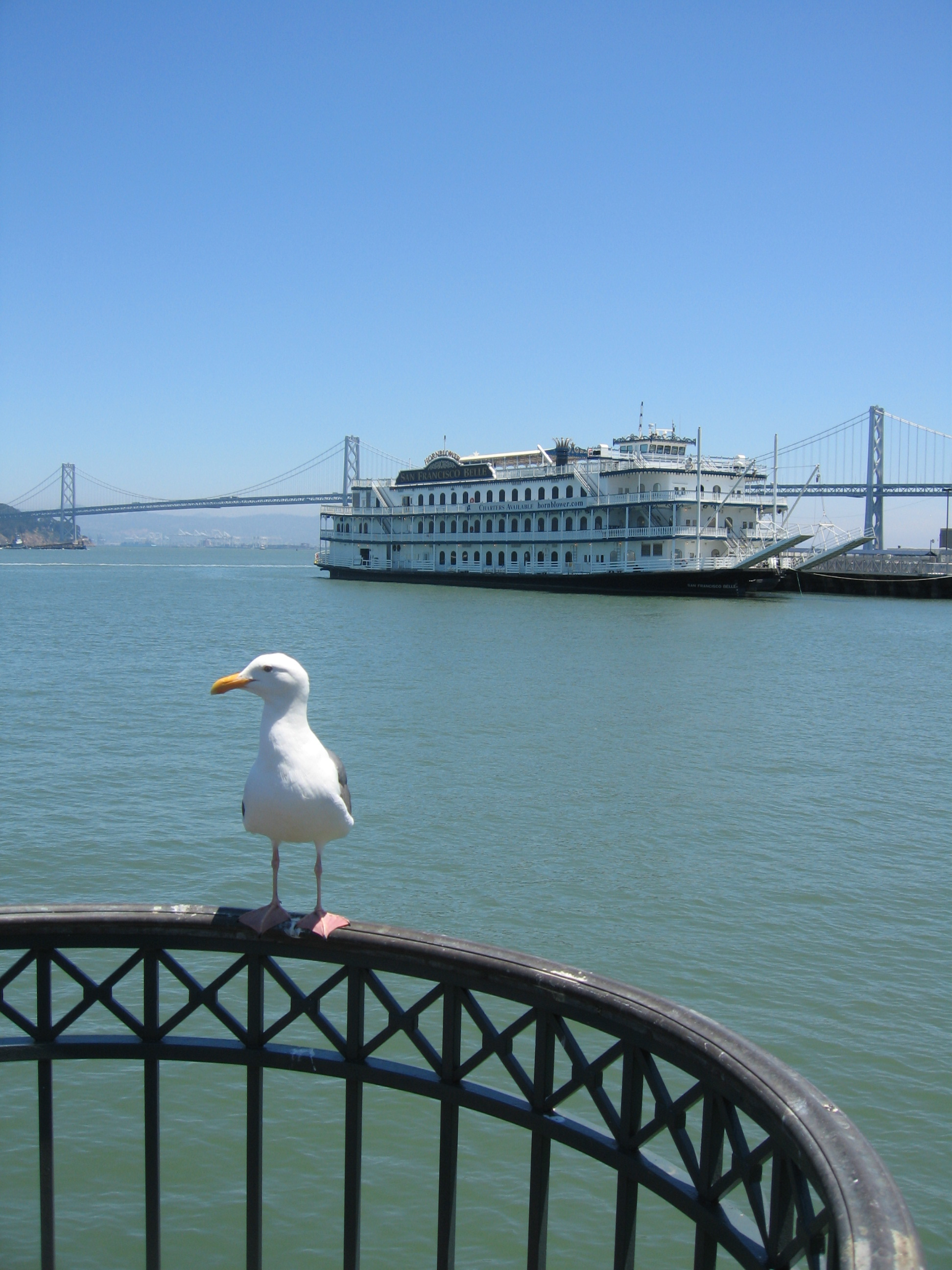
San Francisco Belle

- MV Zumbrota, built for circus magnate Charles Ringling and named for the then-largest elephant in captivity, was acquired to serve guests in San Diego. It is based at Marina del Rey.
- MV Wild Goose (ex USS YMS-328) formerly John Wayne's private yacht, joined the fleet in 1995. The vintage 1942 restored minesweeper continues to operate at Newport Beach.
- The ferryboat Santa Rosa, which ferried passengers between San Francisco and the East Bay, serves at the company's corporate office.
- MV San Francisco Belle, a paddlewheel style vessel, joined the fleet in 2001. San Francisco Belle, with a capacity of 2,200, is the largest dining yacht on the West Coast.
- San Francisco Hornblower Hybrid, the first hybrid ferry in the United States, was completed in 2008 and serves visitors to Alcatraz Island and Angel Island in San Francisco Bay.
