= Earth Embassy =

Japanese eco-business group

The Earth Embassy (地球大使館, Chikyū Taishikan) is a sustainable design, architecture and eco-business group dedicated to developing, building and promoting environmentally sound homes and community centered on organic farms, renewable energy and small business incubation hubs.

Founded on Mt Fuji, Japan, circa 2000, the group operates several projects in Japan and abroad with offices in Tokyo, Yamanashi, New York City and Uganda.

== Projects ==
"The Earth Embassy supports and operates a number of projects and businesses with the goal for participants and staff to become self-sufficient and capable of growing independently".

- The Solar Cafe & Farm - promotes sustainable agriculture through the restaurant, farm education programs for kids, events, "Natural" weddings and intern programs. The farm school provides land, resources and training for start-up organic farmers.
- Eden Homes Y.K. - registered in 2006 as an architectural design & build company for real estate re-development. Projects include: Shojiko Kominka antique home restorations, Saiko Solar Lodges, Aquaponics Greenhouse, etc.
- Jajja's Kids - supporting Ugandan street children by fundraising and providing food, shelter, vocational training, mentorship and love.
- Mt Fuji Natural Farms - all natural foods, water and organic products.

== Awards ==
- 2011 Cabinet Office of the Prime Minister - Business Development Grant:"Sustainable Development Education Program for Rural Japan"
- 2010 Eco Cup Japan - Outstanding Design Award: "The Aquaponic Home: Domestic Food Production System"
- 2010 Founder, Jacob Reiner "The Entrepreneur Award Japan" (TEAJ) presented by US Ambassador John V. Roos: EMI Award; Entrepreneur Mentorship Initiative. Co-sponsored by US State Dept. and Japan Gaimushou
