= Proximity Hotel =

Coordinates: 36.0891°N 79.8208°W

- Interactive map of the Proximity Hotel area

General information
- Location: 704 Green Valley Road; Greensboro, North Carolina
- Opening: 2007
- Owner: Quaintance Weaver Restaurants and Hotels

Other information
- Number of rooms: 147
- Number of restaurants: 1

Website
- www.proximityhotel.com

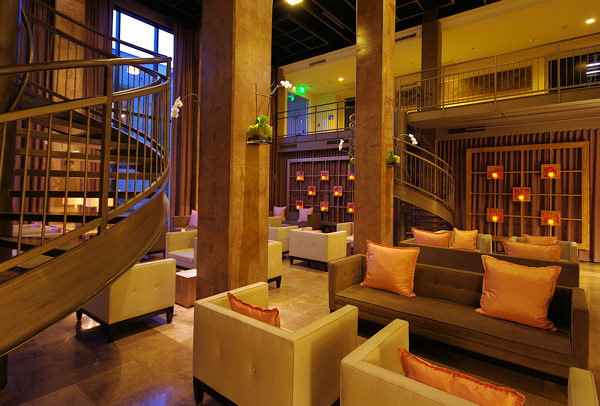
Social Lobby

The Proximity Hotel, located in Greensboro, North Carolina, is the first Platinum LEED certified green hotel in the United States. Opened in 2007, this 147-room luxury boutique hotel has over 5,000 square feet (460 m^{2}) of meeting and event space as well as a full-service restaurant. The hotel utilized more than 70 sustainable practices during construction and is a model for green hotel construction.

== History ==
Built and operated by Quaintance-Weaver Restaurants and Hotels, the Proximity Hotel opened in November 2007. In October 2008, the hotel and the adjacent Print Works Bistro restaurant became the first in the hospitality industry to be awarded LEED Platinum by the U.S. Green Building Council. The design and construction of the hotel were led by Dennis Quaintance, CEO of Quaintance-Weaver. Proximity Hotel is located near the University of North Carolina at Greensboro. Quaintance-Weaver opened their first hotel, O.Henry Hotel, four blocks west in 1998.

Proximity Hotel and Print Works Bistro, are named for two cotton mills in Greensboro. These mills were part of Cone Mills, with more than a century of history in the textile industry. Cone Mills was known as the world's largest manufacturer of denim fabric and the United States' largest printer of home-furnishings fabrics.

== Sustainable Practices ==
This hotel uses 41% less energy than a conventional hotel/restaurant by using ultra efficient materials and the latest construction technology.

- 100 solar panels covering the 4,000 square feet (370 m^{2}) of rooftop heats 60% of the water for both the hotel and restaurant.
- 700 linear feet of stream was restored.
- The bistro bar is made of salvaged, solid walnut trees that came down through sickness or storm and room service trays made of Plyboo (bamboo plywood).
- Newly engineered variable-speed hoods in the restaurant uses a series of sensors to set the power according to the kitchen's needs and adjusts to a lower level of operation (typically 25% of their full capacity).
- Geothermal energy is used for the restaurant’s refrigeration equipment, instead of a standard water-cooled system.
- North America's first Regenerative Drive model of the Otis' Gen2 elevator reduces net energy usage by capturing the system’s energy and feeds it back into the building’s internal electrical grid.
- A direct line of sight to the outdoor environment for more than 97% of all regularly occupied spaces.
- Building materials with recycled content include reinforced steel with 90% post consumer recycled content, sheetrock 100%, asphalt 25% and staircase steel 50%. Concrete contains 4% fly ash (224,000 pounds), the mineral residue left after the combustion of coal that is diverted from landfills.
- 87% of construction waste was recycled, diverting 1,535 tons of debris from landfills.
- Water usage has been reduced by 33% by installing high-efficiency Kohler plumbing fixtures.
- Air quality improved by circulating large amounts of outside air into guestrooms in an energy efficient way by employing “energy recovery” technology.
- Regional vendors and artists were used for materials to reduce transportation and packaging.
- Low-emitting volatile organic compound (VOC) paints, adhesives, carpets, etc. reduces indoor air contamination.
- Guestroom shelving and the bistro’s tabletops are made of walnut veneer, over a substrate of SkyBlend, a particleboard made from 100% post-industrial recycled wood pulp with no added formaldehyde.
- A green, vegetated rooftop will be planted on the restaurant to reduce the “urban heat island effect.”
