= Sustainable design standards =

Sustainable design standards are technical standards which codify and define sustainable design. They are intended to measure objects' and structures' impact on the environment and efficiency.

== Design Standards ==
One of the better-known sustainable design standards is the Leadership in Energy and Environmental Design (LEED) green building rating system. It uses a range of measures of environmental quality and impacts to define a holistic approach to sustainable building and assign ratings to individual projects.

Sustainable design can be considered a more determined effort to consider the whole range of environmental impacts when making a decision. The "Whole Building Design Guide", developed by the National Institute of Building Sciences, was originally guidance designed to serve U.S. federal agencies but has become a resource that is used by both the private sector and government agencies alike.

Green construction codes and standards are beginning to emerge on the national code stage. The standards go beyond energy standards such as ASHRAE 90.1 and the International Energy Conservation Code (IECC) to cover additional areas such as site sustainability, water efficiency, indoor environmental quality and materials and resources. The first is ASHRAE 189.1, Standard for the Design of High-Performance, Green Buildings Except Low-Rise Residential Buildings, published by ASHRAE in January 2010 in conjunction with the U.S. Green Building Council and the Illuminating Engineering Society. Standard 189.1 provides criteria by which a building can be judged as “green,” written in model code language that jurisdictions can use to develop a green building construction code.

Several organizations have developed their own ways of setting goals for energy reductions, such as Architecture 2030 and for qualifying performance toward them such as Cradle to Cradle.

== Design Methods ==
Sustainable design utilizes sustainable evolution and design progression for the methodology process. The developed products have an impact on all three areas of sustainability; environment, economic, and social.

Environmental Sustainability

Sustainable design centers on reducing environmental impact throughout a product’s entire life cycle. Design for Environment (DFE), or eco-design, systematically evaluates the ecological, health, and safety implications of a product from raw material extraction to final disposal. This approach moves beyond simple end-of-pipe solutions, focusing instead on prevention and minimization at the source. Key strategies include selecting sustainable and non-toxic materials, enhancing energy efficiency during use, and designing for disassembly and recycling.

Economic Sustainability

Economic sustainability demonstrates that environmental responsibility can drive financial efficiency. Tools like Design for Cost (DFC), Design for Assembly (DFA), and Design for Manufacturing (DFM) are often utilized. DFC minimizes total life-cycle costs by optimizing resource use and reducing waste, while DFA and DFM streamline production processes by simplifying part counts and assembly procedures.

Social Sustainability

The social dimension of sustainable design focuses on maximizing human well-being, equity, and social cohesion. Design for Sustainable Behavior (DFSB) influences user habits through user-centered design that aligns consumption with sustainable values. Design for Social Responsibility (DFSR) expands the designer’s role beyond profit to include ethical considerations such as accessibility, inclusivity, and fair labor practices.

Additional Methodology

BIM (building information modeling) allows designers to work with many remote consultants on the same data file that represents all the decisions being made by the team. The same file is available to the climate and energy and environmental impact analysis and cost analysis tools and consultants, as well as to the prospective contractors and the regulators. Along with this new integrated access to the model a new way to integrate the conversation of so many people is needed, each with some interest in reviewing each other's comments on the progress with the central design model. That may involve development of wiki tools for the process. One such early implementation of a Wiki SD tool called "4Dsustainability" organizes the project design evolution around the general learning process of how the problem is defined by exploring its environment and following that through the project.

The main difference between sustainable design methods and conventional design is incorporating the entire environment of the project's stakeholders on the design team, essentially, requiring new ways to explore connections and for more people and perspectives to be taken into account. Other methods that recognize this requirement are the "AIA SDAT" (sustainable design assessment team) program and the "Scenarios for sustainability" process design tools.
