= Plyboo =

Bamboo flooring company

Plyboo is one of the brands owned by Smith & Fong Co., a privately held building materials company based in San Francisco. Plyboo was launched as a brand in 1993 by Smith & Fong, the first U.S. company to sell imported bamboo flooring in North America. Although Smith & Fong Co. is the parent company, Plyboo has come to be how the company is primarily identified.

== History ==
Dan Smith and James Fong founded Smith & Fong in 1989 as a design/manufacturer of art-craft quality bamboo pieces. The company's puzzle boxes, trays and tea canisters were sold at Gump's in San Francisco, the New York Museum of Modern Art, the Chicago Art Institute and other boutiques and retailers nationwide. Four years later Smith & Fong converted a Chinese tea-processing plant to produce bamboo flooring and worked out a distribution agreement with a Bay Area-based flooring distributor. Under the name Plyboo, Smith & Fong was the first company to bring bamboo flooring to the US market. The first product was an amber flat-grain flooring that is still in stock today. In 1996, Angus Stocks joined Smith & Fong as an equity partner. The company leased its own space and took possession of its inventory. A second color of bamboo flooring (natural) was added, and the company introduced architectural-grade bamboo plywood to the marketplace. Smith & Fong incorporated in 1997, and spent the remainder of the 1990s adding more bamboo flooring and plywood options to its Plyboo offerings. In 2000, the company launched bamboo strand flooring; in 2001, Smith & Fong introduced coconut palm plywood and flooring under the Durapalm brand, and bamboo plywood production moved to a 4’x8’ dimension.

The company ventured into the sports floor market with PlybooSport in 2006 with its first installation in Dallas, Texas, where Smith & Fong first launched its flooring business 13 years prior. In 2007, Smith & Fong announced it would be converting its manufacturing operations to run urea formaldehyde-free adhesives (PlybooPure™) on its plywood, flooring and veneer lines. Plyboo's product lines are now available urea formaldehyde-free throughout North America. All Smith & Fong products undergo third-party lab-testing for emissions compliance. The products pass the California Air Resources Board (CARB)'s formaldehyde regulations for composite panels. All standard PlybooPure flooring and sheet goods have passed California's Section 01350 volatile organic compound (VOC)-emissions testing. CA01350 is the strictest indoor air quality criteria in existence. Most Smith & Fong products earn the U.S. Green Building Council's LEED (Leadership in Energy and Environmental Design) Credit MRc6 for Rapidly Renewable Materials, EQ 4.4: No Added Urea Formaldehyde for plywood and EQ 4.3 for flooring.

In 2008, Smith & Fong obtained the world's first non-wood FSC (Forest Stewardship Council) certification for its bamboo resource in China, providing third-party validation of a truly sustainable industry. Later that year PlybooPure FSC-certified bamboo flooring was selected as a "Top-10 Green Building Product" by BuildingGreen, publisher of Environmental Building News, the architecture and design industry's most respected source of information on sustainable building and design.

== Today ==
Today Smith & Fong Plyboo offers more than 50 types of bamboo plywood, about 25 choices of bamboo flooring, and a variety of tambour paneling and bamboo veneers. The company also manufactures a full line of coconut palm products under the brand name Durapalm that includes flooring, plywood, paneling and veneer.
