= BrightBuilt Barn =

Net Zero sustainable home in Maine

General information
- Type: Net Zero home
- Architectural style: Sustainable design
- Location: Rockport, Maine, U.S.
- Coordinates: 44°9′49″N 69°8′37″W
- Completed: 2008

Design and construction
- Awards: U.S. Green Building Council – Most Innovative Home Project of the Year
- Known for: LEED Platinum certification; Net Zero energy design; solar-powered superinsulated structure

BrightBuilt Barn is a Net Zero, LEED Platinum home in Rockport, Maine, completed in 2008 to demonstrate certain principles of sustainable building design and construction. It was named the Most Innovative Home Project of the Year by the U.S. Green Building Council and was featured in The New York Times, and a short documentary film. It is the subject of a 10-year retrospective review in the upcoming Northeast Sustainable Energy Association annual meeting in March 2018.

The project's goals were to demonstrate the principles of sustainable building for future structures and to bring together a critical mass of green designers and builders to help create an "ecosystem" of green buildings in Maine, modeled on the ecosystem of technology start-ups in Silicon Valley.

== Features ==
The Barn was superinsulated and solar-powered. An array of photovoltaic solar panels on the south-facing roof creates electricity for lighting, the solar hot water system pump, and the backup heat pump. The solar panels create enough excess energy to power both the Barn and other homes on the property. The Barn used LED lighting. The Barn feeds electricity into the local grid on sunny days and draws electricity from the grid at night.
