= Bamboo floor =

Type of flooring

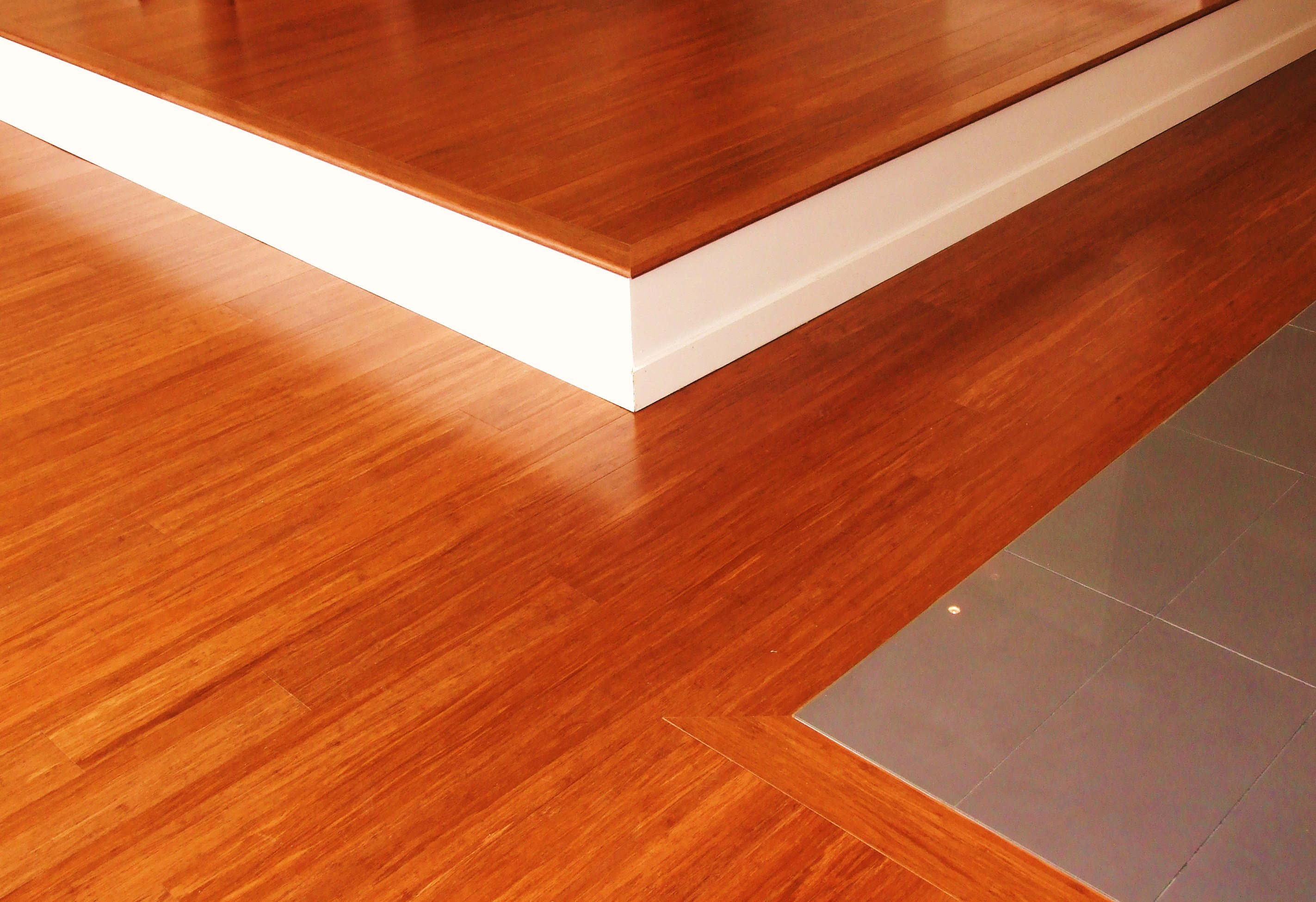
Strand Woven Bamboo Flooring

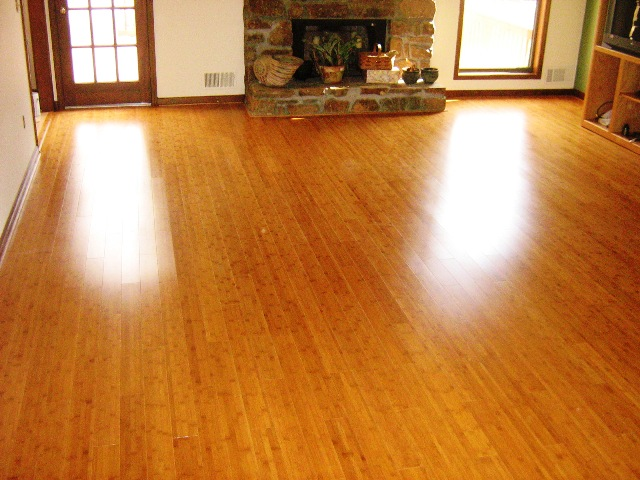
Bamboo flooring.

A bamboo floor is a type of flooring manufactured from the bamboo plant. The majority of today's bamboo flooring products originate in China and other portions of Asia. Moso bamboo is the species most commonly used for flooring.

== Characteristics ==
Bamboo has been used as an alternative for flooring because of its physical similarities to true hardwoods. Bamboo floor manufacturers and sellers promote its strength, durability, its eco-friendliness and its natural resistance to insects and moisture. The hardness of traditional bamboo flooring ranges from 1180 (carbonized horizontal) to around 1380 (natural), while newer manufacturing techniques including strand woven bamboo flooring range from 3000 to over 5000 using the Janka hardness test. Other flooring materials have comparable Janka ratings, with a higher number indicating a harder material: red oak (1290); white oak (1360); rock maple (1450); hickory (1820); and Brazilian Cherry / Jatoba (2350).

== Manufacture ==
Different forms of bamboo flooring exist. Each varies in its manufacturing process and differs largely based on economic viability and local preferences.

The most common form, particularly in southeast Asia, uses thin bamboo stems that are cut as flat as possible. They are cut to similar lengths and can be stained, varnished, or simply used as is. They are then nailed down to wooden beams or bigger pieces of bamboo stems. This form results in more space between each bamboo stem; flatness and tightness is not emphasized. This technique is usually used on stilted houses, resulting in better air circulation especially during the warmer summer months.

The manufactured bamboo flooring commonly found in North American markets is very highly processed. A Bamboo flooring is typically made by slicing mature bamboo poles or culms into strips. These culms are crosscut to length and then sliced into strips depending on the width desired. The outer skin and nodes are removed. To remove starch and sugars the strips of bamboo are boiled in a solution of boric acid or lime. The bamboo is then dried and planed. Natural bamboo color is similar to beech wood. If a darker color similar to oak is desired, the bamboo goes through a carbonizing process of steaming under controlled pressure and heat. The carbonizing process can reduce the floor's final hardness significantly compared to non-carbonized bamboo, rendering it softer than some pines and softer than more common red oak.

Most bamboo flooring uses a urea-formaldehyde (UF) adhesive in the lamination process. Though the use of UF resins, which emit volatile organic compounds (VOCs), is harmful to indoor air quality, bamboo flooring uses a relatively small amount compared with other materials, such as particleboards. Bamboo flooring products that avoid formaldehyde use are available, including some listed in the GreenSpec Directory. The panels are then heat pressed to cure the adhesive. The cured boards are then planed, sanded, and milled. Finally an ultraviolet curing lacquer is applied to the boards.

Manufactured bamboo floors are typically made available in planks with either vertical- or horizontal-grain orientation. In vertical bamboo floors, the component pieces are stood vertically on their narrowest edge and then press laminated side to side. The effect is a lined, almost uniform look to the surface of the finished floor plank. In horizontal bamboo floors, the slats are arranged in a horizontal direction, on their widest edge, and then joined side by side with adjacent pieces using a high-pressure laminate system. The characteristic nodes of the bamboo are visible on the finished horizontal surface.

Locking bamboo flooring is the easiest to install. Individual flooring planks have interlocking joints that click precisely into place. By combining plank alignment and color a lot of different styles can be produced.

Strand woven bamboo flooring can be refinished with a clear-coat quite easily, however applying a stain on-site can be challenging.

== Environmental impact ==
Bamboo is an eco-friendly, highly renewable source of material. As a grass, bamboo grows much faster than wood. Moso Bamboo is the primary species used for the manufacturing of flooring and plywood. Moso bamboo can grow up to 119 centimetres (47 in) in 24 hours and 24 metres (79 ft) high in 40 to 50 days. It takes about 3–5 years for bamboo to reach full maturity. Traditional hard woods can take 20–120 years to mature.

Bamboo can be harvested without the need to replant because the root system is left intact when it is harvested. The rhizome root structure has the ability to hold the soil in place preventing erosion. Rhizome root structures are horizontal stems that grow below the surface and help a plant reproduce vegetatively. Plants with rhizomes will colonize or spread laterally. In the United States of America, The Lacey Act recently strengthened the accountability in the sourcing of timber products. However enforcement is still in question.

Bamboo reaches maturity in five years which is the optimal age to harvest. In a sustainably harvested forest only 20% of the forest is harvested annually allowing for 100% harvest in a five-year period. In its natural environment it will need no irrigation, no pesticides, and no fertilizer. Bamboo has few pests so pesticides are not required. Bamboo certified to the standards of the Forest Stewardship Council (FSC) meets criteria for environmental sustainability and social responsibility, and several flooring products are available with this option. Bamboo can sequester up to 70% more carbon per year than a hardwood forest. All these factors keep the carbon footprint low.

The United States Green Building Council's LEED program allows points for the use of bamboo floors by virtue of it being a rapidly renewable resource.

Since the majority of bamboo timber comes from China, it has to be shipped to the international destinations by boat and then by truck to vendors. A study which compared the embodied energy (including transportation) of bamboo flooring from Hunan Province, China to Denver, Colorado favored locally sourced concrete above bamboo flooring due to the additional carbon costs associated with transport.

Controversy exists over agricultural and manufacturing issues related to the production of bamboo floors, including the environmental effects of deforestation in order to plant bamboo and the use of carcinogenic chemicals such as urea-formaldehyde in the glues used for lamination in some products.

Bamboo flooring has led to deforestation, as existing trees are cut down to be replaced with bamboo plantations; this results in soil erosion in the often hilly and mountainous areas occupied by forestland, along with a loss of biodiversity in the region as other flora and fauna are cleared for bamboo. Additionally, the use of pesticides, weed killers and fertilizers in bamboo production can have an effect on the environment.

During the manufacturing of bamboo floors, some manufacturers use urea-formaldehyde as the adhesive for bonding the bamboo strips. According to the stringent California Air Resources Board (CARB) standards there can be no more than 0.05 ppm (parts per million) of outgassed formaldehyde. According to the USGBC's LEED standard products with Urea-formaldehyde do not qualify for the EQ 4.4 Low-Emitting Products category. Manufacturers are now offering formaldehyde-free bamboo flooring, but they can claim that they have "no added urea-formaldehyde" without providing substantial proof. Manufacturers may make use of equipment that may in itself be dangerous and polluting. Some manufacturers may require their products to be registered under International Organization for Standardization (ISO) standards 9001 for quality control and 14001 for environmental management systems EMS, although these standards are not necessarily very high.

== Maintenance ==
Like most hardwood floors, bamboo floors should be treated carefully. When mopping, it is best to use a dust mop to remove the dust and grime. A stiff bristled broom can be used to remove more stubborn dirt from the crevices of the floor. Wet mops should be avoided on the bamboo flooring. When it is necessary to mop the floor, wring the mop out thoroughly to prevent any extra water from being released onto the floor. Cleaning detergents should be checked to make sure that they are safe for hard wood floors before they are added to the mop water. Many detergents contain a waxing agent which will dull the color of the flooring and leave behind a filmy glaze.
