= Andy Warhol's Index (Book) =

1967 book by Andy Warhol

- Author: Andy Warhol
- Language: English
- Genre: Artists' books pop-up book
- Publisher: Random House
- Publication date: November 15, 1967
- Publication place: United States

Andy Warhol's Index (Book) is an artist's book by American artist Andy Warhol, published by Random House in 1967. The book documents Warhol's Factory scene through photographs, interviews, prose, and a range of interactive elements, including a flexi disc, pop-up pages, a detachable balloon, and dissolvable paper. It was reissued as a facsimile by Phaidon Press in 2026.

== Background ==
By the mid-1960s, Pop artist Andy Warhol had expanded his practice beyond silkscreen painting to include underground films and music. His silver-painted Factory studio had become the center of his filmmaking activities.

Warhol's approach was characterized by his use of existing images and objects such as Campbell's soup cans, Brillo boxes, and film stills of actress Marilyn Monroe. John Raymond of The Atlanta Journal noted in 1967 that, as a "creative artist he is original in that he eschews the original and the creative. His method is simply to show us things" and thereby blurring the distinction between ordinary objects and works of art. This approach extended to his filmmaking and, subsequently, to his publications.

Andy Warhol's Index (Book) brought together elements of Warhol's artistic and social activities at the Factory. Rather than functioning as a conventional art book, it presented photographs of Warhol and people in his circle alongside interviews, prose, audio recordings, pop-up pages, a detachable silver balloon, and other interactive components. The resulting publication treated the book itself as something to be experienced and manipulated, extending Warhol's interest in transforming familiar forms of mass-media and everyday objects into works of art.

== Production ==
Archivist Billy Name was closely involved in the production of Andy Warhol's Index (Book). The book was originally titled the project Andy Warhol's Index, intending the word "index" as a reference to both Warhol's films and the Index of Forbidden Books maintained by the Catholic Church. The proposed concept was to create an index of films that audiences should see rather than a list of films prohibited or discouraged by the Church.

The publisher Random House objected to Name's proposed title because the project was intended to be a "book," prompting him to change the title to Andy Warhol's Index (Book). Name explained, "You have to understand that 'Andy Warhol's Index (Book)' isn't really a book. It's an index. It's an index to the world of Andy Warhol. It's an index to Andy, really."

Name also selected the texts included in the publication. He later recalled that none of the interviews had been conducted specifically for the book; instead, he chose previously published interviews from a collection of material concerning the Factory. The interviews were chosen because they provided substantial amounts of text and represented what he considered the more "charming" or unconventional aspects of the Factory.

Name supplied photographs for the project in photostat form, which Warhol liked and which were retained in the book. The use of photostats contributed to the stark black-and-white appearance of the photographs. Additional photographs were taken by Nat Finkelstein and Stephen Shore.

Christopher Cerf, an editor at Random House, recalled that the production layouts contained numerous markings for the printer and engraver. After the layout had been completed, Warhol viewed the marked-up material and remarked, "that's beautiful." Name replied, "now you see how we work."

A statement by Ingrid Superstar, one of Warhol's superstars, reading "Andy loves mistakes, this wasn't rehearsed," was included in the book. According to Cerf, Warhol later decided that the passage was inconsistent with the tone of the book and wanted it removed from a subsequent edition.

== Contents ==
The book combines photographs of Warhol and figures associated with the Factory, including Gerard Malanga, Lou Reed, Edie Sedgwick, and International Velvet, with several interactive and multimedia elements. Among these is a small piece of dissolvable paper attached to one of the final pages. Printed repeatedly with Warhol's name, the paper contains instructions directing the reader to tear it out and place it in warm water, causing it to dissolve into individual letters of his name. Another page features a photograph of Warhol standing on a roof holding a large silver balloon; the balloon is attached to the page and can be removed and inflated, revealing the word "INDEX" in purple.

Other pages contain three-dimensional and movable elements, including a double-page pop-up depicting a medieval castle under siege with the caption "We're attacked constantly," a pop-out paper airplane, and a pop-up reproduction of a Hunt's tomato paste can. Additional interactive features include a page that produces a Bronx cheer when swung outward, a squeaking page, a hexagonal kite attached to a page by string and covered with photographs of a man in drag, and a triple-page foldout depicting Warhol's profile with three interchangeable noses.

The book includes a tear-out flexi disc containing audio material that could be played on a phonograph. The disc features excerpts from tape recordings made by Warhol of singer Nico in conversation with poet Rene Ricard, as well as a recording of the Factory crowd talking over the Velvet Underground's "I'm Waiting for the Man."

Three interviews are included in the book. One was conducted by Joseph Freeman, a student at Sheepshead Bay High School in Brooklyn, who interviewed Warhol. A second interview was conducted by a German reporter at the Factory, while the third focused specifically on Warhol's 1966 film Chelsea Girls.

== Publication ==
Andy Warhol's Index (Book) was published in New York by Random House on November 15, 1967. The original edition was issued in both hardcover and paperback, priced at $12.95 and $4.95, respectively. A limited signed edition was offered for $50.

The book was printed by Graphics International in Japan, where most of its components were hand-assembled. The exceptions were the cover of the $12.95 edition and the labels bearing Warhol's name that were designed to be dissolved in warm water.

== Critical reception ==
Publishers Weekly characterized the book as a "great game" for adults, praising its "shock-value" and the "paper gadgets that pop up between the pages." The review noted the "cryptic text, but it accomplishes wonders of not saying anything, in a mad way. This is easily the gadget book of the year, grotesque, ingenious, fascinating, but not for all."

Eliot Fremont-Smith, a book critic for The New York Times, questioned the book's originality, writing that it "might itself have been an entry (in the origami category), had it been wholly constructed of paper. However, various plastics, rubber and metal are included in the package—which, indeed, comes as a package, in a see-through bag. Nor does it seem truly original: What isn't by now Warhol Factory Banal-Traditional is strongly reminiscent of Flair magazine."

Robert Fulford of the Toronto Star wrote that "Warhol having conquered the art galleries and the art movie houses, has moved now into book production. The result is not invigorating (like his art shows), or revealing (like his remarkable film, The Chelsea Girls). It's only a curiosity, and a very expensive one. Still, I understand it's selling well already."

William French of The Globe and Mail argued that the book represented a shift from books intended primarily to be read toward books intended to be "experienced." He described Andy Warhol's Index (Book) as a "wild and funny essay in non-meaning. The book is an extension of Warhol's pop art and underground movies, which means it's illogical, frustrating and exhilarating. I suspect that it will have considerable influence on the future development of books; it goes several steps beyond Marshall McLuhan's The Medium is the Massage, from which it is a natural progression."

== Legacy ==
The Metropolitan Museum of Art and the Museum of Modern Art in New York and the Toledo Museum of Art in Toledo hold copies of the book in their collections.

=== Facsimile edition ===
In 2026, Phaidon Press, in collaboration with Melcher Media and the Andy Warhol Foundation for the Visual Arts, published a facsimile edition of Andy Warhol's Index (Book). The edition reproduces the 1967 book, including its interactive elements, holographic cover, and clear plastic packaging.

The reproduction was developed over more than five years. The production team worked from surviving copies of the original book and original production materials. The team also secured rights to photographs by Name, Shore, and Finkelstein.

Some of the original interactive elements required new manufacturing methods. The pop-ups were reproduced using sturdier paper, while the production team located a company capable of manufacturing the flexi disc. The silver balloon, whose original material had deteriorated and adhered to the pages of surviving copies, was reconstructed using materials based on descriptions of the original.

The 2026 edition is a 48-page hardcover and includes an essay by Charles Melcher discussing the history and influence of the book. The edition carries ISBN 978-1-83729-341-4.
