= Ecoleasing =

Recycling of rented goods after use

Ecoleasing is a system in which goods (mainly from the technical cycle, i.e. appliances, ...) are rented to a client for a certain period of time after which he returns the goods so the company that made it can recycle the materials.

== Terminology ==
The term ecoleasing has been used by William McDonough and Michael Braungart in their book Cradle_to_Cradle: Remaking the Way We Make Things. It is used to distinct itself from regular leasing in that:

- the operation is similar to regular purchasing of goods, so not requiring a contract to be made up as with leasing
- it is done with appliances and other products used for the household, rather than with land or very expensive products (cars, ...)
- the period of time the product is rented would be about the same as the lifespan of the product, so it can only be rented once before it is taken back by the company to recover the materials (and to create another product with it)

== Examples ==
An example of ecoleasing is a lease of a TV set. In this case, a consumer signs a contract with the TV manufacturer. According to the contract, the consumer has a right to use the TV for e.g. 15,000 hours. After this period he returns the TV to the company, which then recycles it. Ecoleasing is usually done with appliances and other relatively cheap household products. It is hardly ever used for land, real estate, and expensive products.

== Advantages ==
- Since materials are reclaimed, fewer or no materials end up in landfills, or require other forms of waste disposal. As such, it is quite environmental.
- Materials are recovered by which the company can make new products, so the material costs for this new product are much lower for the company.
- Since new products can be made at a lower expense, the sale price of these products can also be comparatively lower than similar products made by the competition (if they use a system of purchasing the goods)

== See also ==
- Car leasing: use in circular economy
