= Hannover Principles =

The Hannover Principles is a set of statements about designing buildings and objects with forethought about their environmental impact, their effect on the sustainability of growth, and their overall impact on society. They were first formulated by William McDonough and Michael Braungart for planning Expo 2000 in Hanover and are presented in a copyrighted 1992 document.

The principles are:

1. Insist on the right of humanity and nature to co-exist in a healthy, supportive, diverse and sustainable condition.
2. Recognize interdependence.
3. Respect relationships between spirit and matter.
4. Accept responsibility for the consequences of design decisions upon human well-being, the viability of natural systems and their right to co-exist.
5. Create safe objects of long-term value.
6. Eliminate the concept of waste.
7. Rely on natural energy flows.
8. Understand the limitations of design.
9. Seek constant improvement by the sharing of knowledge.
