= Dhairya Dand =

Indian-American inventor and artist

Dhairya Dand FRSA
- Born: Nashik, India
- Education: Massachusetts Institute of Technology, Industrial Design Centre, Victoria Jubilee Technological Institute
- Known for: Futurism, sensory research, wearables, social systems, Alexa, ICTD, educational toys
- Notable work: SuperShoes, Alexa, Obake, Cheers, ThinkerToys, icon, Lokshahi
- Awards: 2023 Fellow of the Royal Society of Arts, 2014 The Smithsonian Finalist for the Smithsonian National Award, 2014 Wired UK Innovation Fellowship, 2016 Forbes 30 under 30 in Manufacturing and Energy, 2015 Forbes 30 under 30 in Design, 2015 Elle 20 names to know, 2015 Vogue Cool People, 2015 Future of StoryTelling Fellowship, 2014 INK Fellowship, 2013 Boston Globe Top 25 Innovators, 2013 Contagious Ones to watch in Technology

Dhairya Dand (/dhere-YA DAN-d/; born 1989) is an Indian-American inventor and artist based in New York City.

His work investigates the human body as a medium for computation; new materials as a tool to embody interactions; and design as a vehicle for mindfulness. His work takes the form of devices, objects, installations, new technology and materials.

Currently, Dand is a principal at ODD Industries, a futurist factory and lab in NYC. Previously an artist in residence at NEW INC and on the scientific advisory board of the X Prize Foundation. Dand was an invited member of the W3C Standards Committee which defines standards for the Internet. He was a key member of Amazon's secretive Concept Lab which invented several Alexa devices. He has taught conceptual design-based courses at New York University, Carnegie Mellon School of Design and the MIT Design Innovation Workshops.

Dand is a graduate of the Media, Arts and Sciences program at the MIT Media Lab.

== Early life ==
Dand was born in Nasik in a interfaith multilingual family: his father was a Kutchi Jain, while his mother belonged to the Marathi Saraswat community. His father, a plumber by profession, did not complete high school, while his mother worked as a Sanskrit teacher in Mumbai before the family moved to Nasik.

He attended Veermata Jijabai Technological Institute for undergraduate studies in computer science and the Industrial Design Centre for courses in design. Dand later lived in Singapore, Phnom Penh, Tokyo, and London before moving to the United States to study at the Massachusetts Institute of Technology.

== Works ==
Dand's inventions include sensorial interfaces, smart devices, display technologies, Alexa, social systems, prosthesis, bio-based architecture, educational toys, and emotional robots.

In SuperShoes, Dand created insoles that work on a tickling interface. The shoes tickle the feet and guide the wearer across the city. The insoles sync with the user's smartphone for location, data, and access to the user's personality preferences. The insoles provide navigation and reminders and promote taking mindful breaks and discovering new places in a city.

In Programmable Hair, Dand made a device worn on the hair that allows the wearer to program their hairstyle, either by choosing from a library of hairstyles or by taking a picture of someone else's hairstyle.

With Obake, Dand created a 2.5D elastic computer display technology that has shape memory. The display can be physically deformed, stretched, pulled, and pushed. It remembers shapes and can self-actuate.

While in Seattle, Dand was part of Amazon's secretive Concept Lab, where he is credited for key inventions such as Alexa devices. Some of his inventions which are public involve invisible interfaces and using hand gestures to use the air as a medium for computing.

Dand's Cheers are alcohol-aware ice cubes that detect how much a person is drinking. The cubes change color depending on how much alcohol a person has consumed. The cubes also strobe in response to ambient music.

Dand designed a bio-building that responds and reacts to its environment. During the day, cells in the building's "membranes" open up, allowing for more ventilation; at night, the cells generate and conserve warmth.

Dand's ThinkerToys are modular educational toys made from e-waste which later led to an NGO called openTOYS. By plugging in these modules, a keyboard can be used as a piano, a mouse for language learning, and speakers as storytelling devices.

One of Dand's early works was Lokshahi, which was a m-governance system for political transparency in rural India.

Dand has also worked on several accessibility-related inventions for emotional communication, autism and motor impairment.

== Awards and exhibits ==
Dand was named in the Forbes magazine's 30 under 30 list in 2016 and 2015. In 2015 Future of StoryTelling named him as a fellow. Dand was one of Elle magazine's 20 names to know and Vogue's Cool People list. In 2014 Wired UK named him as an Innovation fellow. INK Talks named him as an INK Fellow. Dand's work was selected by the Smithsonian as one of finalist for the National Design Award. In 2013, Dand was one of the Boston Globe's Top 25 Innovators.

He has presented at W3C's Annual Summit, Tencent's WE Summit, Tokyo Designers Week, Wired UK Innovation Conference, INK Talks, TEDx events including TEDxHamburg and TEDxBerlin, the ICA and the MIT Media Lab.

Dand's work has been exhibited at the prestigious Victoria and Albert Museum (V&A) in London, MIT Museum in Cambridge, Singapore Arts House and at international conferences including UIST St Andrews, CHI Paris, and in TEI Barcelona.

== See also ==
- Indians in the New York City metropolitan area
