= 12 month rule =

Taxation rule in the United States

In the field of taxation in the United States, the 12 month rule refers to the capitalization of property or assets that provide only short-term benefits. The 12 month rule makes it unnecessary to capitalize the cost of purchase or production of anything with a useful life of less than a year, although it is not without exception. Prop. Reg. 1.263(a)-2(d)(4)(i) serves to codify the 12 month rule and the generally accepted view that capitalization is only required for costs related to the purchase or production of fixed assets that will continue to provide a benefit over the course of several years, or at least for a time significantly longer than the taxable year.
