= Latency (customer) =

Latency in the retail sense is defined as the time between two customer events, such as a first and second purchase.

For example, if Sam buys a pair of casual shoes on July 1, 2012, and then returns to buy dress shoes on August 1, 2012, then his latency can be calculated as 32 days (calculation).

Not all customer events need be purchase related. One may calculate latency between visits to a website, responses in a phone or direct mail campaign, etc.

An example of latency between purchases may be seen in the graph of sample data here.

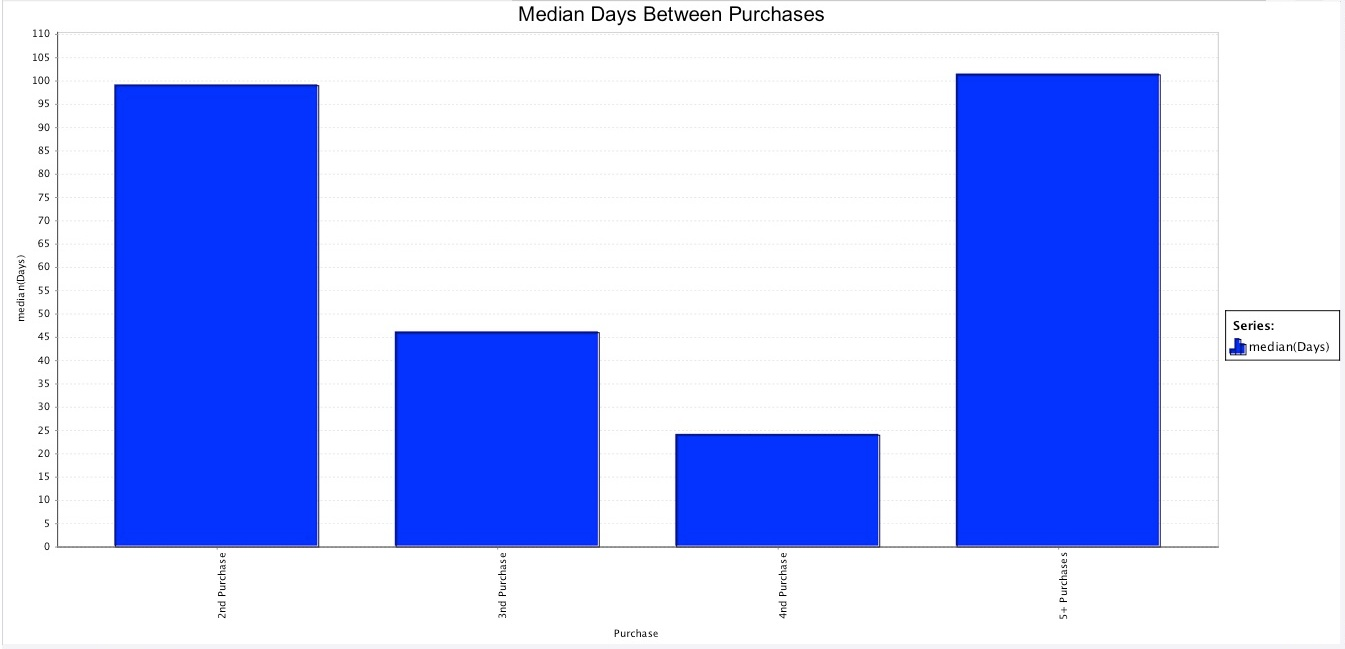

== Sources ==
- Measure Potential Customer Value Using Recency and Latency [February 10], [2010]
- Customer Latency [August 22] [2001]
- Using Latency to Improve Customer Retention
