= NASA Sustainability Base =

Coordinates: 37°24′40″N 122°3′42″W

NASA Sustainability Base is located on the campus of NASA's Ames Research Center in Moffett Field, California. It was named in recognition of the first human outpost on the moon, Tranquility Base. It was designed to exhibit and test the latest energy-saving technologies as part of the federal government's drive to eliminate fossil-fuel consumption in all new government buildings by 2030. The building was not initially conceived as a "sustainability base", but associate director Steven Zornestzer worked with architect William McDonough to create an energy-efficient building for the 21st century. McDonough, previously published "Cradle to Cradle", which argued for building architecture to move out of the "life cycle" model (birth, use, and disposal) and become a more circular system, lasting for indefinite periods of time. This belief, along with other influences from looking at urban design and architecture through a biological perspective, provided inspiration for the NASA Sustainability Base. Energy-saving features include water recycling, fuel cell electricity generation, natural lighting, solar panels, and a geothermal well system. The building takes advantage of the sun's arc and winds from San Francisco Bay in addition to being able to adjust to changes in sunlight, temperature, wind, and occupancy. Also, the building had normal budget and actually a shorter than normal production time. One of the nation's greenest buildings, the NASA Sustainability Base was awarded the U.S. Green Building Council's Leadership in Energy and Environmental Design (LEED) Platinum status. It was completed in December 2012 and cost $27.8 million.

The building also employs biofeedback systems for employees, providing an energy monitoring dashboard to review personal energy consumption habits over time. Work areas are open and collaborative, with a few private offices, "huddle" rooms, and quiet study and library areas. Waste and refuse are either recycled or collected. They are testing a gray water recycling system, using a three-stage process to reclaim water from sinks and showers. This, along with other water-saving features, have reduced this building's potable water demand by 85-90% of a similarly-sized office building.

== Design ==
The orientation and the lunar-shape design of this 50,000 square foot base allows it to take advantage of the prevailing winds of San Francisco Bay and the sun’s arc. The sustainability base receives an unobstructed flow of air, due to structural supports on the exterior of the building. The building’s narrow width of 54 feet and its floor-to-ceiling windows also allow daylight to reach every inch of the floor.

== Sustainability ==
The sustainability base harnesses space technology, commercially available technologies, and the surrounding environment to leave virtually no ecological footprint. For example, the building features automated windows that help flush the building with cool air at night and a ground-source heat pump system. The building is also equipped with a water recovery system, in which the water used to flush the toilets is filtered and used for irrigation. As a result, the building uses about 90 percent less potable water than conventional buildings of comparable size. The building is also able to generate more energy than it needs to operate, due to the Bloom Energy Box and photovoltaic solar panels onsite. To encourage further energy conservation at the base, each employee has a personal energy dashboard that captures their energy usage.

== Awards ==
In April 2012, the sustainability base received LEED Platinum, the highest level of Leadership in Energy and Environmental Design certification. LEED is a worldwide green building certification program that includes a set of ratings for the construction, design, and maintenance of green buildings, aimed at encouraging building owners to use resources efficiently and be environmentally responsible. The sustainability base has received other national awards including the 2010 U.S. General Services Administration Award for Green Innovation; the 2011 White House Greengov “Lean, Clean and Green Award”; and the Center for Environmental Innovation and Leadership “Leadership in Innovation Award.”
