= Downcycling =

Recycling waste into products of lower quality

Downcycling symbol

Downcycling, or cascading, is the recycling of waste where the recycled material is of lower quality and functionality than the original material. Often, this is due to the accumulation of tramp elements in secondary metals, which may exclude the latter from high-quality applications. For example, steel scrap from end-of-life vehicles is often contaminated with copper from wires and tin from coating. This contaminated scrap yields a secondary steel that does not meet the specifications for automotive steel and therefore, it is mostly applied in the construction sector.

== Origin and effect ==
Downcycling can help to keep materials in use, reduce consumption of raw materials, and avoid the energy usage, greenhouse gas emissions, air pollution, and water pollution of primary production and resource extraction.

Downcycling of steel from scrap cars into buildings. Vehicle steel scrap, which is contaminated with other metals, is often remelted into construction steel that can contain up to 0.4% of copper.

The first documented use of the term downcycling was by Reiner Pilz in an interview by Thornton Kay in SalvoNEWS in 1994.

We talked about the impending EU Demolition Waste Streams directive. "Recycling, he said, "I call it downcycling. They smash bricks, they smash everything. What we need is upcycling where old products are given more value not less." He despairs of the German situation and recalls the supply of a large quantity of reclaimed woodblock from an English supplier for a contract in Nuremberg while just down the road a load of similar blocks was scrapped. It was a pinky looking aggregate with pieces of handmade brick, old tiles and discernible parts of useful old items mixed with crushed concrete. Is this the future for Europe?

The term downcycling was also used by William McDonough and Michael Braungart in their 2002 book Cradle to Cradle: Remaking the Way We Make Things.

As we have noted, most recycling is actually downcycling; it reduces the quality of a material over time. When plastics other than those found in soda and water bottles are recycled, they are mixed with different plastics to produce a hybrid of lower quality, which is then molded into something amorphous and cheap, such as a park bench or a speed bump... Aluminum is another valuable but constantly downcycled material. The typical soda can consists of two kinds of aluminum: the walls are composed of aluminum, manganese alloy with some magnesium, plus coatings and paint, while the harder top is aluminum magnesium alloy. In conventional recycling these materials are melted together, resulting in a weaker—and less useful—product.

== Similar operations ==
Downcycling is related to but different from 'open-loop recycling'. While downcycling implies quality loss the term open-loop recycling denotes a situation where the secondary material is used in a different product system than the original material; it thus comprises both upcycling and downcycling. A detailed discussion on the relation between downcycling, open loop recycling and their environmental impact is provided by Geyer et al. (2015). They write that "Poor product design and EOL management can lead to recycled materials of poor quality, which, in turn, limits the applications these materials can be used in." They also argue that "closed-loop recycling neither intrinsically displaces more primary material owing to multiple loops (quantity argument) nor per se generates higher environmental benefits on a unit basis (quality argument)." The reason for their argument lies in the necessity to include the product system of the target application, in which the recycled material is used or not, into the assessment of overall primary material demand and environmental impact.

== See also ==
- Building material – Material which is used for construction purposes
- Industrial ecology – Study of matter and energy flow in industrial systems
- Backward compatibility – Technological ability to interact with older technologies
- Forward compatibility – Type of design interoperability
- Planned obsolescence – Product design with limited useful life
- Repurposing – Using object intended for one purpose in alternative way
