= FOST =

FOST may refer to:

- Force océanique stratégique, the strategic submarine forces of the French Navy
- Flag Officer Sea Training (India) in the Indian Navy
- Flag Officer Sea Training (Pakistan) in the Pakistani Navy
- Flag Officer Sea Training (United Kingdom) in the Royal Navy (United Kingdom)
- Future of StoryTelling, an annual event dedicated to storytelling

Fost may refer to:

- Fošt, a settlement in northeastern Slovenia
- Sant Fost de Campsentelles, a village in the province of Barcelona, Spain

== See also ==
- Föst
