= Hedonic music consumption model =

The hedonic music consumption model was created by music researchers Kathleen Lacher and Richard Mizeski in 1994. Their goal was to use this model to examine the responses that listening to rock music creates, and to find if these responses influenced the listener's intention to later purchase the music. The article begins with a discussion of why the issue of music consumption is important. Music is then explored as an aesthetic product, prior to a discussion of what hedonic consumption is, as well as its origins, and concludes with an in-depth look at the model itself.

== Music consumption ==
Music is consumed in a variety of ways, through the radio, television, and internet, as well as through concerts and performances. North and Hargreaves have suggested "record buying is perhaps the ultimate behavioural measure of musical preference, involving the purchaser's time, effort, and money" (p. 282). The study of music purchase and consumption was quite limited as of the early 1990s, as only a few academic studies had investigated this topic at that point in time.

The impact of illegal music downloads and file sharing has again brought the issue of music purchases to the forefront. Much popular press and current academic work is being devoted to this topic. The latest report by the International Federation of the Phonographic Industry (IFPI) mentions four academic studies in particular (e.g., Zenter, 2003; Liebowitz, 2006; Michael, 2006; Rob & Waldfogel, 2006;) that have examined file-sharing as having a negative impact on the record industry. Not all academics believe to be true however, as the Oberholzer & Strumpf (2004) study brought a different viewpoint to this topic in an article published in the prestigious Journal of Political Economy. These Harvard Business School professors received considerable media attention with the study's conclusion "the empirical evidence on sales displacement is mixed…the papers using actual file-sharing data, suggest that piracy and music sales are largely unrelated" (pp. 24–25).

== Music and hedonic consumption ==
Hedonic consumption was first introduced as an alternative to the traditional consumer behavior model by in the early 1980s. Conventional consumer research has traditionally used the black box approach and has historically analyzed the consumption activities of product categories such as package goods and major consumer durables. Hedonic consumption focuses on products such as the arts, music, and cultural events such as rock concerts, fashion shows and films. These "experience" types of products tend to involve individual preferences that can generate certain emotions, feelings and behaviors.

Music is an aesthetic product as it often provides an emotional or spiritually moving experience specific to an individual. Holbrook also states that music is appreciated primarily for its internal essence as opposed to being viewed strictly as an objective product. However, consumer research literature focusing on these types of products often uses the terms "aesthetic" and "hedonic" almost interchangeably. Charters (2006) points out "hedonic consumption is essentially about pleasure" (p. 240), and that pleasure is but one aspect of the overall aesthetic experience. He also notes that "popular culture works may have ‘layers of meaning' for consumers" as they may convey symbolic meaning for people in significance or emotion of some type. From a retailing standpoint, aesthetic products are characterized as having a wide range of product offerings in the marketplace.

As Hirschman and Holbrook point out, hedonic consumption expands upon the traditional definition of consumer behavior through its inclusion of "the multi-sensory, fantasy and emotive aspects of one's experience with products…including tastes, sounds, scents, tactile impressions and visual images" (p. 92). These types of experience-oriented products often involve "fun, amusement, fantasy, arousal, sensory stimulation, and enjoyment" (p. 37). In addition, hedonic consumption often uses ethnic background, social class and gender to help determine the different consumer emotions and fantasies around a product.

== The origins of hedonic consumption ==
The study of the hedonic consumption as an academic field began in the late 1970s. It originated out of different behavioral science fields, including sociology, philosophy, psycholinguistics, and psychology. Hirschman and Holbrook considered key contributions to come from two fields of prior academic research. The first was the motivation research of the 1950s, "which focused on the emotional aspects of products and fantasies that the products could arouse and/or fulfill" (p. 93). Ernest Dichter was a key figure in this field of research which was popular from the 1950s to the 1970s. One of the major shortcomings of the early motivation research was that many of its clinical studies lacked rigor and validity.

Hedonic consumption also owes a big debt to the academic field of product symbolism research. One of the important contributors to this academic field includes Sidney J. Levy, who is now the Coca-Cola Distinguished Professor of Marketing at Eller College of Management at the University of Arizona. He wrote the groundbreaking article "Symbols for Sale" which first appeared in the July–August 1959 edition of the Harvard Business Review. Levy observed "consumers buy products and brands not only for so-called functional reasons but for the various ‘symbolic meanings' that their consumption provides" (p. 198). Another early Levy article "Symbolism and Life Style" was originally published in the December 1963 American Marketing Association's Toward Scientific Marketing Winter Conference Proceedings. In this article, Levy expanded upon his earlier writings by urging marketers to consider "the sum of an individual's consumption of symbolic goods and services as a 'lifestyle'" (p. 199). Levy was interested in the development of a taxonomy that would allow marketers to be able to think more systematically about how to meaningfully fulfill the needs of their individual consumers.

== Explanation ==
Hirschman and Holbrook's research in the hedonic consumption field first led Kathleen Lacher to begin to explore music as a hedonic consumption product in the late 1980s. Her goal was to try to understand the factors behind why people bought music. In 1994, she joined forces with Richard Mizerski to conduct an experiment that explored music purchase intentions. These professors proposed a theoretical model they named the "model of music consumption and purchase intention". Their basic premise was that people buy music because of the "experience that the music creates by itself or because music can enhance other experiences, whether it is an individual or shared experiences with others" (p. 367).

== Model building blocks ==
Lacher and Mizerski based their experiments on previous music research that was conducted in the fields of music education and psychology. They tested music on four "responses" to see what, if any, had any effect on music purchase intentions.

1. Emotion - or the feelings people experience when hearing music, which usually range across a scale extending from rage to love. Emotion is also considered to be one of the primary factors in music appreciation as well as a potential factor in the purchasing process.
2. Sensory – music often invokes a raw physical response to move physically or sway to the music. Yingling describes this primal process as "an awareness to the listener's need to either move physically towards or away" from the music source.
3. Imaginal – This response often involves "images, memories or situations that music evokes" (p. 109). The imaginal response also tends to invoke memories of past events, or to imagine events that could take place in the future.
4. Analytical – This response often involves pre-conceived expectations about the music itself. Listeners tend to separate music by identifying of the technical aspects of the music (e.g., tempo, dynamics, etc.); type, through music genre (e.g., rock, folk, etc.); and intrinsic, through other personalized listener factors (e.g., contemporary, religious, etc.).

Next, these first four inputs link together along a pathway towards music purchase using four additional factors:

5. Experiential response – or the experience that one has in becoming absorbed or involved in the music.
6. The overall affective behavior – This is more than just emotion, which "tends to be characterized by short duration intense reactionary episodes attributed to a specific cause. Lacher and Mizerski considered the affective domain to capture the various interactions between basic emotions, emotional patterns, as well as moods and motivations, as well as the previously identified analytical and imagery responses as well.
7. Reexperience the music – This revolves around the listener's need to want to listen to the music again. The researchers considered this to be a key factor of music purchase. In other words, the listener is motivated enough to purchase the product in order to control the type of music played, as well as where, when, and with whom the music is experienced in the future.
8. Purchase intention is the ultimate outcome of the hedonic music consumption model purchase. Lacher and Mizerski hypothesized that each of the first four inputs could also lead directly to any of the factors in the second cluster as well.

== The revised significant-paths-only hedonic music consumption model ==
Lacher and Mizerski conducted experiments with college students to determine if the directly linked relationships they had proposed between these eight factors stayed consistent in ultimately predicting rock music purchases. They picked this music genre as previous research suggested most recorded music was bought by people between the ages of 10 and 25, and that this was the preferred genre of the students in test groups.

Lacher and Mizerski found during the course of the tests that their hypotheses were not as consistent as they had thought, and in some cases, the relationships were not direct. Still they were able to make some general conclusions about why people buy music. They revised their original model to create a significant-paths-only model hedonic music consumption model detailing the revised relationships between the factors. The emotional response was broken down to include six different music dimensions that ranged from calm to exuberant. In short, their end goal was to "foster a systematic system of why people purchase music so we can better understand this important marketplace behavior" (p. 375). One of the ways that Lacher and Mizerski believed that this hedonic music consumption model might prove helpful in terms of future research was to explain the consumption of other "hedonic" products such as books, movies, plays, paintings and sports events" (p. 377).

== See also ==
- Hedonism
