= Charles Melcher =

American businessman (born 1965)

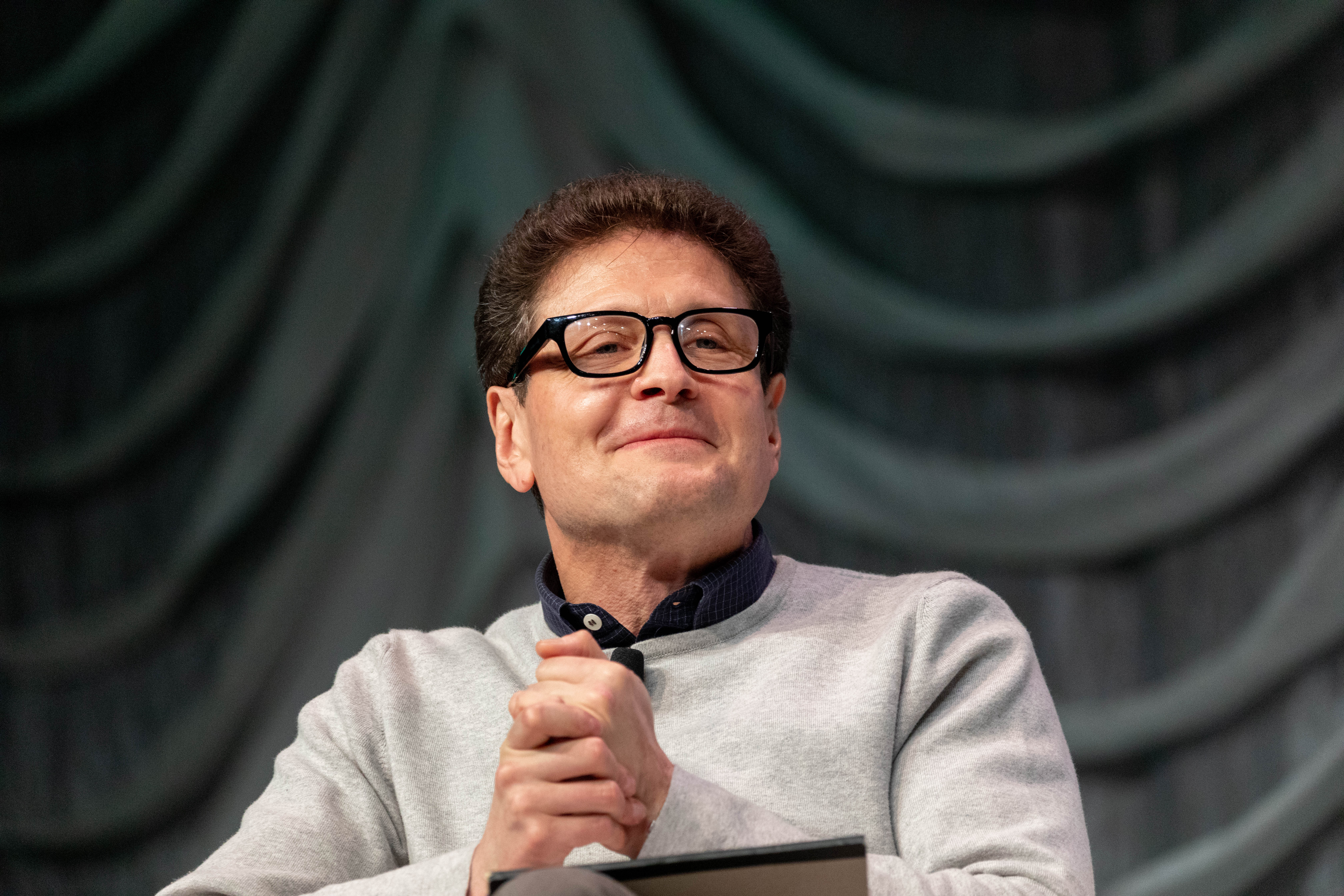
- Melcher in 2019
- Born: January 19, 1965 (age 60); New York City, U.S.
- Occupation: Publisher
- Known for: Melcher Media

Charles Melcher (born 1965) is a creator, curator, and thought leader in the storytelling and technology space, as well as an early-stage investor in media and technology companies. He is the Founder and CEO of Melcher Media and the Founder and Director of Future of Storytelling.

== Biography ==
=== Early life ===
Charles Melcher was born on January 19, 1965, and raised in New York City, where he attended the Ethical Culture Fieldston School. He graduated from Yale University with a Bachelor of Arts degree in 1988. He was a two-time Junior Olympic Fencing champion, in 1980 and 1981, in épée.

=== Melcher Media ===
After graduating, Melcher launched Melcher Press, Inc., creating custom print materials for schools such as Dartmouth College, Wesleyan University, and Yale University. In 1993, he renamed the company Melcher Media, Inc., and one of its first jobs was to create a publishing imprint for MTV, MTV Books. Today, the company is a creative content studio that helps authors and companies tell their stories via illustrated books, apps, websites, films, events, and immersive experiences. The company helps international brands (Microsoft, Facebook, Amazon, Apple, PepsiCo, GE, and Lexus), media companies (Netflix, HBO, Time Warner, NBC, USA, TBS, and Condé Nast), and individual authors (Oprah Winfrey, Martha Stewart, Lin-Manuel Miranda, J.J. Abrams, Kobe Bryant, and Eminem) to tell their stories across a variety of media. Melcher Media has over 13 million books in print, including more than 30 New York Times best sellers.

=== Future of Storytelling ===
In 2012, Melcher founded Future of StoryTelling, a live events and content business focused on cutting-edge developments in storytelling and technology. FoST began as an invitation-only Summit for 300 people that went on to expand to a week-long summit and festival for nearly 6,000 people. The FoST Summit draws a mix of thinkers and practitioners from diverse fields who are shaping storytelling in the twenty-first century. Past FoST Summit speakers, workshop leaders, and performers have included Disney animator and director Glen Keane; Angela Ahrendts, former SVP of Retail at Apple; filmmaker Darren Aronofsky; choreographer Bill T. Jones; musician and band leader Jon Batiste; Vimeo CEO Anjali Sud; Niantic CEO John Hanke; and GE CMO Linda Boff.

Inc. magazine named the FoST Summit one of the “10 most Innovative Conferences of 2016,” Adweek named it among the “7 Emerging Conferences Every Advertising Profession Should Know About.” in 2017, and Forbes named it one of the “5 Most Inspiring Conferences of 2018.”

FoST also produces content throughout the year, including storytelling workshops; curated exhibitions with local and international organizations; a monthly newsletter, “FoST in Thought,” and the bi-weekly FoST Podcast. FoST also developed and teaches a storytelling curriculum and consults on storytelling best practices for companies such as Microsoft, Ford, NBCUniversal, and others.

=== Future of StoryTelling Podcast ===
Melcher is the host of the bi-weekly Future of StoryTelling Podcast. Launched in 2020, it features conversations with some of the world's most notable storytellers from diverse backgrounds. Past guests have included author Margaret Atwood, actor Neil Patrick Harris, musician Jacob Collier, political commentator and activist Van Jones, actor Rainn Wilson, and Oskar Eustis, artistic director of the Public Theater.

=== Thought Leadership ===
Melcher speaks regularly on the intersection of storytelling and technology at conferences, festivals, and conventions worldwide. Past engagements have included SXSW, C2 Montréal, EY Innovation Realized, the Milken Institute Global Conference, and Phi Centre's The New Storytellers.

=== Theodore Roosevelt Presidential Library ===
In 2019, Melcher and FoST were engaged as the official Executive Storytellers for the Theodore Roosevelt Presidential Library in Medora, North Dakota, which is currently scheduled to open to the public on July 4, 2026. Melcher also helps to run the Content Studio for the Library. In these roles, FoST helps to oversee the various elements of the institution's storytelling, from print and collateral materials, to interpretive design, to creating original content for the Content Studio.

=== Push Pop Press ===
Melcher was a founding partner, along with Mike Matas and Kimon Tsinteris, of Push Pop Press, a software company that collaborated with Melcher Media on the iOS app Our Choice by Al Gore. The app was a best seller and a top-grossing title in the App Store and was honored with a 2011 Apple Design Award. Push Pop Press was acquired by Facebook in 2011.

=== DuraBooks ===
In 2004, Melcher Media received a patent for a waterproof book-binding technology, known as DuraBooks. Using synthetic paper, DuraBooks are durable yet also recyclable. The most prominent DuraBook titles include Michael Braungart and William McDonough's Cradle to Cradle (North Point) and Aqua Erotica: 18 Stories for a Steamy Bath (Three Rivers). Cradle to Cradle Design uses DuraBook technology as an example of an "upcyclable" product.
