= Melcher Media =

- Founded: 1993
- Founder: Charles Melcher
- Country of origin: United States
- Headquarters location: New York City
- Distribution: Two Rivers Distribution
- Publication types: Books
- Official website: melcher.com

Melcher Media is a book packager and publisher in New York City, New York, founded in 1993 by Charles Melcher. The company’s focuses include theater-, movie-, and TV-related books; environmental titles; pop-up books; and DuraBooks.

The company has put more than 15 million copies into print, including 30 New York Times best sellers, such as An Inconvenient Truth by Al Gore (Rodale), The Wisdom of Sundays by Oprah Winfrey (Flatiron), The Mamba Mentality by Kobe Bryant (MCD/FSG), and Martha Stewart's Organizing (Houghton Mifflin), as well as the official companions to Hamilton (Grand Central), Stranger Things (Del Rey), and Wicked (Hachette).

Melcher Media is known for highly visual, innovative, and physically distinctive books, such as a pink faux-alligator binding of Sex and the City: Kiss and Tell, a gold-embossed double-gatefold cover for Tutankhamun: Treasures of the Golden Pharaoh, and J.J. Abrams's S., which contained more than 22 inserted artifacts.

== Future of StoryTelling ==
Melcher Media founded and produced The Future of StoryTelling summit, an exclusive gathering of highly influential people that are shaping the way that technology is revolutionizing human communications. Organized around a series of intimate, high-level discussions with inspiring speakers, as well as immersive experiences, this participatory summit will expose top-tier individuals and corporations to the new ideas and technologies that are driving the storytelling renaissance in the digital age.

== DuraBooks ==
In 2004, Melcher Media received U.S. patent 6,773,034 for a waterproof book-binding technology, known as DuraBooks. Using synthetic paper, DuraBooks are durable yet also recyclable. The most prominent DuraBook titles include Michael Braungart and William McDonough’s Cradle to Cradle (North Point) and Aqua Erotica: 18 Stories for a Steamy Bath (Three Rivers). Cradle to Cradle Design uses DuraBook technology as an example of an "upcyclable" product.

== Awards ==
- 2008: New York Book Show, First Place, Cookbook, Deceptively Delicious
- 2008: New York Book Show, Second Place, Photography, Illumination
- 2008: New York Book Show, Second Place, General Books, The Sopranos
- 2008: New York Book Show, Third Place, Gift Book, Shakespeare’s Genealogies
- 2006: AIGA Fifty Books/Fifty Covers, Avenue Q
- 2005: AIGA Fifty Books/Fifty Covers, Wicked
- 2005: American Photo, 10 Best Photography Books of the Year, Individuals
