= The Environmental Institute =

The Environmental Institute (O Instituto Ambiental (OIA)) is a non-profit organization devoted exclusively to building and managing Integrated Biosystems that purify sewage water in urban areas and for small farms and agro-industries in South America. It was one of the first organizations created for such a purpose.

OIA applies integrated biosystems to recycle dangerously polluted wastewater into organic fertilizer, safe agricultural and aquaculture products, biofuel, habitat, and clean water. The process enhances flood control, soil renewal and CO_{2} reduction. OIA has constructed more than 70 water reclamation and community agricultural and development projects in Brazil, Nicaragua, Dominican Republic, and Spain, serving more than 15,000 persons and processing waste from various agricultural operations.

OIA projects are among the first and most comprehensive applications of the Intelligent Products System, which evolved into the Cradle to Cradle system. Early projects were instrumental in forming and implementing the systems, now used worldwide. These are some of the first practical uses of Intelligent Product and Cradle to Cradle principles in developing economies.

OIA projects resulted from successful green technology transfer from China, Germany and the U.S. to South America at a time when many sustainability technology transfers were failing. More than 25 technologies were transferred to Brazil to build the projects, with most of those technologies operating today and expanding rapidly.

== History ==
Founded in Brazil in 1993, OIA was the collaborative brainchild of anti-poverty activist Waldemar Boff, renowned chemist Prof. Michael Braungart, community entrepreneur Valmir Fachini, biological engineer Katja Hansen, and environmental manager Douglas Mulhall. OIA developed out of collaboration between the Hamburger Umweltinstitut in Germany and the Brazilian social self-help organization SEOP. It benefitted from the conceptual work of Michael Braungart, GAIA Foundation President Jose Lutzemberger, and the engineering concepts of Prof G.L.Chan of Mauritius, whose Integrated Farming System is a major component.

A precursor to OIA's projects was constructed in Silva Jardim RJ Brazil as a demonstration for the 1992 Rio Earth Summit and was featured on U.S. National Public Radio as one of the only functioning examples of a sustainable technology within driving distance of that pivotal conference.

The work of OIA is supported by various municipalities, foundations, and companies.

== Integrated Biosystem Highlights ==
Most conventional wastewater treatment plants try to clean water mechanically and chemically then release it into waterways. Such systems are expensive, produce limited economic benefits, and can themselves pollute. By contrast, integrated biosystems treat water by recycling it for agricultural use, producing numerous economic, health and environmental benefits.

Nutrients in wastewater are recycled by algae, crops and livestock via processes such as photosynthesis, mineralization, and uptake.

Water is treated by combined natural processes such as soil and root filtration, sedimentation and biochemical reactions including photosynthesis, anaerobic and aerobic digestion.

In this system, clean water is a by-product along with organic crops, fertilized soil, and reclaimed wildlife habitat. Economic benefits come from soil restoration, fertilizer recovery, crops and livestock. Products can be produced safely and profitably with low input costs.

Costs are minimized by using wastewater for fertilizer, integrating crops for pest protection, maintaining biodiversity, treating water via natural processes, and reducing environmental liability.

The technology is especially suitable for poor soil, and regions where flood control or water conservation are required.

Locally available resources are used so costs for imported fertilizer and equipment are minimized.

Components are scalable, ranging from single households to large farms and communities.

Due to high levels of year-round ambient sunlight, more productive applications occur in a belt defined by 30 degrees latitude north and south of the equator.

== See also ==
- Michael Braungart
- Douglas Mulhall
