= Föst =

Föst is a surname of German origin. Notable people with the name include:

- Daniel Föst (born 1976), a German politician
- Ingrid Föst (born 1934), a German gymnast

== See also ==
- Fost
