= Purchase discount =

Offer from seller to buyer to reduce the price if it is paid within a set time limit

In finance, a purchase discount is an offer from the supplier to the purchaser, to reduce the payment amount if the payment is made within a certain period of time. For example, a purchaser bought a $100 item, with a purchase discount term 3/10, net 30. If he pays within 10 days, he will only need to pay $97. If he pays half the amount In accounting, gross method and net method are used to record transactions of this kind. Under the gross method, the total cost of purchases are credited to accounts payable first, and discounts realized later if the payments were made in time. Under the net method, purchase discounts are realized right away. And if the payments are not made in time, an anti-revenue account name purchase discounts lost is debited to record the loss.
