= Purchasing process =

Purchasing is the formal process of buying goods and services. The purchasing process can vary from one organization to another, but there are some common key elements.

The process usually starts with a demand or requirements – this could be for a physical part (inventory) or a service. A requisition is generated, which details the requirements (in some cases providing a requirements specification) which actions the procurement department. A request for proposal (RFP) or request for quotation (RFQ) is then raised. Suppliers send their quotations in response to the RFQ, and a review is undertaken where the best offer (typically based on price, availability and quality) is given the purchase order.

Purchase orders (PO) can be of various types, including:

- standard - a one time buy
- planned - an agreement on a specific item at an approximate date
- blanket - an agreement on specific terms and conditions: date and quantity and amount are not specified.

Purchase orders are normally accompanied by terms and conditions which form the contractual agreement of the transaction. The supplier then delivers the products or service and the customer records the delivery (in some cases this goes through a goods inspection process). An invoice is sent by the supplier which is cross-checked with the purchase order and documents specifying which goods have been received. The payment is then made and transferred to the supplier.

== Types of purchases ==
Depending on what type of purchase you are going to make, then the process concerned is not the same. The following examples show the different processes that take place concerning the different purchase types.

=== Personal purchases ===
The consumer purchases for the consumption of themselves, then they fall into this very important category class. They are ultimately driving the economy through the purchase of its products. Therefore, the economy becomes dependent on them.

=== Mercantile purchasing ===
Facilitated by middlemen for the intention of re-sale to meet others requirements. Agents, wholesalers and retailers come under this category providing their own channels of distribution to the consumer.

=== Industrial purchasing ===
The is buying to convert material into finished goods and product. It entails buying raw materials. Components, supplies and consumable stores, spares and tools, machines and equipment and office appliances.

=== Institutionalized or government purchasing ===
Government agencies or institutions are very important, critical, they purchase in bulk for public utilities.
