= Cradle-to-cradle design =

Biomimetic approach to the design of products

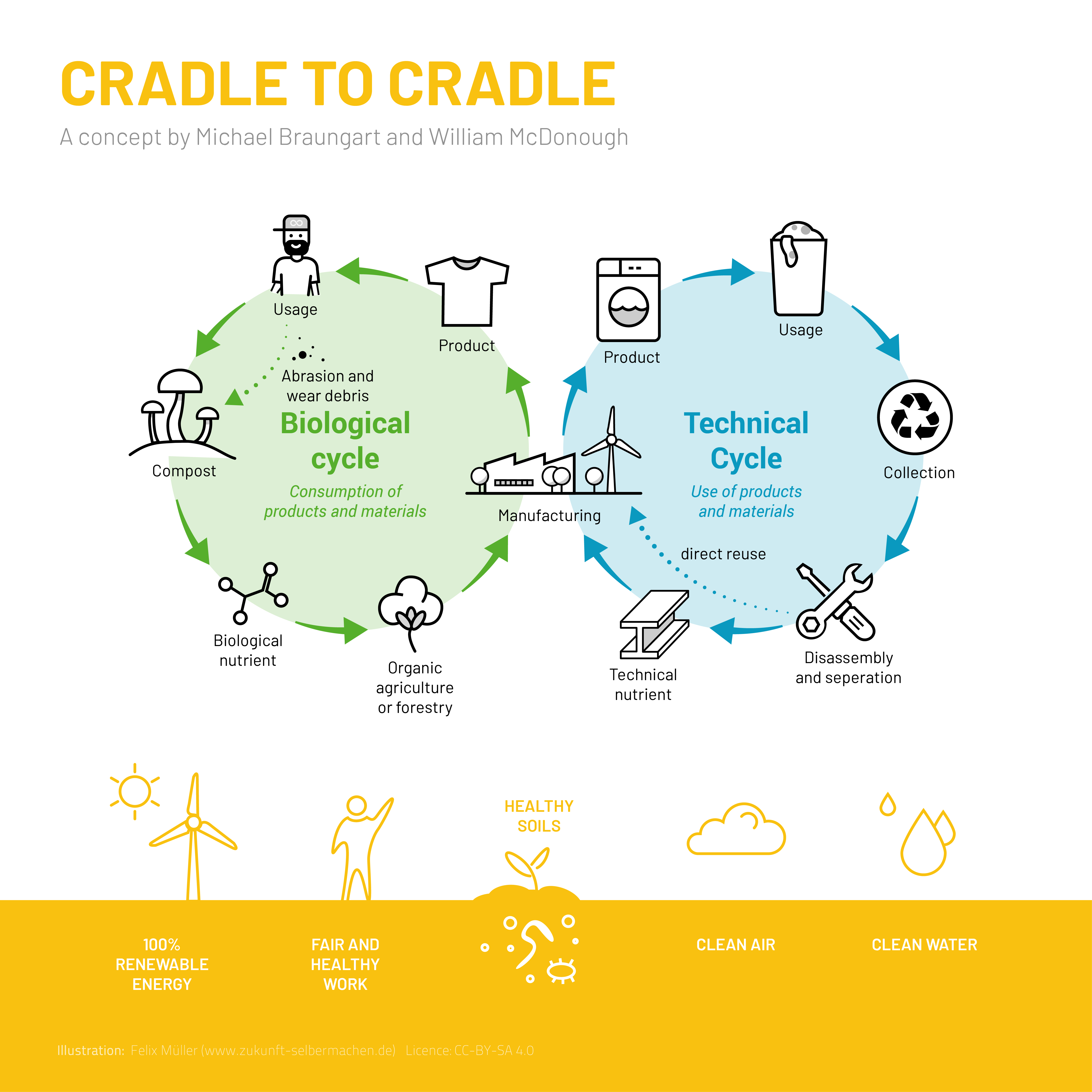
Cradle to Cradle concept by M. Braungart and W. McDonough

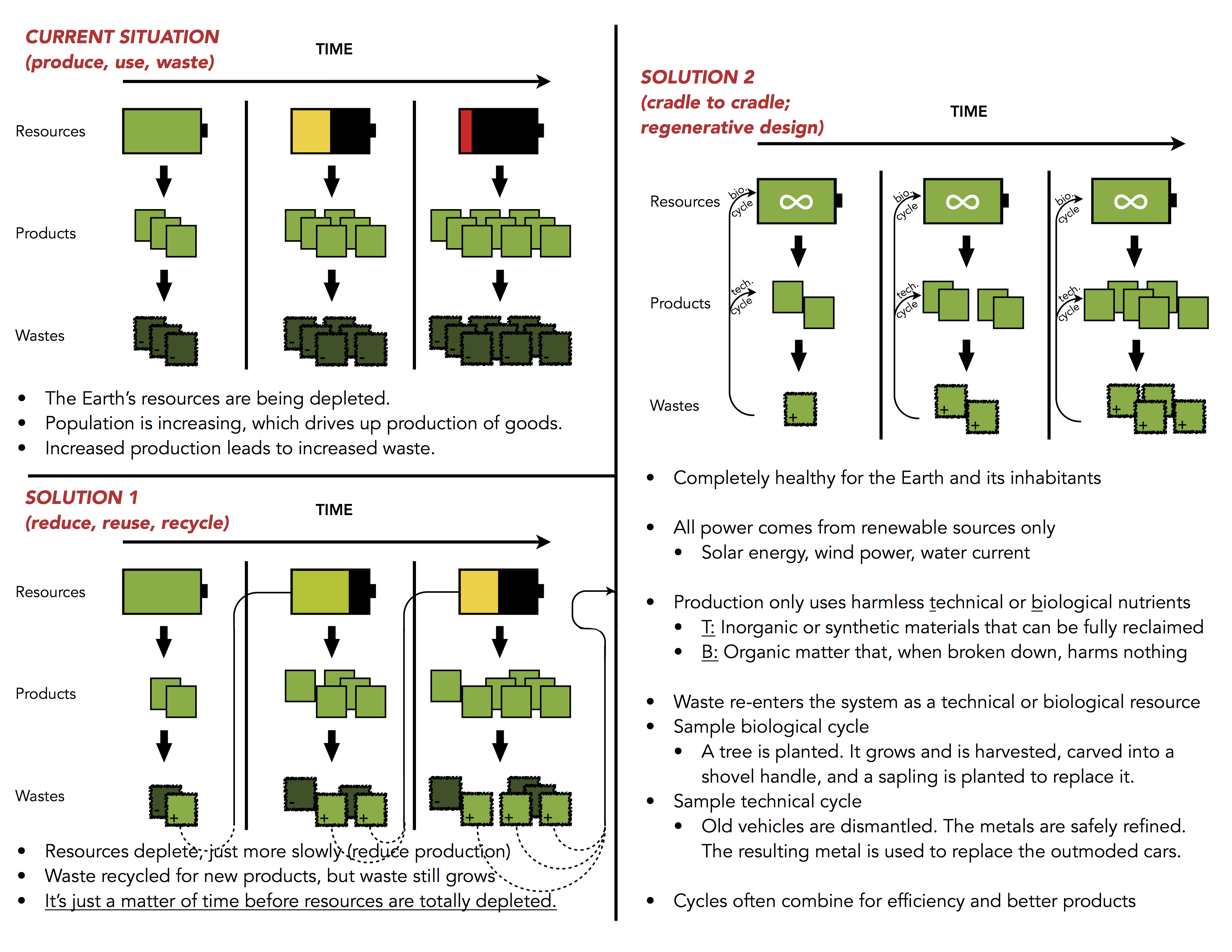
The current economic system, the current solution (the 3Rs), and the C2C framework as an alternative solution

Cradle-to-cradle design (also referred to as 2CC2, C2C, cradle 2 cradle, or regenerative design) is a biomimetic approach to the design of products and systems that models human industry on nature's processes, where materials are viewed as nutrients circulating in healthy, safe metabolisms. The term itself is a play on the popular corporate phrase "cradle to grave", implying that the C2C model is sustainable and considerate of life and future generations—from the birth, or "cradle", of one generation to the next generation, versus from birth to death, or "grave", within the same generation.

C2C suggests that industry must protect and enrich ecosystems and nature's biological metabolism while also maintaining a safe, productive technical metabolism for the high-quality use and circulation of organic and technical nutrients. It is a holistic, economic, industrial and social framework that seeks to create systems that are not only efficient but also essentially waste free. Building off the whole systems approach of John T. Lyle's regenerative design, the model in its broadest sense is not limited to industrial design and manufacturing; it can be applied to many aspects of human civilization such as urban environments, buildings, economics and social systems.

The term "Cradle to Cradle" is a registered trademark of McDonough Braungart Design Chemistry (MBDC) consultants. The Cradle to Cradle Certified Products Program began as a proprietary system; however, in 2012 MBDC turned the certification over to an independent non-profit called the Cradle to Cradle Products Innovation Institute. Independence, openness, and transparency are the Institute's first objectives for the certification protocols. The phrase "cradle to cradle" itself was coined by Walter R. Stahel in the 1970s. The current model is based on a system of "lifecycle development" initiated by Michael Braungart and colleagues at the Environmental Protection Encouragement Agency (EPEA) in the 1990s and explored through the publication A Technical Framework for Life-Cycle Assessment.

In 2002, Braungart and William McDonough published a book called Cradle to Cradle: Remaking the Way We Make Things, a manifesto for cradle-to-cradle design that gives specific details of how to achieve the model. The model has been implemented by many companies, organizations and governments around the world. Cradle-to-cradle design has also been the subject of many documentary films such as Waste = Food.

== Introduction ==
In the cradle-to-cradle model, all materials used in industrial or commercial processes—such as metals, fibers, dyes—fall into one of two categories: "technical" or "biological" nutrients.

1. Technical nutrients are strictly limited to non-toxic, non-harmful synthetic materials that have no negative effects on the natural environment; they can be used in continuous cycles as the same product without losing their integrity or quality. In this manner these materials can be used over and over again instead of being "downcycled" into lesser products, ultimately becoming waste.
2. Biological nutrients are organic materials that, once used, can be disposed of in any natural environment and decompose into the soil, providing food for small life forms without affecting the natural environment. This is dependent on the ecology of the region; for example, organic material from one country or landmass may be harmful to the ecology of another country or landmass.

The two types of materials each follow their own cycle in the regenerative economy envisioned by Keunen and Huizing.

=== Structure ===
Initially defined by McDonough and Braungart, the Cradle to Cradle Products Innovation Institute's five certification criteria are:

- Material health, which involves identifying the chemical composition of the materials that make up the product. Particularly hazardous materials (e.g. heavy metals, pigments, halogen compounds etc.) have to be reported whatever the concentration, and other materials reported where they exceed 100 ppm. For wood, the forest source is required. The risk for each material is assessed against criteria and eventually ranked on a scale with green being materials of low risk, yellow being those with moderate risk but are acceptable to continue to use, red for materials that have high risk and need to be phased out, and grey for materials with incomplete data. The method uses the term 'risk' in the sense of hazard (as opposed to consequence and likelihood).
- Material reutilization, which is about recovery and recycling at the end of product life.
- Assessment of energy required for production, which for the highest level of certification needs to be based on at least 40% renewable energy for all parts and subassemblies.
- Water, particularly usage and discharge quality.
- Social responsibility, which assesses fair labor practices.

=== Health ===
Currently, many human beings come into contact or consume, directly or indirectly, many harmful materials and chemicals daily. In addition, countless other forms of plant and animal life are also exposed. C2C seeks to remove dangerous technical nutrients (synthetic materials such as mutagenic materials, heavy metals and other dangerous chemicals) from current life cycles. If the materials we come into contact with and are exposed to on a daily basis are not toxic and do not have long term health effects, then the health of the overall system can be better maintained. For example, a fabric factory can eliminate all harmful technical nutrients by carefully reconsidering what chemicals they use in their dyes to achieve the colours they need and attempt to do so with fewer base chemicals.

=== Economics ===
The C2C model shows high potential for reducing the financial cost of industrial systems. For example, in the redesign of the Ford River Rouge Complex, the planting of Sedum (stonecrop) vegetation on assembly plant roofs retains and cleanses rain water. It also moderates the internal temperature of the building in order to save energy. The roof is part of an $18 million rainwater treatment system designed to clean 20 billion US gallons (76,000,000 m^{3}) of rainwater annually. This saved Ford $30 million that would otherwise have been spent on mechanical treatment facilities. Following C2C design principles, product manufacture can be designed to cost less for the producer and consumer. Theoretically, they can eliminate the need for waste disposal such as landfills.

=== Definitions ===
- Cradle to cradle is a play on the phrase "cradle to grave", implying that the C2C model is sustainable and considerate of life and future generations.
- Technical nutrients are basically inorganic or synthetic materials manufactured by humans—such as plastics and metals—that can be used many times over without any loss in quality, staying in a continuous cycle.
- Biological nutrients and materials are organic materials that can decompose into the natural environment, soil, water, etc. without affecting it in a negative way, providing food for bacteria and microbiological life.
- Materials are usually referred to as the building blocks of other materials, such as the dyes used in colouring fibers or rubbers used in the sole of a shoe.
- Downcycling is the reuse of materials into lesser products. For example, a plastic computer case could be downcycled into a plastic cup, which then becomes a park bench, etc.; this eventually leads to plastic waste. In conventional understanding, this is no different from recycling that produces a supply of the same product or material.
- Waste = Food is a basic concept of organic waste materials becoming food for bugs, insects and other small forms of life who can feed on it, decompose it and return it to the natural environment which we then indirectly use for food ourselves.

=== Existing synthetic materials ===
The question of how to deal with the countless existing technical nutrients (synthetic materials) that cannot be recycled or reintroduced to the natural environment is dealt with in C2C design. The materials that can be reused and retain their quality can be used within the technical nutrient cycles while other materials are far more difficult to deal with, such as plastics in the Pacific Ocean.

== Hypothetical examples ==
One potential example is a shoe that is designed and mass-produced using the C2C model. The sole might be made of "biological nutrients" while the upper parts might be made of "technical nutrients". The shoe is mass-produced at a manufacturing plant that utilizes its waste material by putting it back into the cycle, potentially by using off-cuts from the rubber soles to make more soles instead of merely disposing of them; this is dependent on the technical materials not losing their quality as they are reused. Once the shoes have been manufactured, they are distributed to retail outlets where the customer buys the shoe at a reduced price because the customer is only paying for the use of the materials in the shoe for the period of time that they will be wearing them. When they outgrow the shoe or it is damaged, they return it to the manufacturer. When the manufacturer separates the sole from the upper parts (separating the technical and biological nutrients), the biological nutrients are returned to the natural environment while the technical nutrients can be used to create the sole of another shoe.

Another example of C2C design is a disposable cup, bottle, or wrapper made entirely out of biological materials. When the user is finished with the item, it can be disposed of and returned to the natural environment; the cost of disposal of waste such as landfill and recycling is greatly reduced. The user could also potentially return the item for a refund so it can be used again.

== Finished products ==
- Rohner Textile AG Climatex-textile
- Biofoam, a cradle-to-cradle alternative to expanded polystyrene
- Sewage sludge treatment plants are facilities that may create fertiliser from sewage sludge. This approach is green retrofit for the current (inefficient) system of organic waste disposal; as composting toilets are a better approach in the long run.
- Aquion Energy large scale batteries
- Ecovative Design packaging and insulation made from waste by binding it together with mycelium

== Implementation ==
The C2C model can be applied to almost any system in modern society: urban environments, buildings, manufacturing, social systems, etc. Five steps are outlined in Cradle to Cradle: Remaking the Way We Make Things:

1. Get "free of" known culprits
2. Follow informed personal preferences
3. Create "passive positive" lists—lists of materials used categorised according to their safety level
  1. The X list—substances that must be phased out, such as teratogenic, mutagenic, carcinogenic
  2. The gray list—problematic substances that are not so urgently in need of phasing out
  3. The P list—the "positive" list, substances actively defined as safe for use
4. Activate the positive list
5. Reinvent—the redesign of the former system

Products that adhere to all steps may be eligible to receive C2C certification. Other certifications such as Leadership in Energy and Environmental Design (LEED) and Building Research Establishment Environmental Assessment Method (BREEAM) can be used to qualify for certification, and vice versa in the case of BREEAM.

C2C principles were first applied to systems in the early 1990s by Braungart's Hamburger Umweltinstitut (HUI) and The Environmental Institute in Brazil for biomass nutrient recycling of effluent to produce agricultural products and clean water as a byproduct.

In 2007, MBDC and the EPEA formed a strategic partnership with global materials consultancy Material ConneXion to help promote and disseminate C2C design principles by providing greater global access to C2C material information, certification and product development.

As of January 2008, Material ConneXion's Materials Libraries in New York, Milan, Cologne, Bangkok and Daegu, Korea, started to feature C2C assessed and certified materials and, in collaboration with MBDC and EPEA, the company now offers C2C Certification, and C2C product development.

While the C2C model has influenced the construction or redevelopment of smaller sites, several large organizations and governments have also implemented the C2C model and its ideas and concepts:

=== Major implementations ===
- The Lyle Center for Regenerative Studies incorporates holistic & cyclic systems throughout the center. Regenerative design is arguably the foundation for the trademarked C2C.
- The Government of China contributed to the construction of the city of Huangbaiyu based on C2C principles, utilising the rooftops for agriculture. This project is largely criticized as a failure to meet the desires & constraints of the local people.
- The Ford River Rouge Complex redevelopment, cleaning 20 billion US gallons (76,000,000 m^{3}) of rainwater annually.
- The Netherlands Institute of Ecology (NIOO-KNAW) planned to make its laboratory and office complex completely cradle-to-cradle compliant.
- Several private houses and communal buildings in the Netherlands.
- Fashion Positive, an initiative to assist the fashion world in implementing the cradle-to-cradle model in five areas: material health, material reuse, renewable energy, water stewardship and social fairness.

== Coordination with other models ==
The cradle-to-cradle model can be viewed as a framework that considers systems as a whole or holistically. It can be applied to many aspects of human society, and is related to life-cycle assessment. See for instance the LCA-based model of the eco-costs, which has been designed to cope with analyses of recycle systems. The cradle-to-cradle model in some implementations is closely linked with the car-free movement, such as in the case of large-scale building projects or the construction or redevelopment of urban environments. It is closely linked with passive solar design in the building industry and with permaculture in agriculture within or near urban environments. An earthship is a perfect example where different re-use models are used, including cradle-to-cradle design and permaculture.

== Constraints ==
A major constraint in the optimal recycling of materials is that at civic amenity sites, products are not disassembled by hand and have each individual part sorted into a bin, but instead have the entire product sorted into a certain bin.

This makes the extraction of rare-earth elements and other materials uneconomical (at recycling sites, products typically get crushed after which the materials are extracted by means of magnets, chemicals, special sorting methods, ...) and thus optimal recycling of, for example metals is impossible (an optimal recycling method for metals would require to sort all similar alloys together rather than mixing plain iron with alloys).

Obviously, disassembling products is not feasible at currently designed civic amenity sites, and a better method would be to send back the broken products to the manufacturer, so that the manufacturer can disassemble the product. These disassembled product can then be used for making new products or at least to have the components sent separately to recycling sites (for proper recycling, by the exact type of material). At present though, few laws are put in place in any country to oblige manufacturers to take back their products for disassembly, nor are there even such obligations for manufacturers of cradle-to-cradle products. One process where this is happening is in the EU with the Waste Electrical and Electronic Equipment Directive. Also, the European Training Network for the Design and Recycling of Rare-Earth Permanent Magnet Motors and Generators in Hybrid and Full Electric Vehicles (ETN-Demeter) makes designs of electric motors of which the magnets can be easily removed for recycling the rare earth metals.

== Criticism and response ==
Criticism has been advanced on the fact that McDonough and Braungart previously kept C2C consultancy and certification in their inner circle. Critics argued that this lack of competition prevented the model from fulfilling its potential. Many critics pleaded for a public-private partnership overseeing the C2C concept, thus enabling competition and growth of practical applications and services.

McDonough and Braungart responded to this criticism by giving control of the certification protocol to a non-profit, independent Institute called the Cradle to Cradle Products Innovation Institute. McDonough said the new institute "will enable our protocol to become a public certification program and global standard". The new Institute announced the creation of a Certification Standards Board in June 2012. The new board, under the auspices of the Institute, will oversee the certification moving forward.

Experts in the field of environment protection have questioned the practicability of the concept. Friedrich Schmidt-Bleek, head of the German Wuppertal Institute, called his assertion that the "old" environmental movement had hindered innovation with its pessimist approach "pseudo-psychological humbug". Schmidt-Bleek said of the Cradle-to-Cradle seat cushions Braungart developed for the Airbus 380: "I can feel very nice on Michael's seat covers in the airplane. Nevertheless I am still waiting for a detailed proposal for a design of the other 99.99 percent of the Airbus 380 after his principles."

In 2009 Schmidt-Bleek stated that it is out of the question that the concept can be realized on a bigger scale.

Some claim that C2C certification may not be entirely sufficient in all eco-design approaches. Quantitative methodologies (LCAs) and more adapted tools (regarding the product type which is considered) could be used in tandem. The C2C concept ignores the use phase of a product. According to variants of life-cycle assessment (see: Life-cycle assessment § Variants) the entire life cycle of a product or service has to be evaluated, not only the material itself. For many goods e.g. in transport, the use phase has the most influence on the environmental footprint. For example, the more lightweight a car or a plane the less fuel it consumes and consequently the less impact it has. Braungart fully ignores the use phase.

It is safe to say that every production step or resource-transformation step needs a certain amount of energy.

The C2C concept foresees its own certification of its analysis and therefore is in contradiction to international publishing standards (ISO 14040 and ISO 14044) for life-cycle assessment whereas an independent external review is needed in order to obtain comparative and resilient results.

== See also ==
- Appropriate technology
- Ellen MacArthur Foundation
- List of environment topics
- Modular construction systems
- Planned obsolescence – the opposite of durable, no waste design
- The Blue Economy
- Upcycling
