= Cradle to Cradle: Remaking the Way We Make Things =

Book

- Cover of Cradle to Cradle
- Author: William McDonough; Michael Braungart
- Language: English
- Genre: Recycling; industrial management; environmentalism
- Publisher: North Point Press
- Publication date: 2002
- Publication place: United States
- Media type: Print (DuraBook)
- Pages: 193
- ISBN: 0-86547-587-3
- Dewey Decimal: 745.2 (Alameda County Library)

Cradle to Cradle: Remaking the Way We Make Things is a 2002 non-fiction book by German chemist Michael Braungart and US architect William McDonough. It is a manifesto detailing how to achieve their Cradle to Cradle Design model. It calls for a radical change in industry: a switch from a cradle-to-grave pattern to a cradle-to-cradle pattern. It suggests that the "reduce reuse recycle" methods perpetuate this cradle-to-grave strategy, and that more changes need to be made. The book discourages downcycling, but rather encourages the manufacture of products with the goal of upcycling in mind. This vision of upcycling is based on a system of "lifecycle development" initiated by Braungart and colleagues at the Environmental Protection Encouragement Agency in the 1990s: after products have reached the end of their useful life, they become either "biological nutrients" or "technical nutrients". Biological nutrients are materials that can re-enter the environment. Technical nutrients are materials that remain within closed-loop industrial cycles.

The book uses historical examples such as the Industrial Revolution along with commentary on science, nature, and society.

== Background ==
William McDonough and Michael Braungart met at an Environmental Protection Encouragement Agency reception in New York City. They began discussing toxicity and design. They were immediately interested in working together to create a better world for each other, and in 1991 they coauthored The Hannover Principles: a set of design guidelines for the 2000 World's Fair that were issued at the 1992 World Urban Forum and United Nations forum of the Earth Summit. In 1995 they founded McDonough Braungart Design Chemistry, a firm to assist companies in implementing sustainable design protocols.

== Publication ==
The book was published in 2002 by North Point Press. The book itself is printed using DuraBook technology. The pages are not paper, but rather synthetics created from plastic resins and inorganic fillers. The books are more durable and strong than traditional paper books, waterproof, and upcyclable. It is considered a "technical nutrient" in the lifecycle development system.

The book has been translated into 12 languages.

== See also ==
- Life cycle assessment
- Sustainable products
