= Huangbaiyu =

Village in Liaoning province, China

Coordinates: 41°06′N 124°21′E

Huangbaiyu (simplified Chinese: 黄柏峪村; traditional Chinese: 黃柏峪村; pinyin: Huángbǎiyù Cūn) is a model sustainable village in Benxi, Liaoning, China. As of 2006, over 40 individual houses had been built; however, the construction methods, costs, materials used and the house designs have come under great criticism.

== Planning ==
Huangbaiyu was conceived by William McDonough and Partners in conjunction with Tongji University in Shanghai, the Benxi Design Institute, and China-U.S. Center for Sustainable Development. The town is being built in stages and is to be model of sustainable development using principles laid out by McDonough. His main thesis is that instead of trying to reduce waste you eliminate it by having everything be capable of being broken down into technical or biological nutrition that can be reused so that no waste is created and no waste needs to be disposed.

== Construction ==
In April 2006, the project was encountering some difficulties: some housing was completed, but no residents had moved in. By September 2006, 42 houses had been built. The cost of each individual dwelling is estimated to be around 28,000 yuan (A$4,600).

== Controversies ==
- Of the 42 completed houses, only three have used the hay and pressed-earth combination. The rest use hay and compressed bricks of coal-dust, triggering a debate over whether the coal dust represents a health risk.
- Only one house has solar panels; the rest were built to burn timber but have now been modified to use gas from a biogassification plant that Huangbaiyu's village chief, Dai Xiaolong, built after buying the technology. None of the houses face south as originally planned because the building contractor changed the orientation to fit Feng Shui. Inexplicably, the new houses also have garages, although no villager can afford a car.
- American anthropologist Shannon May was sponsored by computer-chip giant Intel to live in the village to monitor the transformation. But after more than a year, she is dismayed at the outcome and worried that to "save face", the village may continue to be promoted as sustainable and replicated elsewhere.
