= Future of StoryTelling =

Founded in 2012 by Charles Melcher, Founder and CEO of Melcher Media, Future of StoryTelling (FoST) produces content throughout the year, including the two-day, invitation-only FoST Summit; storytelling workshops; curated exhibitions with local and international organizations; a monthly newsletter, FoST in Thought; and the bi-weekly FoST Podcast. FoST also teaches, consults, and helps with storytelling for companies such as NBCUniversal, Microsoft, Ford, and others.

== FoST Summit ==
Launched in 2012 as a one-day, invitation-only summit for 300 people, the FoST Summit went on to expand to a week-long summit and festival for nearly 6,000 people. The event encourages attendee participation via small roundtable discussions led by experts from the worlds of business, technology, marketing, academics, and other fields; hands-on creative workshops; immersive performances; and exhibitions of storytelling projects and technologies. Past FoST Summit speakers, workshop leaders, and performers have included former Vice President Al Gore; Hamilton creator Lin-Manuel Miranda; Disney animator and director Glen Keane; Angela Ahrendts, former SVP of Retail at Apple; author Margaret Atwood; filmmaker Darren Aronofsky; choreographer Bill T. Jones; Vimeo CEO Anjali Sud; and Todd Yellin, VP of Product at Netflix.

The FoST summit takes place at Snug Harbor Cultural Center on Staten Island, an architecturally and historically significant site that was built in the mid-1800s as a home for retired sailors. Attendees meet in lower Manhattan and are transported by private ferry across New York Harbor to the 83-acre waterfront campus.

== FoST Podcast ==
Launched in 2020 and hosted by FoST founder and CEO Charles Melcher, the bi-weekly FoST Podcast features conversations with storytellers from diverse backgrounds. Past guests have included former Vice President Al Gore, author Margaret Atwood, actor Neil Patrick Harris, musician Jacob Collier, political commentator and activist Van Jones, writer and producer Wendy Calhoun, actor Rainn Wilson, and Oskar Eustis, Artistic Director of the Public Theater.

== FoST in Thought Newsletter ==
FoST produces a monthly digital newsletter, FoST in Thought, which features articles on trends and breakthroughs in the storytelling world, as well as news from FoST and its community members and a calendar of immersive storytelling events taking place around the world.

== FoST Films ==
Since its founding, FoST has produced an ongoing series of short films featuring its Summit speakers and other leaders from the storytelling world speaking about their areas of interest, such as interactive theater, immersive journalism, artificial intelligence, and the neuroscience of empathy. Past subjects have included Disney animator Glen Keane, former GE Vice Chair Beth Comstock, architect Bjarke Ingels, filmmaker Chris Milk, Niantic CEO John Hanke, journalism pioneer Nonny de la Peña, and Scott Trowbridge, Portfolio Creative Executive for Disney Imagineering.

== Theodore Roosevelt Presidential Library ==
In 2019, FoST was engaged as the official Executive Storytellers for the Theodore Roosevelt Presidential Library in Medora, North Dakota, which is currently scheduled to open to the public in 2025. In this role, FoST runs all aspects of the institution's storytelling. In addition to managing the exhibits inside of the building, FoST also oversees all of the programming and activities emanating from the Library. FoST has also produced several pieces of print collateral for the Library, including a "Request for Qualifications," which was sent to select firms who were being considered for the Library's international architecture competition. Subsequently, FoST produced a digital “Request for Proposal” for the same competition as well as an extensive "Story Guide"—a reference book, onboarding tool, and style guide for current and future Library collaborators.
