= Michael Braungart =

German chemist (born 1958)

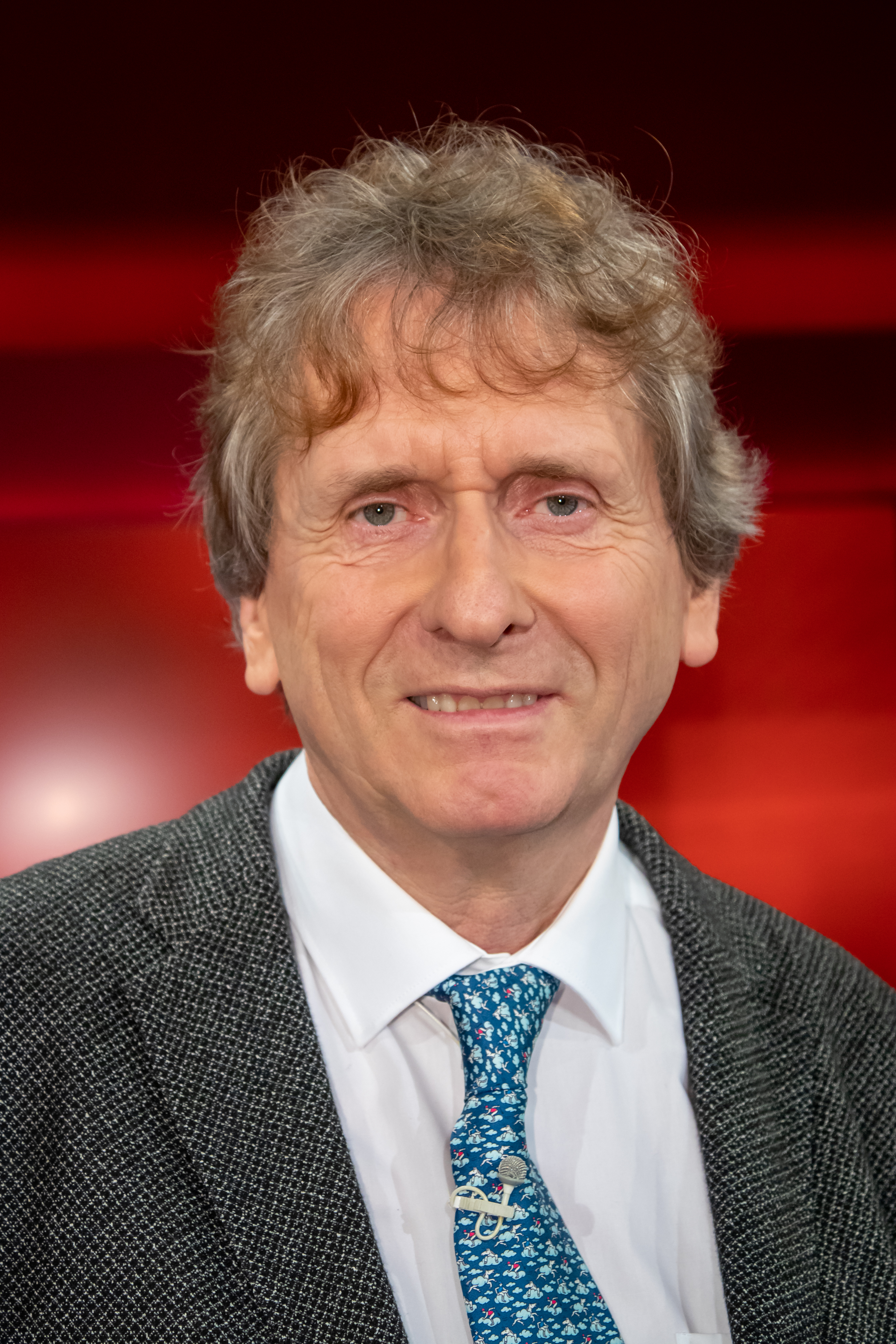
- Born: 1958 (age 67–68); Schwäbisch Gmünd, West Germany
- Citizenship: German
- Education: Darmstadt
- Scientific career
- Fields: Chemical processes of industrial production techniques

Notes
- Co-founder of the Chemistry Section of Greenpeace International

Michael Braungart (born 1958) is a German chemist who advocates that humans can make a positive instead of a negative environmental impact by redesigning industrial production and therefore that dissipation is not waste. A former Greenpeace activist who once lived in a tree as protest, he is now considered to be a visionary environmental thinker.

Founder of EPEA International Umweltforschung GmbH in Hamburg, Germany, and co-founder of MBDC McDonough Braungart Design Chemistry in Charlottesville, Virginia, Dr. Braungart is currently a professor for Eco-Design at Leuphana University of Lüneburg.

He currently holds the Cradle-to-Cradle chair at the Erasmus University Rotterdam, the Netherlands.

== Career ==
After completing studies in Process Engineering in Darmstadt, Germany, Braungart went on to investigate the chemical processes of industrial production techniques with the Chemistry Department at Konstanz, Germany. He subsequently led the formation of the Chemistry Section of Greenpeace International. By the time he completed his PhD in chemistry at the University of Hannover in 1985, he had assumed leadership of Greenpeace Chemistry.

In 1987, Braungart founded the EPEA Umweltforschung in Hamburg. At the heart of EPEA is Cradle to Cradle Design, to create products oriented toward a life-cycle economy.

In addition to his achievements with EPEA, Braungart also serves as Scientific Manager of the Hamburg Environmental Institute, the non-profit research center which produces the "Top 50 Study". This study ranks the quality of environmentally sound production of companies within the chemical industry. He has initiated scholarly and scientific inquiry into the adverse environmental and physiological impacts of industrially produced consumer goods.

Braungart also works together with American architect and designer William A. McDonough in their product design and development firm, McDonough Braungart Design Chemistry. In partnership with McDonough, Braungart released the book Cradle to Cradle: Remaking the Way We Make Things in 2002.

== Books ==
- McDonough, William; Michael Braungart. Hannover Principles of Design: Design for Sustainability (PDF). ISBN 1-55963-635-1. Archived from the original (PDF) on 2009-02-03.. Served as development guidelines for the World's Fair in Hannover, 2000.
- McDonough, William; Michael Braungart (2002). North Point Press (ed.). Cradle to Cradle: Remaking the Way We Make Things. North Point Pr. ISBN 978-0-86547-587-8.
- The Upcycle, with William McDonough, North Point Press, 2013, ISBN 9780865477483

== See also ==
- William McDonough
- The Environmental Institute
