= William McDonough =

American architect (born 1951)

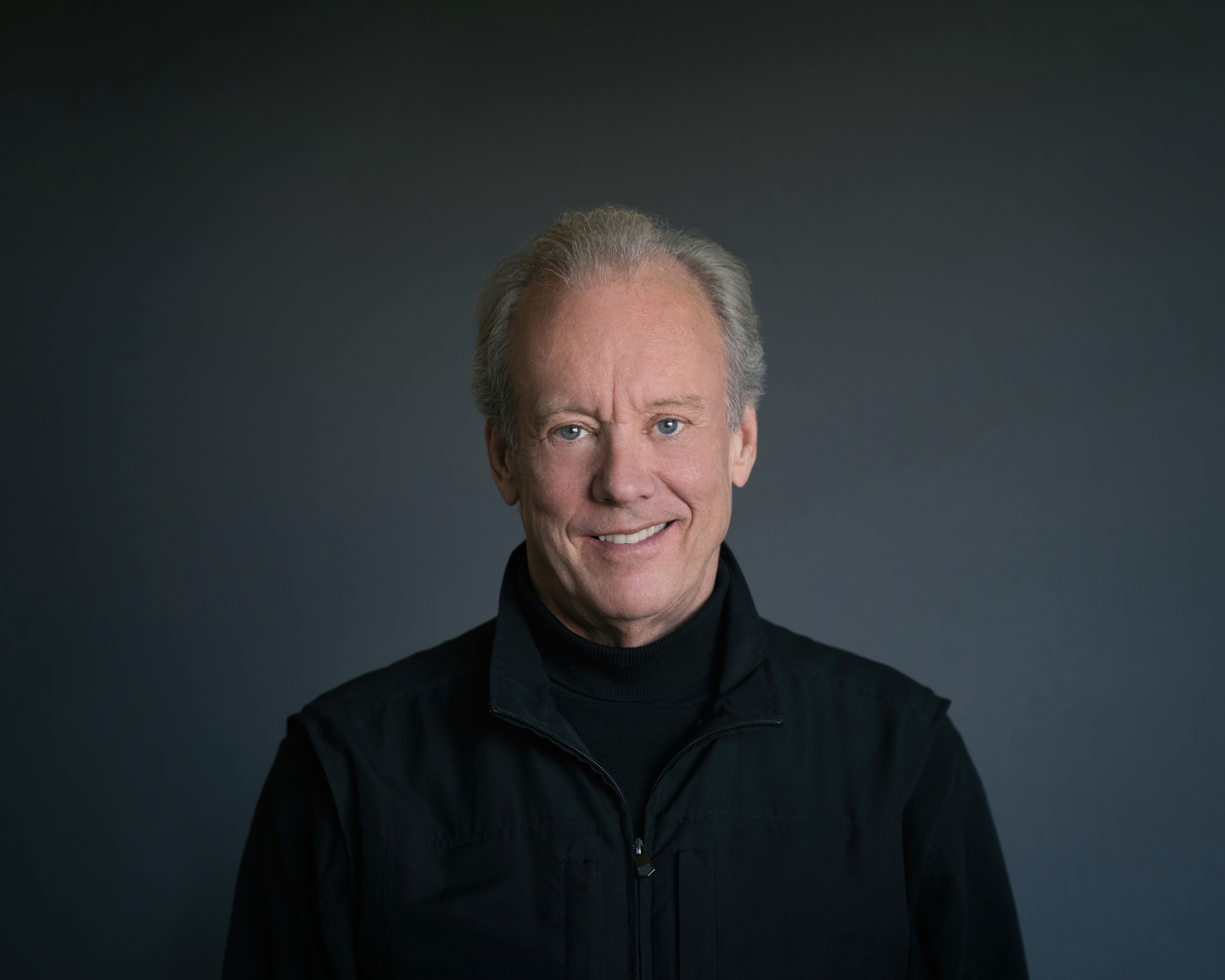
- McDonough in 2017
- Born: February 20, 1951 (age 75); Tokyo, Japan
- Education: Dartmouth College (BA); Yale University
- Occupation: Architect
- Awards: Presidential Award for Sustainable Development, National Design Award, Presidential Green Chemistry Challenge Award
- Practice: McDonough Innovation, William McDonough + Partners, McDonough Braungart Design Chemistry
- Buildings: NASA Sustainability Base, 901 Cherry (for Gap Inc., now home to YouTube), Adam Joseph Lewis Center at Oberlin College, Ford Motor Company's River Rouge Plant
- Website: mcdonough.com#home

William Andrews McDonough (born February 20, 1951) is an American architect and academic. McDonough is the founding principal of William McDonough + Partners and was the dean of the School of Architecture at the University of Virginia. He works in green and sustainable architecture, often incorporating his theory of cradle-to-cradle design.

== Early life ==
McDonough was born in Tokyo and spent most of his childhood in Hong Kong where his father was a foreign service officer. Later, his father was a Seagram executive and his family lived in Canada and Westport, Connecticut. He says the move caused "profound culture shock".

McDonough attended Dartmouth College. After graduating, he worked on the Jordan River valley redevelopment project and lived in a Bedouin tent. He studied architecture at Yale University in the mid-1970s. To fund his college education, he worked as a chauffeur for Benny Goodman.

== Career ==
McDonough founded an architectural practice in New York City in 1981. He moved his practice, William McDonough + Partners, to Charlottesville, Virginia in 1994 when he accepted the position of the dean of the School of Architecture at the University of Virginia. He served as dean until 1999 and has since been a professor of business administration and an alumni research professor.

McDonough centers his work on cradle-to-cradle design, a philosophy defined in his firm's 2002 book, Cradle to Cradle: Remaking the Way We Make Things. The goal of cradle-to-cradle design is to shift thinking from doing "less bad" to being "more good".

In 2002, he was the subject in The Next Industrial Revolution, a documentary directed by Christopher Bedford and Shelley Morhaim.

McDonough's architecture firm's designs are mostly categorized as green architecture or sustainable architecture, often using solar and passive energy efficiency techniques. This type of architecture is not known for its distinctive visual style but instead for minimizing the negative environmental impact of a building. McDonough says he aspires to design something like a tree, something that creates good, like oxygen, rather than minimizing negative impact.

McDonough co-founded the Make It Right Foundation with Brad Pitt to rebuild the Lower Ninth Ward in New Orleans in 2007. In 2008, McDonough was a senior advisor and Venture Partner at VantagePoint Capital Partners, one of the largest venture capital investors in clean technology.

On May 20, 2010, at Google's Googleplex, McDonough announced the launch of the Green Products Innovation Institute, a non-profit public/private collaboration which was later renamed the Cradle to Cradle Products Innovation Institute. Executives from Google, Walmart, YouTube, Shaw Inc., and Herman Miller Inc. joined McDonough for the announcement. Located in Charlottesville, Virginia, the institute builds on the 2008 California state law establishing the nation's first green chemistry program.

At the January 2014 World Economic Forum (WEF) annual meeting in Davos, Switzerland, McDonough led a workshop for CEOs that was centered around sustainable design, with an added focus on cradle-to-cradle, the upcycle, and the circular economy. Before the meeting, he participated in the organizing process in Geneva, when the WEF partnered with the United Nations to review climate change. McDonough was appointed chair of the forum's Meta-Council on Circular Economy in July 2014. He addressed the Arctic Circle China Forum in Shanghai in May 2019.

He is a senior fellow of the Design Futures Council. He is also the chief executive of McDonough Innovation, which provides consulting to global companies, organizations, and governments.

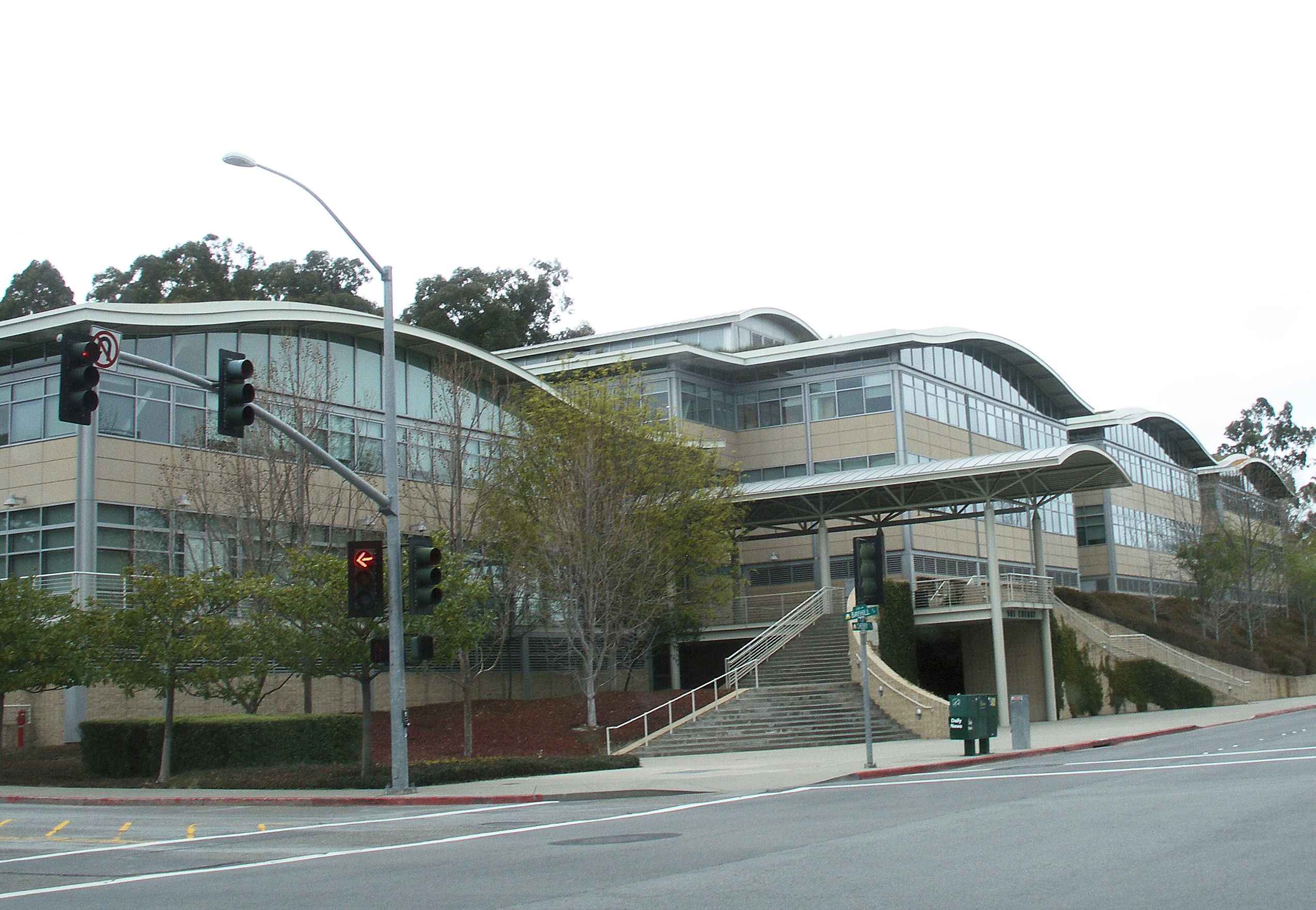
YouTube Headquarters, 901 Cherry Avenue, San Bruno, California

== Projects ==
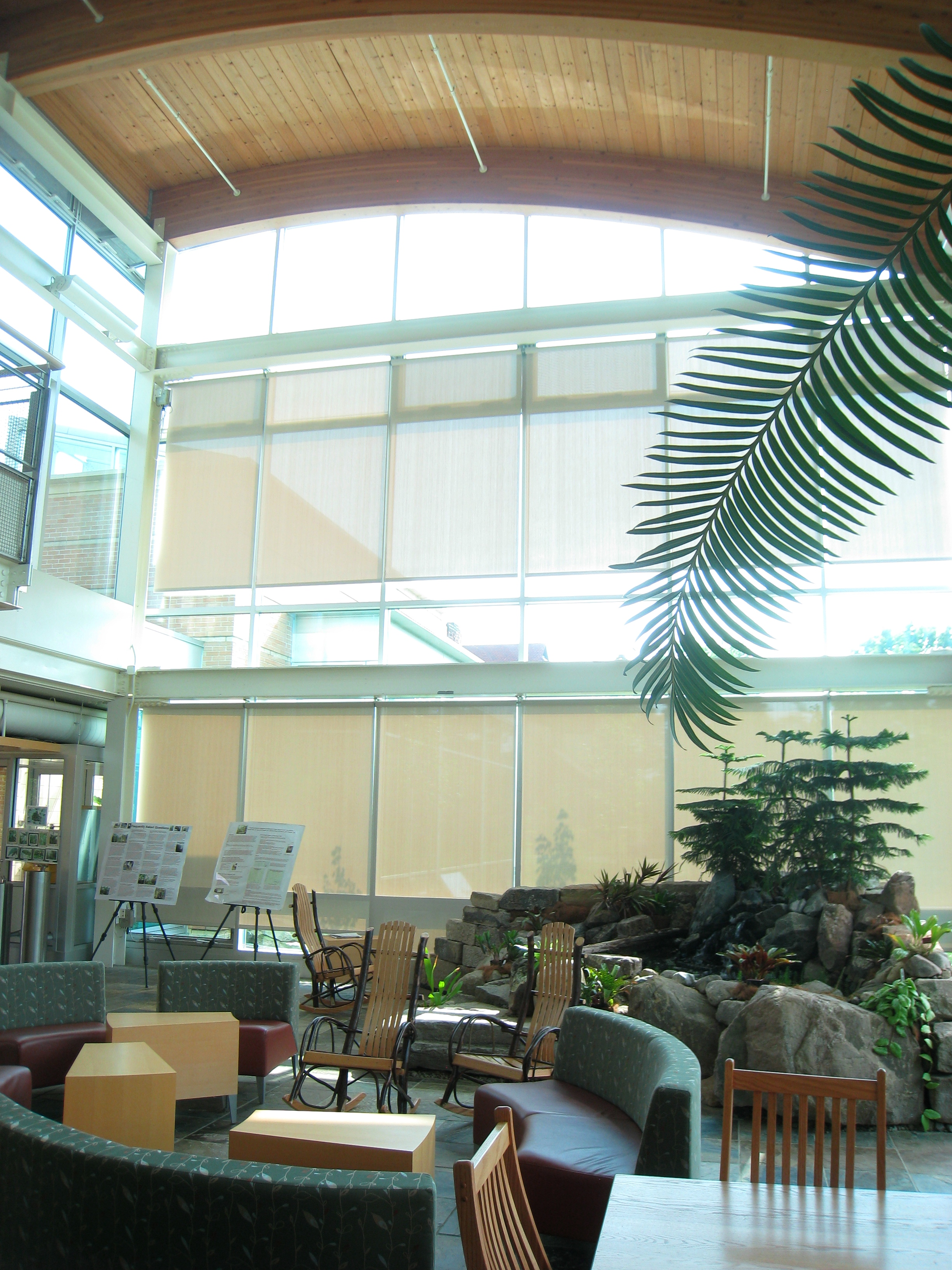
Lewis Center, Oberlin College

McDonough's first major commission was the Environmental Defense Fund (EDF) Headquarters in New York City in 1984. The EDF's requirement for good indoor air quality exposed McDonough to the importance of sustainable development. Since then, William McDonough + Partners has been responsible for numerous milestones in the sustainable movement, such as 901 Cherry Avenue in San Bruno, California, completed in 1997 for Gap, Inc.; it is now the headquarters for YouTube. The building features a 70,000-square-foot (6,500 m^{2}) green roof that helps to prevent water runoff, insulates the building from noise, and provides a habitat for several species. It received the BusinessWeek/Architectural Record Design Award in 1998.

Other corporate projects include buildings for Gap Inc., Nike, and Herman Miller. The Herman Miller SQA factory in Michigan includes a series of manmade wetlands that process and purify the building's stormwater. Set on 37 acres (15 ha), the 295,000 square feet (27,400 m^{2}) building is often called the GreenHouse.

He also received a commission for an environmental re-engineering of the River Rouge Plant for Ford Motor Company in Dearborn, Michigan. This project took twenty years and cost US$2 billion. The River Rouge Plant now includes the world's largest living roof; the 1,100,000 square feet (100,000 m^{2}) roof is covered with more than 10 acres (4.0 ha) of sedum.

His Flow House, designed for the Make It Right Foundation in New Orleans in 2009, incorporates solar and other passive energy designs such as deep overhangs and multiple connections with exterior areas that allow for daylight and natural ventilation. It also has roof-mounted solar panels, water cisterns to harvest rainwater runoff, and rain gardens to absorb any storm runoff.

Dedicated in 2012, the NASA Ames Research Center's Sustainability Base was designed to harvest more energy than it needs to operate and cleanse its water.McDonough designed it to meet a conventional budget and tight timeline, be a test bed for NASA technologies, and exceed LEED Platinum metrics. The facility is designed to "learn"—and continuously improve—over time.

In 2014, McDonough and his firm developed a master plan for Park 20|20, the first large-scale urban development in the Netherlands to adopt the cradle-to-cradle philosophy.

=== Completed works ===
Project name	Completed	Client	Location	References
EDF Headquarters	1984	Environmental Defense Fund	New York City, New York	
Herman Miller "Greenhouse" Factor and Offices	1995	Herman Miller	Holland, Michigan	
901 Cherry Office Building	1997	Gap, Inc.; now home to YouTube	San Bruno, California	
Nike European Headquarters	1999	Nike	Hilversum, Netherlands	
Adam Joseph Lewis Center for Environmental Studies	2000	Oberlin College	Oberlin, Ohio	
Ford River Rouge Complex	2002	Ford Motor Company	Dearborn, Michigan.	
Visitor Center	2005	Bernheim Arboretum and Research Forest	Clermont, Kentucky	
David Allan Hubbard Library	2009	Fuller Theological Seminary	Pasadena, California	
American University School of International Service	2010	American University	Washington, D.C.	
Greenbridge	2010	Greenbridge Developments LLC	Chapel Hill, North Carolina	
BSH Hausgeräte Office	2011	Delta Development Group/Park 20|20	Hoofddorp, Netherlands	
NASA Sustainability Base	2012	NASA–Ames Research Center	Mountain View, California	
Meadow Farm House	2013	private residence	Northern California	
Hero Motocorp Garden Factory and Global Parts Center, Phase I	2014	Hero MotoCorp	Neemrana, India	
Dropbox Headquarters	2015	Kilroy Realty	San Francisco, California	
Method Manufacturing Facility	2015	Method (now owned by Ecover)	Chicago, Illinois	
Hero Global Center for Innovation and Technology	2016	Hero MotoCorp	Jaipur, India	
VMware Corporate Campus	2016	VMware	Palo Alto, California	
Co|Lab	2019	HITT Contracting	Falls Church, Virginia	

== Criticism ==
After being named one of Fast Company magazine's "Masters of Design" in 2004, the same magazine followed up in 2008 with a more critical look at McDonough entitled "Green Guru Gone Wrong." Interviewing many of McDonough's former colleagues, the magazine cited his failure to have any meaningful impact with his cradle-to-cradle program, his unsustainable suburban lifestyle, and his habit of misrepresenting his professional successes. It also noted that just 160 of his planned 30,000 products were green-certified, and that he trademarked the term "cradle-to-cradle" even though it was coined by Swiss architect Walter Stahel many years beforehand.

In 2008, McDonough's Huangbaiyu project was heavily covered by the press for its many design issues, including conflicts between Feng Shui and passive solar design standards, including garages although no villagers could afford cars, failing to provide space for grazing livestock, and building houses out of potentially unsafe compressed coal dust. In 2008, a PBS Frontline investigation found that McDonough's poor planning and execution of the Huangbaiyu project had doomed it to failure from the start.

== Awards and honors ==
In 1996, McDonough became the first individual recipient of the Presidential Award for Sustainable Development. In 1999, Time called him "Hero for the Planet". In 2004, he received a National Design Award for environmental design from the Cooper Hewitt, Smithsonian Design Museum.

In 2013, Stanford University Libraries began the William McDonough "Living Archive". At the 2017 World Economic Forum in Davos, Switzerland, he received the Fortune Award for Circular Economy Leadership for his outstanding contribution to the development of a prosperous and sustainable economy.

Fortune named McDonough one of the World's 50 Greatest Leaders in 2019 in recognition of his contributions to the green building movement, being a leading proponent of the circular economy, and his efforts to redesign plastics. He was also profiled by Vanity Fair, Discover, and Time.

== Publications ==
- McDonough, William and Braungart, Michael. Cradle to Cradle: Remaking the Way We Make Things. North Point Press, 2002. ISBN 0-86547-587-3
- McDonough, William and Braungart, Michael. The Upcycle: Beyond Sustainability - Designing for Abundance. North Point Press, 2013. ISBN 9780865477483
- William McDonough. "Carbon Is Not the Enemy." Nature 539 (November 2016): 349–351.

== See also ==
- Hannover Principles
- Sustainable design
- Ecological modernization
