= Regenerative design =

Process-oriented whole systems approach to design

Regenerative design is about designing systems and solutions that work with or mimic the ways that natural ecosystems return energy from less usable forms to more usable forms. Regenerative design uses systems thinking and other approaches to create resilient and equitable systems that integrate the needs of society and the well-being of nature. Regenerative design is an active topic of discussion in engineering, economics, medicine, landscape design, food systems, and urban design & community development generally.

In the 1970s, John T. Lyle introduced the term “regenerative design”, arguing that conventional sustainable design approaches would primarily maintain existing conditions rather than repair ecological imbalances created by human development. Lyle later elaborated on these ideas in his book Regenerative Design for Sustainable Development (1994), in which he outlined a series of regenerative strategies, including an emphasis on working with natural systems.

The regenerative design paradigm encourages designers to use systems thinking, applied permaculture design principles, and community development processes to design human and ecological systems. The development of regenerative design has been influenced by approaches found in biomimicry, biophilic design, net-positive design, ecological economics, circular economics, as well as social movements such as permaculture, transition and the new economy. Regenerative design can also refer to the process of designing systems such as restorative justice, rewilding and regenerative agriculture.

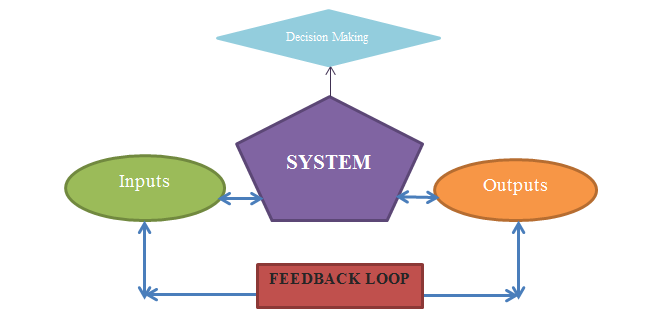
Feedback loop used in regenerative design

Regenerative design is increasingly being applied in such sectors as agriculture, architecture, community planning, cities, enterprises, economics and ecosystem regeneration. These designers are using green or sustainable design principles observed in systems ecology and recognize that ecosystems that are resilient typically operate in closed loop systems. Using such models, regenerative design seeks feedback at every stage of the design process. Feedback loops are integral to regenerative systems as understood by processes used in restorative practice and community development.

Regenerative design is interconnected with the approaches of systems thinking and with New Economy movement. The 'new economy' considers that the current economic system needs to be restructured. The theory is based on the assumption that people and the planet should come first, and that it is human well-being, not economic growth, which should be prioritized.

Whereas the weak definition of sustainable development was to satisfy fundamental human needs today without compromising the possibility of future generations to satisfy theirs, the goal of sustainable design was to develop restorative systems that are beneficial for humans and other species. Sustainable design is participatory, iterative and individual to the community and environment it is applied to. It intends to revitalize communities, human and natural resources, and society as a whole.

In recent years regenerative design is made possible on a larger scale using open source socio- technical platforms and technological systems as used in SMART cities. It includes community and city development processes like gathering feedback, participatory governance, sortition and participatory budgeting.

== History ==
=== Permaculture ===
The term permaculture was developed and coined by David Holmgren, then a graduate student at the Tasmanian College of Advanced Education's Department of Environmental Design, and Bill Mollison, senior lecturer in environmental psychology at University of Tasmania, in 1978. The word permaculture originally referred to "permanent agriculture", but was expanded to stand also for "permanent culture", as it was understood that social aspects were integral to a truly sustainable system as inspired by Masanobu Fukuoka's natural farming philosophy. Regenerative design is integral to permaculture design.

In 1974, David Holmgren and Bill Mollison first started working together to develop the theory and practice of permaculture. They met when Mollison spoke at a seminar at the Department of Environmental Design and began to work together. During their first three years together Mollison worked at applying their ideas, and Holmgren wrote the manuscript for what would become Permaculture One: a perennial agricultural system for human settlements as he completed his environmental design studies, and submitted it as the major reference for his thesis. He then handed the manuscript to Mollison for editing and additions, before it was published in 1978.

=== Regenerative organic agriculture ===
Robert Rodale, son of American organic pioneer and Rodale Institute founder J.I. Rodale, coined the term 'regenerative organic agriculture.' The term distinguished a kind of farming that goes beyond simply 'sustainable yield'. Regenerative organic agriculture "takes advantage of the natural tendencies of ecosystems to regenerate when disturbed. In that primary sense it is distinguished from other types of agriculture that either oppose or ignore the value of those natural tendencies." This type of farming is marked by "tendencies towards closed nutrient loops, greater diversity in the biological community, fewer annuals and more perennials, and greater reliance on internal rather than external resources."

John T. Lyle (1934–1998), a landscape architecture professor saw the connection between concepts developed by Bob Rodale for regenerative agriculture and the opportunity to develop regenerative systems for all other aspects of the world. While regenerative agriculture focused solely on agriculture, Lyle expanded its concepts and use to all systems. Lyle understood that when developing for other types of systems, more complicated ideas such as entropy and emergy must be taken into consideration.

=== In the built environment ===
In 1976, Lyle challenged his landscape architecture graduate students at California State Polytechnic University, Pomona to "envision a community in which daily activities were based on the value of living within the limits of available renewable resources without environmental degradation." Over the next few decades an eclectic group of students, professors and experts from around the world and crossing many disciplines developed designs for an institute to be built at Cal Poly Pomona. In 1994, the Lyle Center for Regenerative Studies opened after two years of construction. In that same year Lyle's book Regenerative Design for Sustainable Development was published by Wiley. In 1995 Lyle worked with William McDonough at Oberlin College on the design of the Adam Joseph Lewis Center for Environmental Studies completed in 2000. In 2002, McDonough's book Cradle to Cradle: Remaking the Way We Make Things was published, expanding on the concepts developed by Lyle. Swiss architect Walter R. Stahel developed approaches entirely similar to Lyle's also in the late 1970s but instead coined the term cradle-to-cradle design made popular by McDonough and Michael Braungart.

Sim Van Der Ryn is an architect, author, and educator with more than 40 years of experience integrating ecological principles into the built environment. Author of eight publications, one of his most influential books titled Ecological Design, published in 1996, provides a framework for integrating human design with living systems. The book challenges designers to push beyond "green building" to create buildings, infrastructure and landscapes that truly restore and regenerative of the surrounding ecosystems.

The artist and designer Michael Singer, working with his studio and collaborators, has contributed to regenerative design through a series of built projects on land and in aquatic environments. His Living Dock (2009) in West Palm Beach, Florida incorporates red mangrove planters and a floating oyster bed constructed from recycled oyster shell, and complements his nearby South Cove Regeneration Project, which includes constructed mangrove islands, oyster beds, and seagrass habitats. These projects employ ecological processes to support the regeneration of degraded benthic conditions in an urban waterfront setting. Singer also collaborated with Behnisch & Partner on the Alterra Atria Gardens (1998) at Wageningen Environmental Research in the Netherlands, a project integrating biologically based water treatment systems into the building and landscape design. Another project, the Sculptural Biofiltration Wall for the Seminole Tribe of Florida, utilizes solar power with biological and mechanical filtration systems to treat 150,000 gallons of water daily. These projects have been cited as examples of integrating ecological systems into built environments to support regenerative outcomes.

The Living Building Challenge (LBC) is recognized as the most progressive green building standard that can be applied to any building type around the world. The goal is to create Living Buildings that incorporate regenerative design solutions that actually improve the local environment rather than simply reducing harm. LBC was created by Jason F. McLennan and administered by the non-profit International Living Future Institute (ILFI), a global network dedicated to creating a healthy future for all. In addition to the Living Building Challenge, ILFI runs the Living Community Challenge, Living Product Challenge, Net Zero Energy Certification, the Cascadia Green Building Council, Ecotone Publishing, Declare, JUST and other leading-edge programs.

"What if every single act of design and construction made the world a better place?" — The Living Building Challenge (LBC).

John Todd further advanced regenerative design through the development of “living machines”, systems that use ecological processes and organisms to treat and purify water.

=== Regenerative Cultures ===
Regenerative design advocate and author Daniel Christian Wahl argues that regenerative design is about sustaining "the underlying pattern of health, resilience and adaptability that maintain this planet in a condition where life as a whole can flourish." In his book, Designing Regenerative Cultures, he argues that regeneration is not simply a technical, economic, ecological or social shift, but has to go hand-in-hand with an underlying shift in the way we think about ourselves, our relationships with each other and with life as a whole.

== Green vs. sustainable vs. regenerative vs net positive ==
There is an important distinction that should be made between the words 'green', 'sustainable', and 'regenerative' and how they influence design.

=== Green design ===
In the article Transitioning from green to regenerative design, Raymond J. Cole explores the concept of regenerative design and what it means in relation to 'green' and 'sustainable' design. Cole identifies eight key attributes of green buildings:

1. Reduces damage to natural or sensitive sites
2. Reduces the need for new infrastructure
3. Reduces the impacts on natural feature and site ecology during construction
4. Reduces the potential environmental damage from emissions and outflows
5. Reduces the contributions to global environmental damage
6. Reduces resource use – energy, water, materials
7. Minimizes the discomfort of building occupants
8. Minimizes harmful substances and irritants within building interiors

By these eight key attributes, 'green' design is accomplished by reducing the harmful, damaging and negative impacts to both the environment and humans that result from the construction of the built environment. Another characteristic that separates 'green' design is that it is aimed at broad market transformation and therefore green building assessment frameworks and tools are typically generic in nature.

=== Sustainable design ===
Sustainable design lies within a balance of economical, environmental and social responsibilities

'Sustainable' and 'green' are for the most part used interchangeably; however, there is a slight distinction between them. 'Green' design is centralized around specifically decreasing environmental impacts from human development, whereas sustainability can be viewed through an environmental, economic or social lens. The implication is that sustainability can be incorporated into all three aspects of the Triple Bottom Line: people, planet, profit.

The definition of sustainable or sustainability has been widely accepted as the ability to meet the needs of the current generation without depleting the resources needed to meet the needs of future generations. It "promotes a bio-centric view that places the human presence within a larger natural context, and focuses on constraints and on fundamental values and behavioral change." David Orr defines two approaches to sustainability in his book Ecological Literacy: "technological sustainability" and "ecological sustainability." "Technological sustainability" emphasizes the anthropocentric view by focusing on making technological and engineering processes more efficient whereas "ecological sustainability" emphasizes the bio-centric view and focuses on enabling and maintaining the essential and natural functions of ecosystems.

The sustainability movement has gained momentum over the last two decades, with interest from all sectors increasing rapidly each year. In the book Regenerative Development and Design: A Framework for Evolving Sustainability, the Regenesis Group asserts that the sustainability "debate is shifting from whether we should work on sustainability to how we're going to get it done." Sustainability was first viewed as a "steady state of equilibrium" in which there was a balance between inputs and outputs with the idea that sustainable practices meant future resources were not compromised by current processes. As this idea of sustainability and sustainable building has become more widely accepted and adopted, the idea of "net-zero" and even "net-positive" have become topics of interest. These relatively newer concepts focus on positively impacting the surrounding environment of a building rather than simply reducing the negative impacts.

=== Regenerative design ===
J.T. Gibberd argued "a building is an element set within wider human endeavors and is necessarily dependent on this context. Thus, a building can support sustainable patterns of living, but in and of itself cannot be sustainable" Regenerative design goes a step further than sustainable design. In a regenerative system, feedback loops allow for adaptability, dynamism and emergence to create and develop resilient and flourishing eco-systems. Cole highlights a key distinction of regenerative design is the recognition and emphasis of the "co-evolutionary, partnered relationship between human and natural systems" and thus importance of project location and place. Bruno Duarte Dias asserts that regenerative design goes beyond the traditional weighing and measuring of various environmental, social and economic impacts of sustainable design and instead focuses on mapping relationships. Dias is in agreement with Cole stating three fundamental aspects of regenerative design which include: understanding place and its unique patterns, designing for harmony within place, and co-evolution.

Net-positive design

Positive Development (PD) theory and net-positive design emerged from 2002 as a critique of sustainable and regenerative design. It argued that buildings, landscapes and infrastructure that restore the damage they do over their lifecycle are, in reality, negative in the context of the overshoot of planetary boundaries. The thesis was that buildings could in fact have net positive (global) outcomes that reverse ecocide and environmental injustices. However, as the textbook Positive Development explained - current institutions of governance, planning, and decision-making, as well as design, must be redesigned and retrofitted on radically different premises.

A subsequent 2020 textbook, Net-Positive Design, detailed the theory and explained the 'STARfish' net-positive design app, a free online resource, which guides (synergistic, adaptable and multi-functional) net-positive design. The app is also used for building assessment. The STARfish inverts three dozen fundamental flaws with both quantitative and qualitative green building certification or rating tools. In Positive Development, a building is not sustainable if it merely has more good than bad impacts. It must increase natural and social life-support systems in absolute (global) terms - sufficient to reverse its share of the cumulative and remote impacts of human expansion and consumption.

== Fundamental aspects ==
=== Co-evolution of humans and nature ===
Regenerative design is built on the idea that humans and the built environment exist within natural systems and thus, the built environment should be designed to co-evolve with the surrounding natural environment. Dias asserts that a building should serve as a "catalyst for positive change." The project does not end with the completion of construction and certificate of occupancy, instead the building serves to enhance the relationships between people, the built environment and the surrounding natural systems over a long period of time.

=== Designing in context of place ===
Understanding the location of the project, the unique dynamics of the site and the relationship of the project to the living natural systems is a fundamental concept in the regenerative design process. In their article Designing from place: a regenerative framework and methodology, Pamela Mang and Bill Reed define place as a "unique, multilayered network of living systems within a geographic region that results from the complex interactions, through time, of the natural ecology (climate, mineral and other deposits, soil, vegetation, water and wildlife, etc.) and culture (distinctive customs, expressions of values, economic activities, forms of association, ideas for education, traditions, etc.)" A systems-based approach to design in which the design team looks at the building within the larger system is crucial.

==== Gardener analogy ====
Beatrice Benne and Pamela Mang emphasize the importance of the distinction between working with a place rather than working on a place within the regenerative design process. They use an analogy of a gardener to re-define the role of a designer in the building process. "A gardener does not 'make' a garden. Instead, a skilled gardener is one who has developed an understanding of the key processes operating in the garden" and thus the gardener "makes judicious decisions on how and where to intervene to reestablish the flows of energy that are vital to the health of the garden." In the same way a designer does not create a thriving ecosystem rather they make decisions that indirectly influence whether the ecosystem degrades or flourishes over time. This requires designers to push beyond the prescriptive and narrow way of thinking they have been taught and use complex systems thinking that will be ambiguous and overwhelming at times. This includes accepting that the solutions do not exclusively lie in technological advancements and are instead a combination of sustainable technologies and an understanding of the natural flow of resources and underlying ecological processes. Benne and Mang identify these challenges and state the most difficult of these will be shifting from a mechanistic to an ecological worldview. The tendency is to view building as the physical processes of the structure rather than the complex network of relationships the building has with the surrounding environment including the natural systems and the human community.

=== Conservation vs. preservation ===
Regenerative design places more importance on conservation and biodiversity rather than on preservation. It is recognized in regenerative design that humans are a part of natural ecosystems. To exclude people is to create dense areas that destroy pockets of existing ecosystems while preserving pockets of ecosystems without allowing them to change naturally over time.

== Regenerative design frameworks ==
There are a few regenerative design frameworks that have been developed in recent years. Unlike many green building rating systems, these frameworks are not prescriptive checklists. Instead they are conceptual and meant to guide dialogue throughout the design process. They should not be used exclusively rather in conjunction with existing green building rating systems such as LEED, BREEAM or Living Building Challenge.

=== REGEN ===
The regenerative design framework REGEN was proposed by Berkebile Nelson Immenschuh McDowell (BNIM), a US architectural firm, for the US Green Building Council (USGBC). The tool was intended to be a web-based, data-rich framework to guide dialogue between professionals in the design and development process as well as "address the gap in information and integration of information." The framework has three components:

- Framework – the framework encourages systems thinking and collaboration as well as linking individual strategies to the goals of the project as a whole
- Resources – the framework includes place-based data and information for project teams to use
- Projects – the framework includes examples of successful projects that have incorporated regenerative ideas into the design as models for project teams

=== LENSES ===
Living Environments in Natural, Social and Economic Systems (LENSES) was created by Colorado State University's Institute for the Built Environment. The framework is intended to be process-based rather than product-based. The goals of the framework include:

- to direct the development of eco-regional guiding principles for living built environments
- to illustrate connections and relationships between sustainability issues
- to guide collaborative dialogue
- to present complex concepts quickly and effectively to development teams and decision-makers

The framework consists of three "lenses": Foundational Lens, Aspects of Place Lens and Flows Lens. The lenses work together to guide the design process, emphasizing the guiding principles and core values, understanding the delicate relationship between building and place and how elements flow through the natural and human systems.

==== Case study – VanDusen Botanical Garden ====
The Visitor Centre at the VanDusen Botanical Garden in Vancouver, British Columbia was designed in parallel with the regenerative design framework developed by Perkins+Will. The site of the new visitor center was 17,575 m^{2} and the building itself 1,784 m^{2}. A four-stage process was identified and included: education and project aspirations, goal setting, strategies and synergies, and whole systems approaches. Each stage raises important questions that require the design team to define place and look at the project in a much larger context, identify key resources flows and understand the complex holistic systems, determine synergistic relationships and identify approaches that provoke the coevolution of both humans and ecological systems. The visitor centre was the first project that Perkins+Will worked on in collaboration with an ecologist. Incorporating an ecologist on the project team allowed the team to focus on the project from a larger scale and understand how the building and its specific design would interact with the surrounding ecosystem through its energy, water and environmental performance.

== For retrofitting existing buildings ==
=== Importance and implications ===
It is said that the majority of buildings estimated to exist in the year 2050 have already been built. Additionally, current buildings account for roughly 40 percent of the total energy consumption within the United States. This means that in order to meet climate change goals – such as the Paris Agreement on Climate Change – and reduce greenhouse gas emissions, existing buildings need to be updated to reflect sustainable and regenerative design strategies.

=== Strategies ===
Craft et al. attempted to create a regenerative design model that could be applied to retrofitting existing buildings. This model was prompted by the large number of currently existing buildings projected to be present in 2050. The model presented in this article for building retrofits follows a 'Levels of Work' framework consisting of four levels that are said to be pertinent in increasing the "vitality, viability and capacity for evolution" which require a deep understanding of place and how the building interacts with the natural systems. These four levels are classified as either proactive or reactive and include regenerate, improve, maintain and operate.

=== Case study ===
==== University of New South Wales ====
Craft et al. present a case study in which the chemical science building at the University of New South Wales was retrofitted to incorporate these regenerative design principles. The strategy uses biophilia to improve occupants health and wellbeing by strengthening their connection to nature. The facade acts as a "vertical ecosystem" by providing habitats for indigenous wildlife to increase biodiversity. This included the addition of balconies to increase the connection between humans and nature.

== Regenerative agriculture ==
Regenerative farming or 'regenerative agriculture' calls for the creation of demand on agricultural systems to produce food in a way that is beneficial to the production and the ecology of the environment. It uses the science of systems ecology, and the design and application through permaculture. As understanding of its benefits to human biology and ecological systems that sustain us is increased as has the demand for organic food. Organic food grown using regenerative and permaculture design increases the biodiversity and is used to develop business models that regenerate communities. Whereas some foods are organic some are not strictly regenerative because it is not clearly seeking to maximize biodiversity and the resilience of the environment and the workforce. Regenerative agriculture grows organic produce through ethical supply chains, zero waste policies, fair wages, staff development and wellbeing, and in some cases cooperative and social enterprise models. It seeks to benefit the staff along the supply chain, customers, and ecosystems with the outcome of human and ecological restoration and regeneration.

== Size of regenerative systems ==
The size of the regenerative system affects the complexity of the design process. The smaller a system is designed the more likely it is to be resilient and regenerative. Multiple small regenerative systems that are put together to create larger regenerative systems help to create supplies for multiple human-inclusive-ecological systems.

== See also ==
- Adam Joseph Lewis Center for Environmental Studies
- Appropriate technology
- Bioretention
- Booker T. Whatley
- Ecological design
- Forest restoration
- Circular economy
- Cradle to cradle
- Landscape urbanism
- Nature-based solutions
- Permaculture
- Regenerative agriculture
- Regenerative economics
- Resource recovery
- Sustainability
- Walter R. Stahel
