= Jeff Biggers =

American author

Jeff Biggers (born in 1963) is an American Book Award-winning historian, journalist, playwright, novelist and monologist. He is the author and editor of twelve books. His most recent nonfiction book, In Sardinia: An Unexpected Journey in Italy, is a cultural history and travelogue of the island. In the fall of 2024, he published his debut novel, Disturbing the Bones, coauthored with celebrated film director Andrew Davis. Biggers also wrote the introduction to author William Demby's classic novel on Rome, The Catacombs, in 2026.

According to Yale Climate Connection, Biggers is "a prominent author and activist writing extensively about environmental and climate issues", performing and lecturing frequently at festivals, theatres, conferences, universities and schools across the United States and Italy.

As the founder of the Climate Narrative Project, he has served as the Climate Narrative Playwright-in-Residence at Indiana University Northwest, Writer-in-Residence in the Office of Sustainability at the University of Iowa, and as the Campbell-Stripling Distinguished Writer-in-Residence at Wesleyan College in Georgia. As part of his climate narrative work, Biggers is the author and performer of the "Ecopolis Monologues," in which he envisions ways for regenerative city initiatives. Adapted to local initiatives and history, the Ecopolis monologues had been performed at conferences, universities and theatre venues throughout America, and in Sardinia, and Italy.

In 2008, Biggers wrote a series of articles calling for a Green New Deal. As the grandson of a coal miner from southern Illinois, Jeff Biggers has been a vocal critic of mountaintop removal in Appalachia and strip mining across the nation, poorly enforced black lung and mining workplace safety laws, and the fallacy of "clean coal" slogans. Biggers' dispatches and reports from coal mining regions around the world have been collected at the Reckoning in Appalachia website.

== Writing career ==
=== Non-fiction and fiction books ===
Biggers has been called an "itinerant storyteller" by Chicago journalist Kari Lyderson. Biggers stresses an approach of historical storytelling he calls "re-storification," the process of unearthing and forging new stories, rituals, and gatherings that recover the withered or denied strands of history and reshape its continuum between the past and present.

Focused on marginalized regions and recovering hidden histories, Biggers has written cultural histories, travel memoir and journalistic reportage based in Appalachia, the American Midwest, the US-Mexico borderlands, Mexico, India and Italy.

Published in 2006, The United States of Appalachia argues that beyond its mythology in the American imagination, Appalachia has long been a vanguard region in the United States-—a cradle of U.S. freedom and independence, and a hotbed for literature and music. Some of the most quintessential and daring American innovations, rebellions, and social movements have emerged from an area often stereotyped as a quaint backwater, he says, and in the process, immigrants from the Appalachian diaspora have become some of America's most famous leaders. The Asheville Citizen-Times reviewed it as a "masterpiece of popular history...revelations abound." One reviewer said the book is "full of historical insights...debunking stereotypes is one of the driving motivations behind Biggers' writing."

==== In the Sierra Madre ====
Published in 2006, In the Sierra Madre is a memoir and narrative nonfiction history that chronicles the life and times in one of the most famous, yet unknown, regions in the world. Based on his one-year sojourn among the native Rarámuri/Tarahumara of Mexico, Biggers examines the ways of a resilient indigenous culture in the Americas, the exploits of the Mexican mountaineers, and the parade of argonauts and accidental travelers that has journeyed into the Sierra Madre over centuries. From African explorers, Bohemian friars, Confederate and Irish war deserters, French poets, Boer and Russian commandos, hidden Apache and Mennonite communities, bewildered archaeologists, addled writers, and legendary characters like Antonin Artaud, B. Traven, Sergei Eisenstein, George Patton, Geronimo and Pancho Villa, Biggers searches for the legendary treasures of the Sierra Madre (Mexico's Copper Canyon). In the Sierra Madre won the gold medal in Foreword Magazine's Book of the Year Awards (Travel Essays) in 2006, and the Illinois Arts Council Nonfiction Award. The memoir was called by Booklist "an astonishing sojourn" in 2006.

==== Reckoning at Eagle Creek ====
Published in 2010, "Reckoning at Eagle Creek: The Secret Legacy of Coal in the Heartland" is a family saga, part memoir, cultural history, and journalistic investigation, examining the impact of coal mining on Biggers' native region of southern Illinois. The book examines the loss of his family's 200-year-old homestead to strip mining, and the historical parallel impact of coal mining on communities and their environment. It won the Sierra Club's David Brower Award in 2010, and the Delta Prize for Literature. Looking back to the removal of Native Americans, the book laces the history of Biggers' own family, including the destruction of their 200-year-old historic community in the Shawnee forests into the development of the coal industry, African slavery and coal mining, the history of workplace safety and labor union struggles, and environmental and heritage movements against strip-mining and coal-fired plants. Publishers Weekly called it "part historical narrative, part family memoir, part pastoral paean, and part jeremiad against the abuse of the land and of the men who gave and continue to give their lives to (and often for) the mines, [Reckoning at Eagle Creek] puts a human face on the industry that supplies nearly half of America’s energy…it offers a rare historical perspective on the vital yet little considered industry, along with a devastating critique of the myth of ‘clean coal.’ ”

==== State Out of the Union ====
Published in 2012, Publishers Weekly selected "State Out of the Union: Arizona and the Final Showdown Over the American Dream," as a Top Ten Title in Social Science. "State Out of the Union" was described by Kirkus Reviews as "masterful at showing how the past is prologue… A timely book, especially with immigration policy playing a major role in the upcoming presidential campaign.” In reviewing "State Out of the Union," Progressive Magazine said: “the title of Jeff Biggers’s sweeping chronicle of Arizona, State Out of the Union, fittingly evokes Lincoln’s ominous words at the outset of the Civil War… Biggers’s lesson for his readers is that throughout its century of turmoil, Arizona’s cycles of conflict move in a progressive trajectory. While many political movements have put down roots in the state, the paths their struggles collectively blaze for the country ultimately point toward emancipation.” Another critic said, "for Jeff Biggers what the immigration policy of this country should be is as clear as unpolluted, smog-free air, and crystal clean, unchemicalized water. Biggers, an author, journalist, storyteller, and playwright is not typical, however. His knowledge and writings about vital trending issues ... run far and wide. He is a discerning advocate. He has followed and joined the immigration movement in Arizona before and after the fashioning of SB1070."

==== Trials of a Scold ====
Published in 2017, "Trials of a Scold: The Incredible True Story of Writer Anne Royall" was longlisted for the PEN/Jacqueline Bograd Weld Award for Biography (2018), and chronicles the life and times of pioneering writer and muckraker Anne Royall.

==== Resistance: Reclaiming an American Tradition ====
Published in 2018, Resistance is a "widely ranging history of intellectual and moral resistance within American politics," according to Kirkus Reviews. It includes portraits of Native American and early American figures, and the American legacy of resistance to duplicitous authority for civil rights, women's rights, immigrant rights, environmental protection, free speech. In an interview with PEN American, Biggers said, "In dealing with the most challenging issues of every generation, resistance to duplicitous civil authority and its corporate enablers has defined our quintessential American story." Social critic Jeff Chang called his most recent book, "Resistance: Reclaiming an American Tradition", "powerful, urgent essays."

==== In Sardinia ====
Published in 2023, In Sardinia is a cultural history and travelogue based on Biggers' sojourn in Sardinia, and his travels around the island. Kirkus Reviews called the book "a fascinating journey." According to Frances Mayes, New York Times bestselling author of Under the Tuscan Sun: “At last, a grand companion to the mysterious and enchanting island of Sardinia. Known to most travelers for its beaches, Sardinia’s complex archeological heritage extends back to neolithic times. Jeff Biggers, the consummate traveler/ scholar, starts in beautiful Alghero and begins exploring the entire island, delving into the rich traditions of music, arts, dialects, crafts, and literature. Along the way, he and his family revel in local lore, festivals, food, and wine. Written with verve and love, In Sardinia is the book I’ll be taking on future trips.” The Wall Street Journal called it "erudite and enthusiastic."

Wanderlust Magazine in the UK picked In Sardinia as one of its "Best Travel Books of the Year" in 2023. Tygodnik Powszechny magazine in Poland picked In Sardinia as the #2 "best books of the year" in 2025.

==== Disturbing the Bones ====
Published in 2024, Disturbing the Bones was called an "intense, vivid action and the intricate interweaving of the two main plot threads elevate this above standard-issue disaster thrillers" by Publishers Weekly. In an interview with CultureBuzz magazine, Davis called the novel "a thriller with an urgent message" about nuclear weapons and social division.

=== Stage plays ===
Biggers is also a playwright, and performer of monologues.

Biggers has appeared on campuses and in cities across the US, Spain and Italy, performing adaptations of his "Ecopolis" monologues.

He has turned many of his books, including In the Sierra Madre and State Out of the Union, into monologue performances.

In Italy, Biggers co-founded the Mare Nostrum Theatre Project and has worked with Teatroaperto and other theatre groups in Italy.

Across the Stones of Fire

His first play, "4½ Hours: Across the Stones of Fir e," explores the fate of a family threatened by an impending strip mining operation in their community. The play toured nationally and appeared on Off-Broadway at the Gene Frankel Theatre in New York City on June 4–13, 2010.

Damnatio Memoriae

His published play, "Damnatio Memoriae: A Play, Una Commedia,'" (2015) was described by author Rilla Askew as "a timeless examination of human rights, human dignity, and what it means to be a "citizen," the play reveals forgotten stories while bringing to life the dilemmas of our modern world, reminding us that, in so many ways, they are one and the same." The play was produced in Bologna and Florence, Italy in 2017 and 2019. In Italy, Biggers founded the Mare Nostrum Theatre Project.

Kaminski's Lot

His play, "Kaminski's Lot", commissioned by Indiana University Northwest, deals with climate change and environmental justice. The play was produced at Theatre Northwest in Gary, Indiana in 2021, and selected by Broadway Green Alliance in New York City as a green theatre case study.

== Awards and honors ==
Biggers has won numerous awards and honors, including an American Book Award, the David Brower Award for Environmental Reporting, Foreword Magazine Book of the Year Award, Lowell Thomas Award for Travel Journalism, Delta Award for Literature, Plattner Award for Appalachian Literature, an Illinois Arts Council Creative Non-Fiction Award, the Garst Memorial Award for Media (UN Association Iowa), and a Field Foundation Fellowship. He is a contributing editor to The Bloomsbury Review, and is a member of the PEN American Center. His play, "4 1/2 Hours: Across the Stones of Fire," won the "Greener Planet Award" at the Planet Connections Theatre Festivity in New York City, and has appeared at theatres around the country. Blue Ridge Outdoors Magazine selected Biggers as one of its 100 Pioneers.

== Books ==
- Biggers, Jeff, Brosi, George and West, Don (2004), No Lonesome Road: Selected Prose and Poems by Don West. Urbana: University of Illinois Press. ISBN 0-252-07157-3
- Biggers, Jeff (2006), In the Sierra Madre. Urbana: University of Illinois Press. ISBN 0-252-03101-6
- Biggers, Jeff, (2006), The United States of Appalachia: How Southern Mountaineers Brought Independence, Culture and Enlightenment to America. Emeryville, CA: Shoemaker and Hoard. ISBN 978-1593760311
- Biggers, Jeff (2007), In the Sierra Madre. Urbana: University of Illinois Press. ISBN 0-252-03101-6 ISBN 978-0252074998
- Biggers, Jeff, (2007), The United States of Appalachia: How Southern Mountaineers Brought Independence, Culture and Enlightenment to America. Emeryville, CA: Shoemaker and Hoard. ISBN 978-1593761516
- Biggers, Jeff (2010), Reckoning at Eagle Creek: The Secret Legacy of Coal in the Heartland. New York: The Nation/Basic Books. ISBN 978-1-56858-421-8
- Biggers, Jeff (2011), "Dans La Sierra Madre". Paris: Albin Michel. ISBN 978-2-226-21504-8
- Biggers, Jeff (2011), "They'll Cut Off Your Project: A Mingo County Chronicle" by Huey Perry. Foreword by Jeff Biggers. Morgantown: WVU Press. ISBN 978-1-933202-79-2
- Biggers, Jeff (2012), "State Out of the Union: Arizona and the Final Showdown Over the American Dream." New York: Nation Books. ISBN 978-1-56858-702-8
- Biggers, Jeff (2014). "Reckoning at Eagle Creek: The Secret Legacy of Coal in the Heartland." Carbondale: SIU Press. ISBN 978-0809333868
- Biggers, Jeff (2015). "Damnatio Memoriae: A Play, Una Commedia." San Antonio, Texas: Wings Press. ISBN 978-1-60940-461-1
- Biggers, Jeff (2017), The Trials of a Scold: The Incredible True Story of Writer Anne Royall. New York: St. Martin's Press. ISBN 9781250065124
- Biggers, Jeff (2018). "Resistance: Reclaiming an American Tradition." Berkeley: Counterpoint Press. ISBN 9781640090477
- Biggers, Jeff (2023). "In Sardinia: Unexpected Journey in Italy," New York/London: Melville House. ISBN 9781685890261
- Biggers, Jeff (2024). °Disturbing the Bones,° New York/London: Melville House. ISBN 978-1685891459
- Biggers, Jeff (2025). "Sardynia: Podróż w czasie," Warsaw Poland: Wydawnicza. ISBN 978-83-8396-040-1
- Biggers, Jeff (2026), introduction to °The Catacombs,° by William Demby. New York: Vintage. ISBN 979-8217007332
