= Ignacio Solano =

Spanish Biologist and landscaper

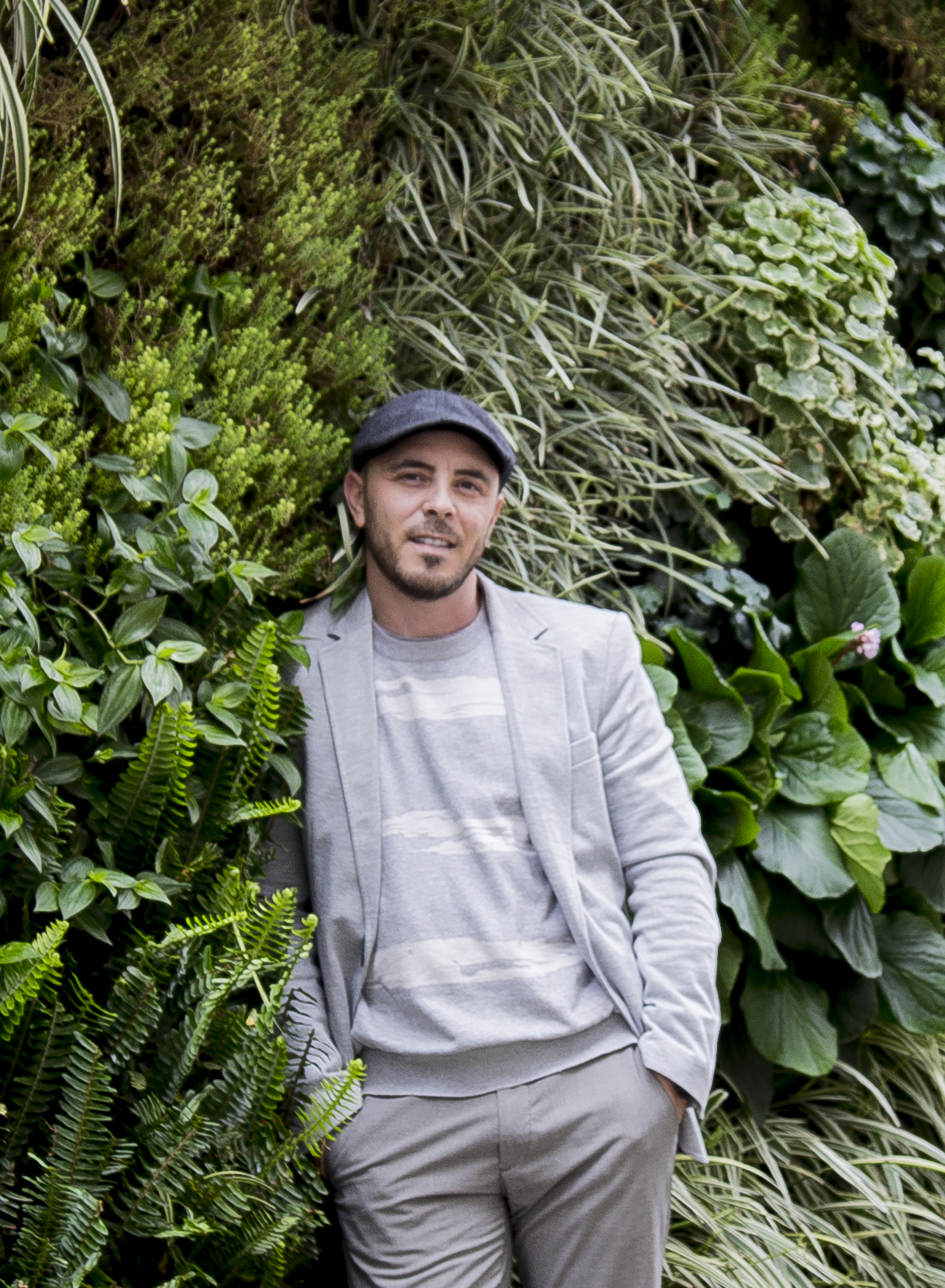
- Born: 17 June 1977 (age 48); Spain
- Occupations: Landscaper and botanical investigator
- Works: Definitive Guide of the Vertical Garden

Ignacio Solano Cabello (born 17 June 1977) is a Spanish biologist and landscaper who designs and builds green walls.

He is the author of the Definitive Guide of the Vertical Garden.

== Biography ==
Ignacio Solano is the founder of the company Paisajismo Urbano, which designs and builds green walls, green facades, green roofs and other kinds of bioconstruction.

He has traveled in Latin America and the western Indian Ocean to study ecosystems.

In 2010 Solano studied mycorrhizal fungi in Madagascar which led to a green wall technique based on fungi and bacteria

With his technology, more than a hundred projects have been developed all around the world.

In 2012 he began teaching courses on vertical gardening.

In 2016 he published Definitive Guide of the Vertical Garden.

== Patented system ==
Ignacio Solano is author and owner of the patented system f + p for gardening facades. In turn, he is the inventor of the concept of Vertical Ecosystem, which includes vertical gardens and plant facades that have been developed with this system.

Vertical Ecosystems are based on the conception that vertical gardens resemble the natural ecosystems in their composition and in the way they function (especially those composed by epiphytes). They are composed of different plants that comprise the natural ecosystems, and so they resemble the relationships between the plants and the natural microorganisms. Therefore, conventional gardening concepts can not be applied for vertical gardening. In the words of Solano, "making a vertical garden is not just putting plants on a wall."

Ignacio Solano's patent corrects and perfects the concept of vertical garden designed by French landscape architect Patrick Blanc. The result is a hydroponic system, in which is used a phytogenerant material, the texture, porosity and absorptive capacity of which are suitable to perform the function of substrate. The system is fully automated, and environmental factors, water chemistry and the status of the plants are monitored by automation control. An automated irrigation system continuously supplies the water and micronutrients the plants need.

These improvements enhance the environmental benefits of vertical gardens: generate oxygen and absorb carbon dioxide, trap dust and heavy metals, serve as thermal insulation (saving on air conditioning in buildings) and reduce noise pollution.

Ignacio Solano has shown that his system works, not only because of all the vertical garden projects he has carried out in Spain and in the world, but also because the students in his courses have made vertical gardens with his system.

There are a number of benefits associated with installing our gardens in cities. These are some:

• Reduction of the risk of floods, since they retain a good part of the rainwater

• Enabling disused urban spaces

• Low water consumption, thanks to the use of a closed circuit

• In the case of these ecosystems, they do not attract or allow the proliferation of insects and bacteria, since this system provides a biological repellent.

• Multiple health benefits

and reduce your discomfort

== Projects ==
- 2022: The world's largest indoor vertical garden (Valencia, city of arts and sciences): 700 m2.
- 2018: Europe's largest indoor vertical garden (Madrid): 335 m2.
- 2016: Largest vertical garden in Greece: 120 m2.
- 2015: First vertical garden in Guatemala: 86 m2.
- 2015: The world's largest vertical garden in Bogotá (Colombia): 3,100 m2.
- 2014: Celebra building in Montevideo, Uruguay. 300 square meters.
- 2014: Green building in Medellín, Colombia. 288 square meters y 92 meters high. Collaboration with Groncol.
- 2013: FPEC, Bolivia. 73 square meters. Collaboration with Leonardo Teran.
- 2012: Hotel Gaia B3 of Bogotá, Colombia. 400 square meters. Collaboration with Groncol.
- 2012: Shopping center of Quito, Ecuador. 1,000 square meters. Collaboration with Greenstar.
- 2012: Armenia shopping center, Colombia. 200 square meters. Collaboration with Groncol.

== Research ==
Much of the knowledge of Ignacio Solano on plant behavior and relationships between species comes from his experience as a researcher in jungles around the world. In 1998 he made his first trip to Mexico, and since then has gone through different ecosystems. In his travels he is dedicated to find out how plants behave under different conditions and to collect small samples of species.

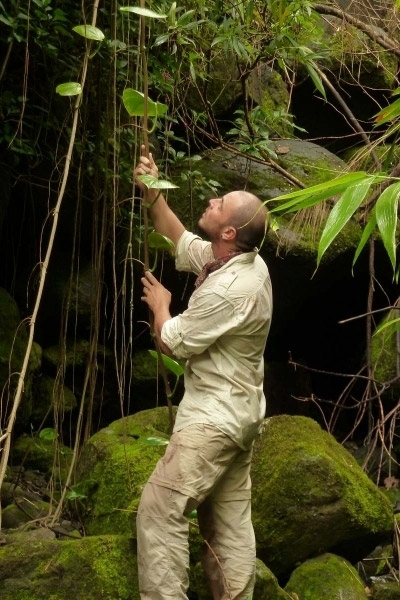
Ignacio Solano, Reunion Islands

Highlights his studies of epiphytes plants of tropical understory, as well as the discoveries made in the jungles of Madagascar (2017), Chocó jungles (2015), Forests of the Bolivian Chapare (2014), Selva Lacandona (2014), among other, which allowed him to develop a formula based on microorganisms that ensures the survival of the vertical gardens.

The last expedition that Ignacio Solano carried out was in the jungle of Panama in 2019, where he went in search of a mysterious frog.

It is one of the most difficult frogs to find. Ignacio Solano traveled the whole country in search of this peculiar little frog.

== Publications ==
- Definitive Guide of the Vertical Garden (2016): Theoretical and practical manual that describes and analyzes all technical aspects to be considered for the realization of vertical gardens. It includes a guide species of proven success in vertical gardening.
- In 2019 he released the second edition of his book, where we can appreciate an Ignacio Solano with more knowledge than ever about plants and their functioning in Vertical Ecosystems. The career that he has had has led him to carry out multiple projects, many of them awarded and which are still in operation today.

In addition to his two published books, Ignacio Solano has collaborated on the book 'Multifunctional Urban Green Infrastructure' edited by Editorial Agrícola Española with the creation of a chapter.

He was responsible for writing chapter 8, entitled 'Vertical Ecosystems: The Value of Fieldwork', which is included in the first part of the work, called Functional Activities.

Ignacio Solano, has had various appearances in different very relevant and important media outlets, but also in magazines such as National Geographic in 2018. This appearance in such a relevant magazine was for the construction of the largest vertical garden in the world located in Colombia.

== Awards and honours ==
- In the year 2023, Ignacio Solano, was awarded for the work carried out in the Caixaforum vertical garden in Valencia, by the Agrarian Forum Foundation: Awards for Urban Nature and Agriculture.
- Second prize: The Garden Suits. Urban Landscaping and Estudio Martín Maján. Urban Nature Awards 2019 of the Agrarian Forum: Professional Area
- First prize Urban Agriculture Professional Modality, Agrarian Forum 2017
- Award Cámara de Comercio a la Investigación (2009).
- Award Iberflora al Mejor Proyecto Sostenible (2011)

== Interviews and press ==
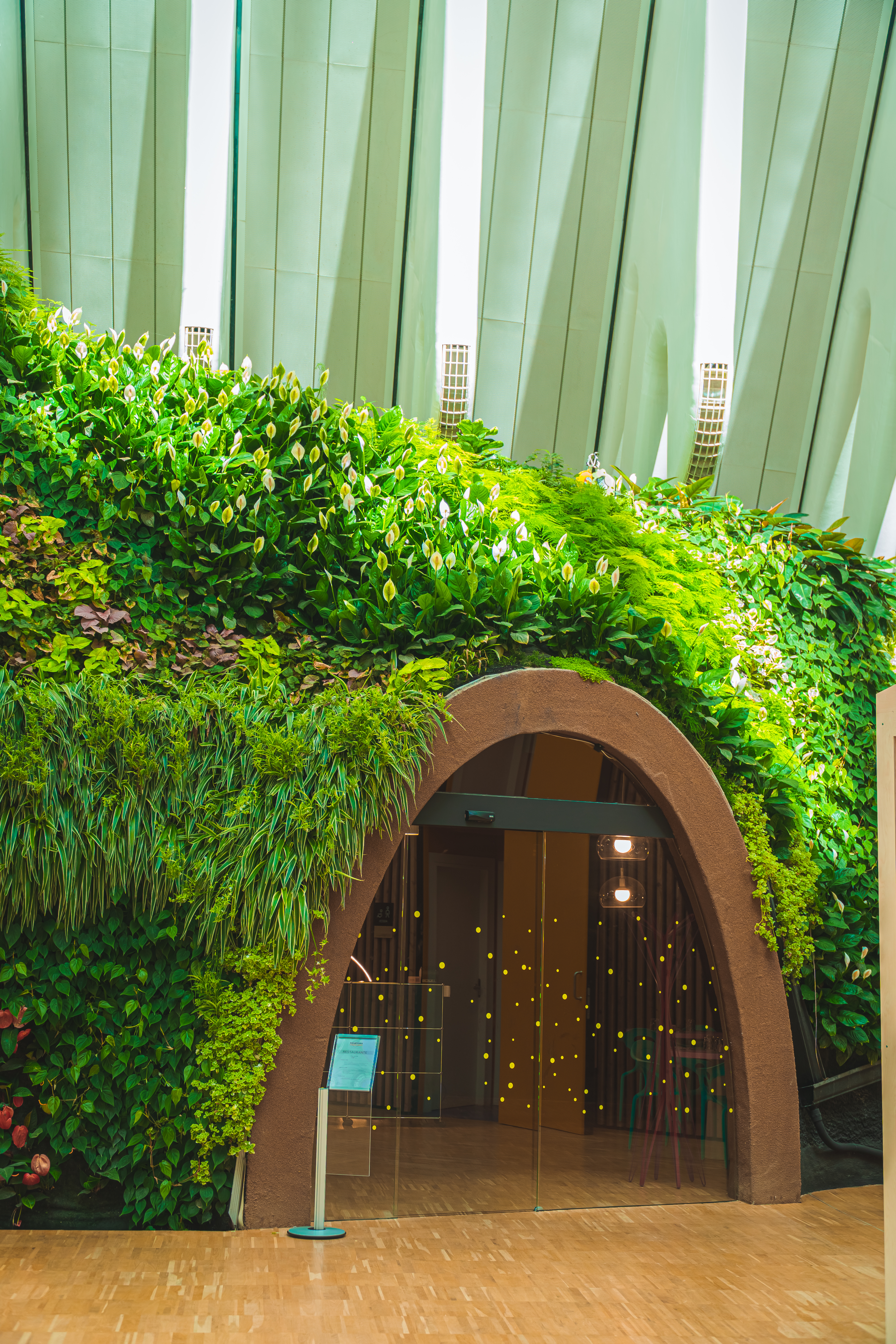
Europe's largest Vertical Garden created by Ignacio Solano

Ignacio Solano has been working with Vertical Ecosystems since he began, appearing in the press and in numerous television interviews.

Here we can see some of them:

=== Specialized Conferences ===
- Interview with Ignacio Solano on RTVE (2022)
- Interview with Ignacio Solano in Àpunt (2022)
- Entrepreneurs Elche – Alicante Chamber of Commerce (2020)
- Interview for Reduce Your Footprint (2020)
- Interview for TVE for the first program Escala Humana: “Verde que te quiero verde” (2019)
- World Green Infrastructure Congress in Bogotá – WGIC (2016)
- Interview with Ignacio Solano in the new TVE 2 Catalunya program, Inspira (2016)
- TEDxBarcelona talk: Cities with a green heart (2016)
- Talk at the Alicante Territorial College of Architects: The vegetal façade as a safe element in architecture (2015)
- Chair talk at the University of Alicante (2015)
- Talk at the Alicante Territorial College of Architects (2014)
- Talk at Glocalicante 2014: “New technologies and innovation”
- "Vertical ecosystems, living nature in architecture" (Veracruz, Mexico, 2012)
- "The regeneration of disturbed spaces with native plant species" (Veracruz, Mexico, 2012)

=== Television appearances ===
- Interview Ignacio Solano in Cadena SER of Radio Ceuta (2022)
- ÀpuntMedia Program The largest indoor vertical garden in Europe is located in Valencia
- La Sexta Noticias The largest vertical garden in Spain
- Channel 9 News The vertical garden
- Channel 9 News The largest indoor vertical garden in Spain
- ATB Bolivia live The first vertical garden in Bolivia
- La Sexta Noticias The "guru" of vertical gardens
- TeleSUR Colombia How the largest vertical garden in the world was made
- TV Guatemala Interview with Ignacio Solano
- Documentary Green Heart Madagascar
- Documentary Green Heart Colombia
- Documentary Green Heart Panama

=== Press Appearances ===
- The 'mysterious frog of panama' is filmed for the first time by Ignacio Solano from Ceuta - article in infoceuta.com, elfarodeceuta.es, ceutaactualidad.com, clarin.com
- The technique of the Spanish botanist Ignacio Solano travels to Reunion Island – article in ecoconstruccion.net
- 'El ceutí Solano crea el más grande jardín vertical interior de Europa' - article in ceutaactualidad.com, elpueblodeceuta.es, elfarodeceuta.es, ceutatv.com
- Available the video of how the Vertical Garden was built for the Benidorm AYTO – article in noticiascv.com, lasprovincias.es, elperiodic.com (2022)
- Culture-A documentary shows how the interior vertical garden of CaixaForum Valencia was made, 'the largest in Europe' - article in La Vanguardia, Diario Siglo XXI, 20 Minutos (2022)
- 'Málaga launches a 100 m2 vertical hydroponic garden with more than 3,000 plants' - article in Agroinformación (2022)
- 'The largest indoor vertical garden in Europe is Troba in Valencia' - article in ÀpuntMedia // Complete interview on YouTube Ignacio Solano (2022)
- 'The vertical garden of the CEU produces oxygen for 120 students a year' - article in Ondacero (2022)
- Solano: 'The city is lost in the world of vertical gardens' - article in Ceuta actualidad (2022)
- 'The new vertical garden in Benidorm filters more than 65 tons of harmful gases per year' - article in Noticias CV (2022)
- 'The largest indoor vertical garden in Europe has about 700 m2 and is in Valencia' - article in El Periodic, Pressdigital, Informa Valencia, Valencia Plaza, Valencia Bonita (2022)
- Article about the intervention in La Calahorra in Diseño de La Ciudad (2017)
- 'Walls with ecological awareness' - Management Magazine (2017)
- 'Ignacio Solano, responsible for designing the largest vertical garden in the world' - article in Las Provincias, El Mundo, Estrella Digital, La Vanguardia, ABC, Alicante Plaza, Finanzas.com, EFE, CiC, Ambientum, Diseño de la Ciudad, Cadena SER, Segundo Enfoque, EXTRA, Arquitectura y Empresa, HSB News, Better Buildings, Clean Energy XXI, Plataforma Arquitectura, El Tiempo, Archidaily, RT, The Epoch Times, Civic, Experimenta, La Prensa, El Salvadorgram, El Nacional, Environment Intelligent, The Greenest Post and Ecosiglos (2017)
- ''The lord of the green skies', Diario Información (2017)
- ''The man who paints vegetable murals', El Universal (2017)
- 'The vertical garden of more than 100 square meters in La Calahorra takes shape', Diario Información (2014).
- 'A man from Alicante develops a 'cocktail' of bacteria that prolongs the life of vertical gardens', Las Provincias (2013).
- 'A gigantic green wall', Diario Información (2013).
- 'Urban Landscaping stands out as a world leader in vertical gardens', Acceso.com (2013).
- 'Vertical gardens', La Razón (2012).
