= John T. Lyle =

American architect (1934–1998)

John T. Lyle (1934 – 1998) was an American architect who was a professor of landscape architecture at the California State Polytechnic University, Pomona (Cal Poly Pomona); the Lyle Center for Regenerative Studies at Cal Poly Pomona and the Lyle plaza at the entrance to Adam Joseph Lewis Center for Environmental Studies at Oberlin College are named after him.

He is the author of such books as Regenerative Design for Sustainable Development and Design for Human Ecosystems. Lyle was the principal architect for the Lyle Center for Regenerative Studies at Cal Poly Pomona and the principal landscape architect for the Adam Joseph Lewis Center for Environmental Studies at Oberlin College.
