= Living Building Challenge =

Sustainable building certification scheme

The Living Building Challenge is an international sustainable building certification program created in 2006. It is managed by the non-profit International Living Future Institute. It is described by the Institute as a philosophy, advocacy tool and certification program that promotes the measurement of sustainability in the built environment. It can be applied to development at all scales, from buildings—both in new constructions and renovations—to infrastructure, landscapes, neighborhoods, both urban and rural communities, and differs from other green certification programs such as LEED or BREEAM.

== History ==
The Living Building Challenge was launched in 2006 by the Cascadia Green Building Council (a chapter of both the U.S. Green Building Council and Canada Green Building Council). It was created by Jason F. McLennan and Bob Berkebile of BNIM, an architecture and design firm. McLennan brought the program to Cascadia when he became its CEO in 2006. The International Living Building Institute was created of and by Cascadia in May 2009 to oversee the Living Building Challenge and its auxiliary programs.

=== Evolution of the Living Building Standard ===
Dates	Event
October 1999	McLennan and Berkebile publish "The Living Building"
2005	McLennan begins to write the Living Building Standard.
May 2006	McLennan becomes CEO of Cascadia Green Building Council.
November 2006	Cascadia announces the Living Building Challenge at Greenbuild.
April 2007	Living Building Challenge Version 1.2 is published.
May 2009	International Living Building Institute is formed by Cascadia Green Building Council.
August 2009	Living Building Challenge Version 1.3 is published.
November 2009	Living Building Challenge Version 2.0 is published.
Fall 2010	First three projects earn Living certification.
April 2011	International Living Building Institute is renamed the International Living Future Institute.
January 2012	100th project registers for the Living Building Challenge.
May 2012	Living Building Challenge Version 2.1 is published.
June 2012	Living Building Challenge receives the Buckminster Fuller Challenge.
2013	Net Zero Energy Building Certification is released.
May 2014	Living Building Challenge Version 3.0 is released.
May 2014	200th project registers for the Living Building Challenge.
November 2015	300th project registers for the Living Building Challenge.
2016	Living Building Challenge Version 3.1 is published.

=== International Living Future Institute ===
The International Living Future Institute is a non-governmental organization (NGO) committed to catalyzing a global transformation toward true sustainability. The Institute seeks partnerships with leaders in the public, private and not-for-profit sectors in pursuit of a future that is socially just, culturally rich and ecologically restorative.

The Institute is the umbrella organization for the Living Building Challenge and the Cascadia Green Building Council, along with The Natural Step US and Ecotone Publishing.

== Intention ==
The end goal of the Living Building Challenge is to encourage the creation of a regenerative built environment. The challenge is an attempt "to raise the bar for building standards from doing less harm to contributing positively to the environment." It "acts to rapidly diminish the gap between current limits and the end-game positive solutions we seek" by challenging architects, contractors, and building owners.

=== Flower metaphor ===
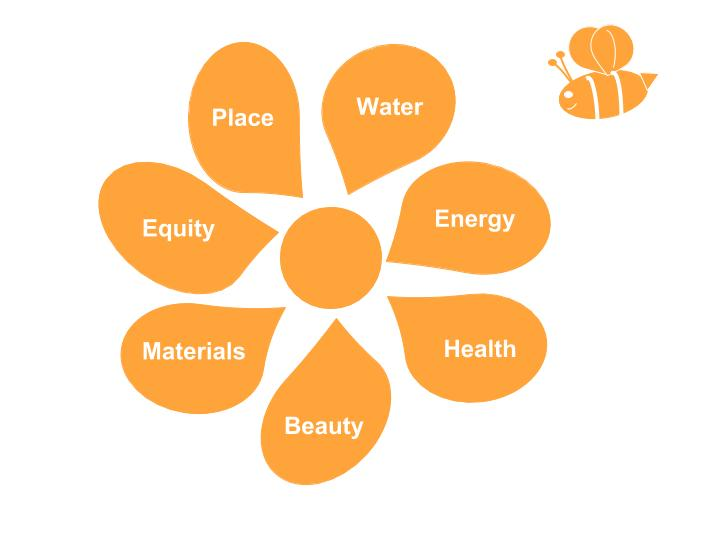
The representation of a flower with seven petals is used for the Living Building Challenge's framework.

The Living Building Challenge employs the use of a flower metaphor for the framework. According to founder Jason F. McLennan, flowers are an accurate representation of a truly regenerative building which receives all of its energy from the sun, nutrients from the soil, and water from the sky. Similar to a flower, they simultaneously shelter other organisms and support the surrounding ecosystem. They also serve as beauty and inspiration and adapt to their surroundings. Meanwhile, the petals of the flower represent each performance area in the framework. These petals include Materials, Place, Water, Energy, Health and Happiness, Equity, and Beauty.

Living Building Challenge has seven performance areas: site, water, energy, health and happiness, materials, equity and beauty.

== Process ==
Certification is based on actual, rather than modeled or anticipated, performance. Therefore, projects must be operational for at least 12 consecutive months prior to evaluation. Types of projects which can be certified include but are not limited to existing or new buildings, single-family residential, multi-family residential, institutional buildings (government, education, research, or religious), commercial (offices, hospitality, retail), and medical or laboratory buildings. There are 3 certification pathways, Living Building Certification, Petal Certification, and Zero Energy Certification a project can pursue, all of which are awarded on performance.
