= Vertical ecosystem =

Architectural gardening system

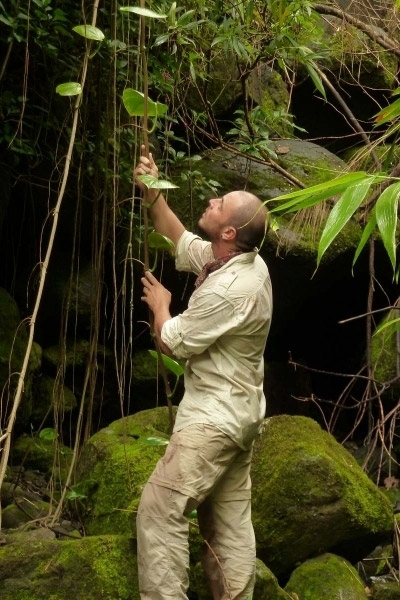
Ignacio Solano, developer of vertical ecosystems

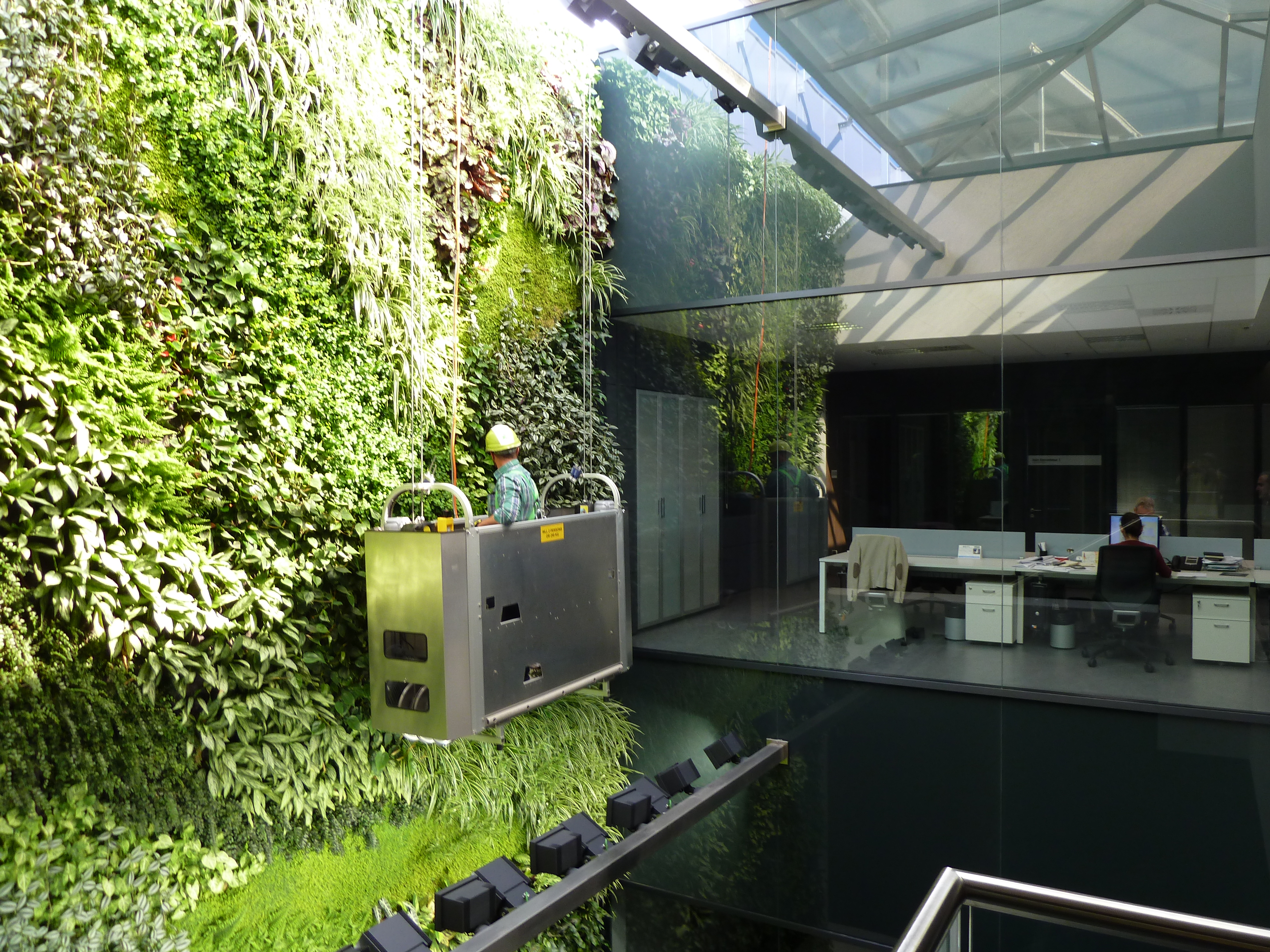
Example of vertical ecosystem, Spain

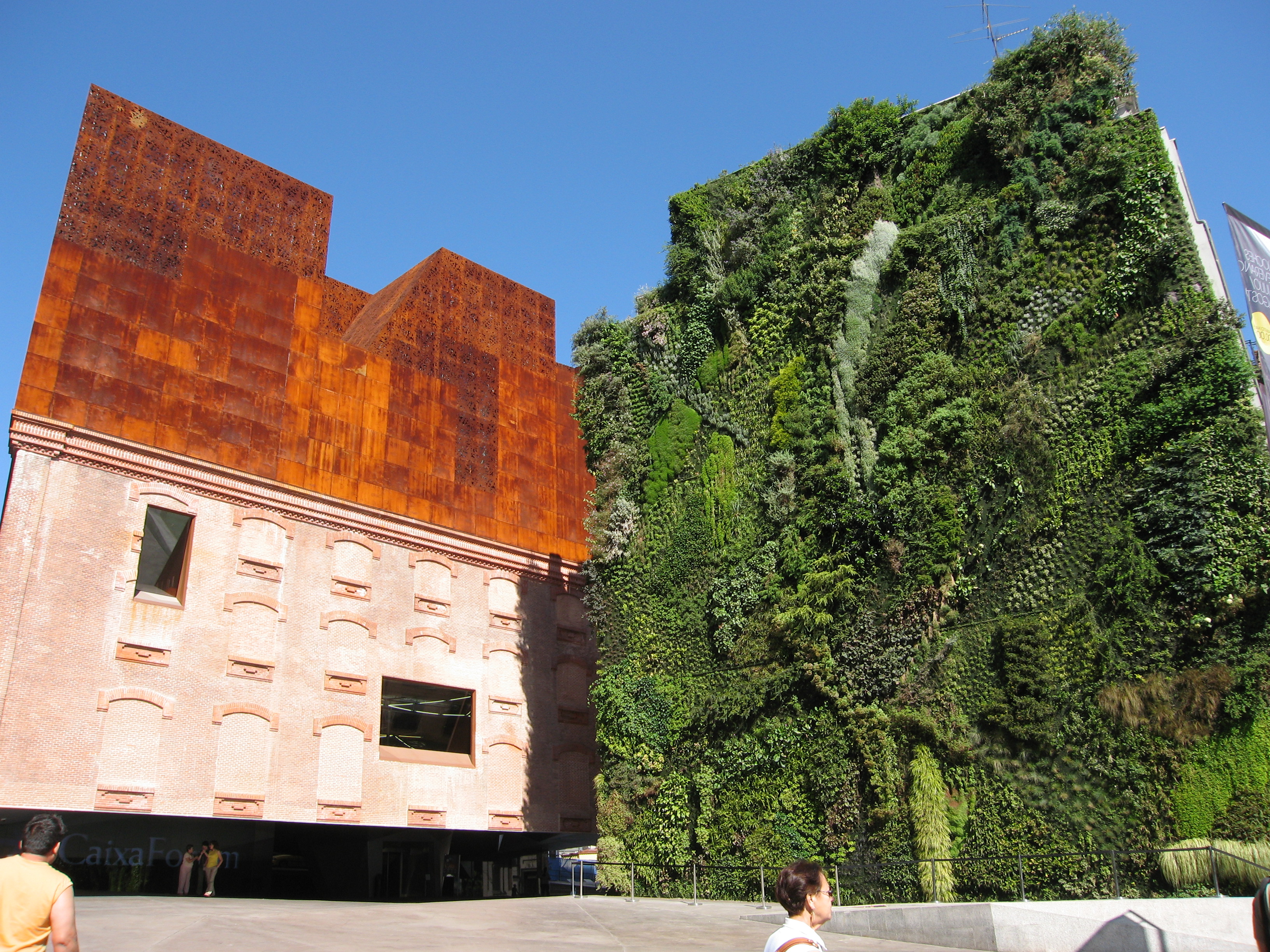
Vertical ecosystem, Caixa Forum Museum, Madrid, Spain. 15,000-17,000 plants depending on the season.

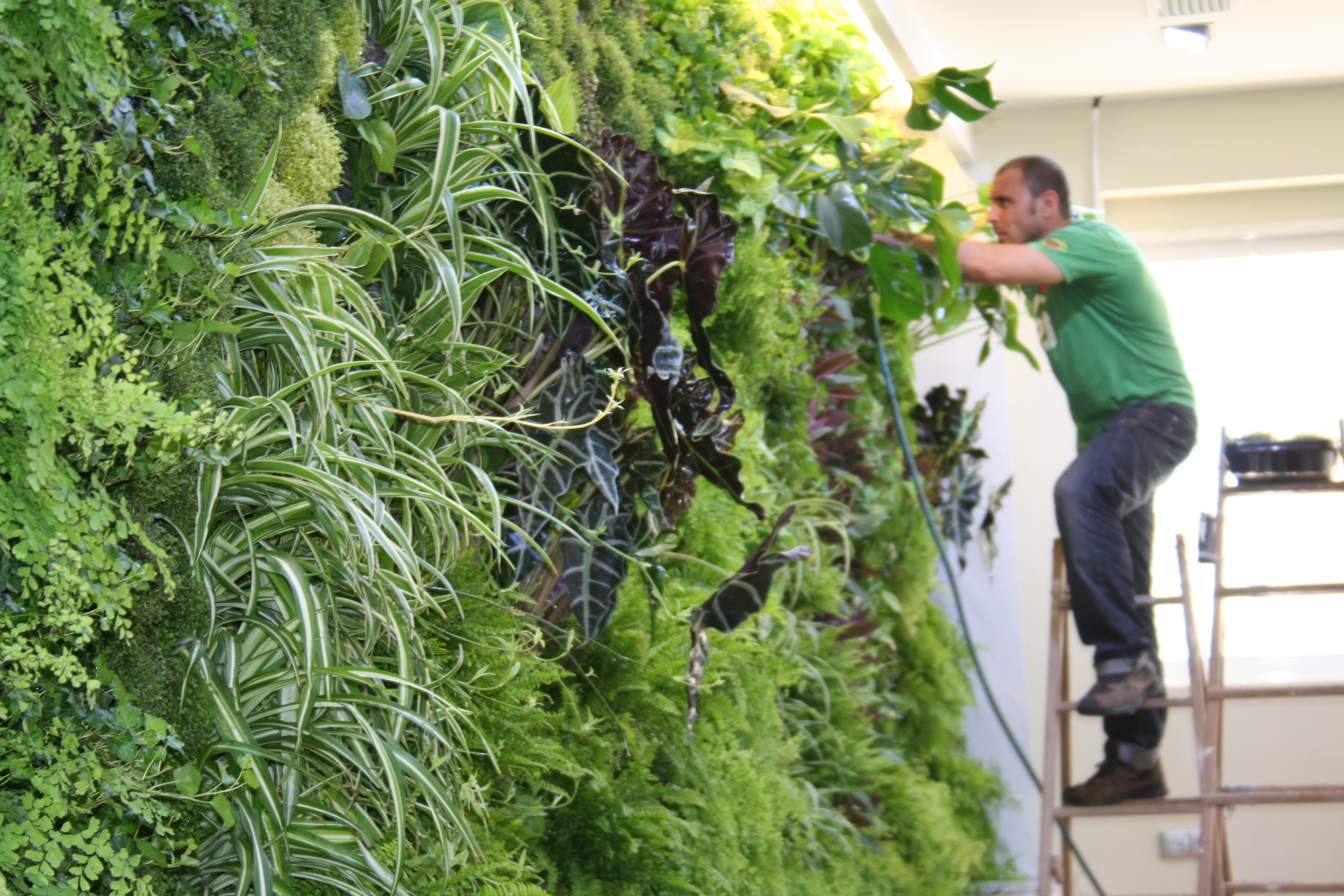
Detail of vertical ecosystem

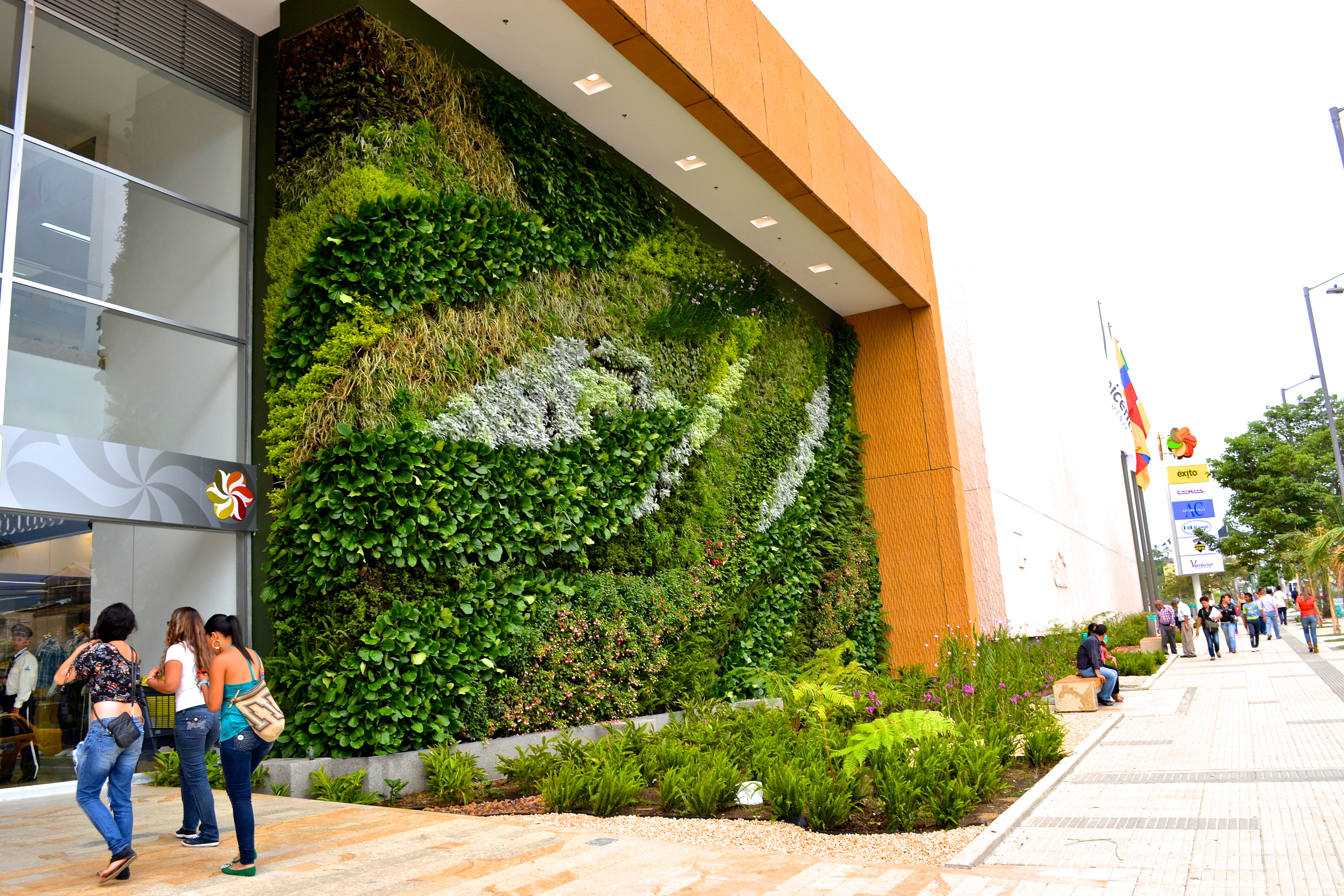
Another example of vertical ecosystem, Ecuador

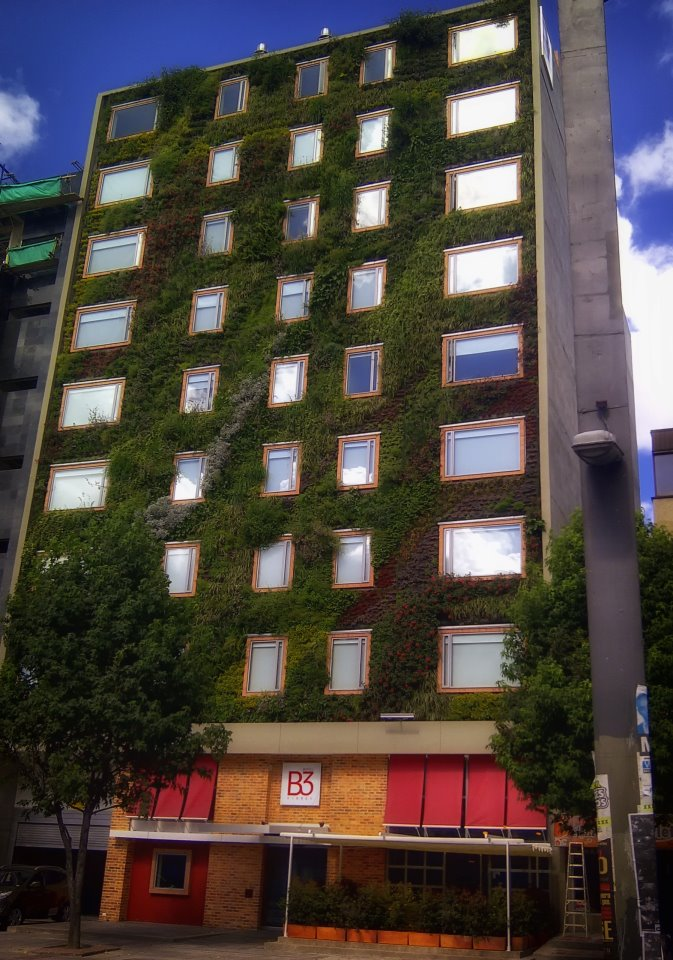
Hotel Gaia 3, Colombia, Bogotá. More than 25000 plants of 55 different species spread over 400 square metres of façade

A vertical ecosystem is an architectural gardening system developed by Ignacio Solano from the mur vegetal created by Patrick Blanc. This new approach enhances the previous archetype of mur vegetal and considers the relationship that exists between a set of living organisms, biocenosis, inhabiting a physical component, biotope. The system is based on the automated control of nutrients and plant parameters of the original wall, adding strains of bacteria, mycorrhiza fungi and interspecific symbiosis in plant selection, creating an artificial ecosystem from inert substrates. The system was created in 2007 and patented in 2010.

Amongst abiotic factors that influence vertical ecosystems, namely the substrate and its environmental conditions, the physio-chemical characteristics possessed by the means are decisive. The texture, porosity and depth of the substrate, those that in a natural ecosystem are edaphic factors, have been tested to the point of finding fitogenerate materials with perfect levels of absorption and humidity for the development of more than forty living families of plants represented by around 120 species. Moreover, the substrate used in the system developed by Ignacio Solano provides the ecosystem with the necessary resistance to serve as a high-durability biotope.

Environmental factors such as light, temperature and humidity are controlled by automated systems in interior vertical ecosystems. Ecosystems that are situated outside require study and analysis of the natural variables of their particular area, combined with a study of the behaviour of the numerous plant species in the biotope in each location. The selection and combination of species is one of the key factors for correct development. This is known as positive allelopathy.

Hydrological factors, such as pH levels, the conductivity of the water, dissolved gases and salinity, are balanced with precision so that the hydroponic system functions at its maximum capacity. The objective required by this system is to incorporate all the nutrients and micronutrients necessary for the health of the plants, and therefore the whole ecosystem, in a constant manner. To control these variables, the vertical ecosystem implements a system of sensors and warnings that inform of any anomalies in the measurements in real time, allowing remote monitoring and control of the system.

Vertical ecosystems enable plant species, fungi, and bacteria to live in an environment of almost unlimited resources, generating interactions favourable to the system. In this way, they encourage healthy and exponential growth in their evolutionary stages, until they manage to adjust to their maximum value, known as the load capacity: the optimum capacity of living species interacting without stress in a limited space in search of mutualisms and intraspecific associations that benefit all the species involved. The success of a vertical ecosystem depends on the control of abiotic and biotic factors that limit the growth of plant populations, the control of environmental resistance.

Vertical ecosystems aim to prolong the life of planted species and bring the benefits of a traditional vertical garden, including: absorption of CO_{2}, heavy metals and dust, natural thermal insulation, and reduction of noise pollution.

== Some of the works ==
- 2007 Vertical garden at Caixa Forum Museum, Madrid (Spain)
- 2007 Vertical garden in Restaurante Els Vents, Alicante (Spain)
- 2007 Cube/Vertical garden, Getafe (Spain)
- 2008 Penthouse vertical garden, Murcia (Spain)
- 2008 Vertical garden, Paterna, Valencia (Spain)
- 2009 Indoor vertical garden, Elche (Spain)
- 2010 Luxury villa vertical garden, Ibiza (Spain)
- 2011 Cheese bar vertical garden, Madrid (Spain)
- 2011 Hollbox office vertical garden, Alicante (Spain)
- 2012 Hotel B3-Gaia vertical garden, Bogotá (Colombia)
- 2012 Scala shopping centre vertical garden, Quito (Ecuador)
- 2012 Unicentro Armenia shopping centre vertical garden, Colombia (advising and use of patent)
- 2012 Biomax vertical garden, Colombia (advising and use of patent)
- 2012 Librería Panamericana vertical garden, Colombia (advising and use of patent)
- 2012 Hotel Cosmos vertical garden, Colombia (advising and use of patent)
- 2013 Confederación de Empresarios Privados de Cochabamba vertical garden, Bolivia (advising and use of patent)
- 2013 Índalo banquet suite vertical garden, Alicante (Spain)
- 2013 Vertical garden, Murcia (Spain)
- 2013 Hotel Son Claret vertical garden, Mallorca (Spain)
- 2014 Vertical gardens in the Celebra Building of Montevideo (Uruguay) - (advising and use of patent)
- 2014 Vertical garden and green roof in the center of Elche (Spain)
- 2014 Vertical gardens in the Smart Building of Alhaurín de la Torre, Málaga (Spain)
- 2015 Vertical garden in Desguaces Otoniel, Alicante (Spain)
