= Jason F. McLennan =

- Born: Sudbury, Ontario
- Known for: Creator of the Living Building Challenge
- Spouse: Tracy McLennan
- Children: Julian, Declan, Aidan and Rowan
- Website: http://mclennan-design.com/

Jason F. McLennan (born 1973) is a Canadian-American architect, and a prominent figure in the green building movement. He is the founder, former chair, and current board member of the International Living Future Institute and Cascadia Green Building Council, a chapter of both the United States Green Building Council and the Canada Green Building Council. He is the CEO of McLennan Design, his own architecture and planning firm that does work all over the world. McLennan is also the creator of Pharos, an advanced building material rating system, Declare, an ingredient disclosure label for building products, and Just, a social justice transparency platform for organizations. In addition, he developed the Living Community Challenge and Living Product Challenge. Additionally, McLennan formerly served as the chief innovation officer for Integral Group.

In 2022, McLennan joined Perkins&Will as its first chief sustainability officer. He merged his company, McLennan Design, with Perkins&Will and became its managing director. McLennan Design located on Bainbridge Island, Wash. is Perkins&Will's 28th studio.

== The Living Building Challenge ==
McLennan created the Living Building Challenge, a sustainable design performance standard, while he was a principal with BNIM Architects. He transferred the intellectual property for the Challenge to Cascadia Green Building Council when he became that organization's CEO in 2006, and formally launched the program in November of that year.

== Awards and honors ==
He is a member of the Clinton Global Initiative, and in 2011, he was named one of Yes! Magazine's Breakthrough 15.

In 2012, McLennan's Living Building Challenge was the recipient of the 2012 Buckminster Fuller Challenge Award. McLennan was named an Ashoka Fellow in 2012 for "creating incentives and new practices so that the built environment improves health, well-being while increasing our access to a diverse and productive natural world." In 2012, he was also appointed to join Deepak Chopra, Dick Gephardt, Mel Matinez and Terry McAuliffe on the advisory board of Delos, a wellness real estate development firm founded by Paul Scialla.

In 2013, McLennan was recognized by GreenBiz.com with the VERGE 25 Worldchanger Award.

In April 2016, McLennan received the Award of Excellence from Engineering News-Record magazine. McLennan's residence, Heron Hall, was named “home of the month worldwide" by Architectural Record in 2017.

McLennan is a frequent speaker at green building and sustainability conferences and has presented at events including: Bioneers, Greenbuild and the Australian Green Building Conference. He was a keynote speaker at Verdical Group's annual Net Zero Conference in 2018 and won their Trailblazer Award in 2020.

On November 2, 2024 Laurentian University will name McLennan as honorary doctorate.

== Books ==
McLennan is the author of seven books:

- The Dumb Architect's Guide to Glazing Selection (2004)
- The Philosophy of Sustainable Design (2004)
- The Ecological Engineer (2006)
- Zugunruhe: The Inner Migration To Profound Environmental Change (2010)
- Transformational Thought (2012)
- Transformational Thought II (2016)
- LOVE+GREEN BUILDING: You and Me and the Beautiful Planet (2020)

== Personal life ==
Jason F. McLennan is married to artist Tracy McLennan and has four children, Julian, Declan, Aidan and Rowan.

McLennan and his family live in a specially-designed house called "Heron Hall", which is located on Bainbridge Island, Washington.
