= Positive Development =

'Net positive', from Positive Development (PD) theory, is a paradigm in sustainable development and design. PD theory (taught and published from 2003) was first detailed in Positive Development (2008), and detailed in Net-Positive Design (2020). A net positive system/structure would 'give back to nature and society more than it takes' over its life cycle. In contrast, conventional sustainable design and development, in the real-world context of excess population growth, biodiversity loss, cumulative pollution, wealth disparities and social inequities closes off future options. To reverse the overshoot of planetary boundaries, a 'positive Development' would, among other sustainability criteria, increase nature beyond pre-urban or pre-industrial conditions.

== Net positive sustainability ==
According to PD, the original precepts of sustainability (nature preservation and equity among current/future generations) require increasing future options. This, in turn, requires that development increase the social and natural life support systems. Green design always aimed for ecological restoration, social regeneration and economic revitalization. However, these essentially only 'add value' relative to current sites, buildings or practices. Green buildings are generally assessed as 'sustainable' if they improve upon best practices. They do not yet aim to increase nature, environmental security or justice in absolute (global) terms. Positive Development, in contrast, is defined as structures that increase universal life quality and future options by expanding the 'ecological base' (ecosystems, ecological carrying capacity, biodiversity) and the 'public estate' (universal access to means of survival/well-being and social capital). Sustainable design does not yet aim to increase overall natural and social life support systems and generally limits its focus to the health and environmental quality within the project's system boundaries. The mainstream perspective is probably because it is assumed that this is not possible. To address this, a PD website provides examples of how the built environment can address 30 crucial sustainability issues.

== Terminology ==
The term net positive is increasingly used by green designers, developers and businesses. However, they often apply it from a different perspective: 'giving back more good than bad'. That is, relative to current conditions, not to sustainability. In effect, this mean optimizing material resources, energy and stakeholder benefits, etc., or efficiency, not an overall (global) gain. This 'reductionist' approach was the aim of 20th-century green building design. PD emphasized the need for development to be net nature positive, since nature had been largely ignored in sustainable or regenerative design until recently.

A key feature that distinguishes the term net positive in PD from misinterpretations of the original usage is that PD separates nature restoration from nature net positive. This is because reductions in negative impacts are not net gains. Calling buildings net positive if they have more positive than negative impacts is a basic misunderstanding of PD accounting. Often, in conventional building assessment, reductions in negative impacts are sometimes called 'positive', many kinds of negative impacts are omitted, and negative impacts as judged to be somehow erased by adding positive impacts. The word 'net' in sustainability assessment necessarily means net in a whole-system sense. In PD, 'net' means public benefits beyond neutral impacts - not just reductions in the total negative impacts to zero by, for example, counting offsets or making tradeoffs.

== Theory origins ==
PD theory built on eco-philosophies that emerged in the 1980s. Calling for social transformation, they deconstructed the hierarchical cultures, dualistic thought patterns and linear-reductionist analyses of modernity. PD added a positive/negative overlay to explain why these theories did not contemplate increasing nature to offset consumption. Later, sustainability was absorbed into the dominant paradigm (DP) which assumed that current institutions could resolve the problems they fostered. According to PD, existing institutional and physical structures reduce future options and are thus terminal. The hypothesis was that, by converting negative systems into positive ones, genuinely sustainable planning, decision and design frameworks would materialize.

=== Design-decision distinction ===
The distinction between decision-making and design is central to PD. Decision-making processes/tools divide, compare and choose. They use bounded or 'closed system' thinking which excludes considerations that are difficult to quantify. Essentially, decision methods simplify issues and options to facilitate finding the best path from the present position or desired future. Back-casting and scenario planning, while powerful tools, presume the future can be predicted and selected. Such methods decide now how future citizens must live. They also reduce future options by narrowing resources, adaptability, space and biodiversity over time.

=== Decision-making ===
The reduction of the ecological base and public estate continues, PD argues, because new sustainability goals were spliced onto the old (anti-ecological) closed system models, methods and metrics of the DP. Given escalating human consumption, even global depopulation and ecological regeneration would not counterbalance total negative resource flows and ecological impacts. PD maintains that closed system models created and institutionalized zero-sum decision and measurement frameworks such as cost-benefit/risk-benefit analyses. It identifies and 'reverses' over a hundred systemic biases in governance, planning, decision and design frameworks by converting them into open system and design-based frameworks to facilitate eco-positive planning and design.

Whereas the internal logic of decision frameworks tend to diminish ecosystems and land eco-productivity, eco-logical design (creating) can multiply functions and public benefits synergistically. Eco-positive design involves open systems thinking (i.e. with transparent/permeable boundaries). For example, building rating tools are based on limits or thresholds (borders) and do not contemplate net public gains. Perhaps because of the deeply-embedded historic elevation of rationalist decision-making over design, green building design templates and rating tools are decision-based. Being reductionist, they encourage tradeoffs between costs and benefits or nature and society in physical development. Hence, they tend to reduce adaptability, diversity and reversibility.

== Governance ==
Decision systems in governance (i.e., legislative, executive and judicial) resolve conflict by allocating rights and resources—not by increasing the ecological base and/or public estate. Hence PD suggests different frameworks for environmental governance. These include a modified constitution with a new decision sphere to deal with the unique ethical dimensions of biophysical development, planning and design. Given real-world political barriers to change, PD also suggests default strategies to enable incremental reform by changing institutions from within. PD contends that gaps can be avoided in new governance and planning systems by simply reversing each ecologically terminal convention into eco-positive ones.

== Design and planning ==
While improved systems of governance, decision-making and planning can assist, biophysical sustainability is ultimately a design problem. To compensate for past system design errors, fundamental reforms of design methods and processes are required. PD proposes means to reduce material flows without tradeoffs by, for example, creating mutual gains and 'low-impact luxury' environments. PD contends that eco-positive design is already possible, partly through the integration of natural systems with building structures, spaces and surfaces (e.g. 'living machines', mycology, or 'algaetecture'). PD contributes other design concepts (e.g. 'design for eco-services', 'green scaffolding' 'green space walls', 'solar core' and 'piggyback roof, or 'playgardens').Digital sustainability can stimulate empirical advances in entrepreneurship, innovation and strategy and has the potential to have a positive impact on society.

SMARTmode (systems mapping and redesign thinking) is a PD planning process that includes two dozen environment gap analyses to highlight sustainability issues that are almost never assessed in planning or design. Some of these are forensic 'flows analyses' that identify (local/regional) social and ecological deficits that developments could ameliorate by design. They can be undertaken scientifically using emerging multi-dimensional digital mapping tools, more pragmatically by design teams, or more subjectively in community 'charrettes' (aka working bees) for workshopping planning criteria and design briefs. Until planners perform these analyses routinely, therefore, they can serve as design thinking exercises, guidelines and/or criteria.

Eco-positive retrofitting is a priority PD strategy. Due to the massive ongoing impacts of buildings, biophysical sustainability is impossible without retrofitting cities. Replacing buildings with greener ones costs too much in materials, money, energy and time, as new buildings represent only 1–3% of the building stock.

=== Eco-services design ===
The term 'ecosystem services' generally applies only to human benefits, which are usually valued by units (e.g. money, carbon or energy. PD uses the term 'eco-services' to include not only nature's instrumental (pragmatic) values like ecosystem goods and services, but its intrinsic (priceless) and 'biophilic' values. PD considers the value of nature to be 'infinite' as it is not only the basis of the economy, but essential to human existence itself. To counteract the ecological footprint of existing development, 'surplus' natural and social capital—assessed from fixed biophysical baselines—must be created both off-site and on-site by design.

=== Carbon-neutral design ===
Net positive energy is barred by the laws of physics. Calculations of 'net energy' seldom include the embodied energy and the ecological impacts incurred during resource extraction, production and transportation. A case study showed that a building sequestering more carbon than it emits over its life cycle with building-integrated vegetation using PD design principles is possible within under twelve years.

=== Design reporting ===
The PD eco-positive design reporting process (EDR) aims to avoid many shortcomings of decision-based approaches to design. In contrast to green building rating tools, the EDR aims to uncover opportunities to create net public gains. Design teams answer questions based on PD design criteria and SMARTmode analyses. This forces education, collaboration and 'frontloading' design (i.e. investing more in preliminary design stages). Exposing the research and reasoning behind decision and design concepts facilitates input from community, assessors and independent experts, and should therefore occur be undertaken in development project.

=== Assessment ===
Most rating tools prioritize resource efficiency and treat 'reductions in negative impacts' as if positive. Their baselines and benchmarks preclude net-positive impacts. Some provisions consider respective rights/responsibilities, but not broader ethical issues like improving human-nature relationships, reducing total resource flows or increasing social capital in the vicinity. Also, innovation is often valued for its own sake, not outcomes, and eco-efficiency saves owners money anyway. PD's 'hierarchy of eco-innovation' analysis instead prioritizes positive system-wide outcomes and net public benefits. Being non-numerical, it allows self-assessment during design when scientific data is unavailable, time and ego has vested or irreversible decisions are made.

==== PD Starfish ====
The PD Starfish design and rating tool enables quantification while assisting designers to consider more dimensions of sustainability. It is a modified radar diagram with added layers and satellite diagrams. Since most life-cycle assessment tools estimate impacts between '-1' (bad) to '0' (best) or zero impact, eco-positive public benefits are excluded. Unlike rating tools, benchmarks for different sustainability factors are based on fixed biophysical conditions—not typical buildings, sites or practices. The starfish uses one scale to assess impacts in relation to fixed benchmarks (from '-1' to '+1') and a linear scale on another layer for scoring/comparison purposes.
