= Regenerative city =

A regenerative city is an urban development built on an environmentally enhancing, restorative relationship with the natural systems from which the city draws resources for its sustenance. A regenerative city maintains a symbiotic, mutually beneficial relationship with its surrounding hinterland not only by minimizing its environmental impact but by actively improving and regenerating the productive capacity of the ecosystems from which it depends.

The concept of a Regenerative City was first developed by an International Expert Commission on Cities and Climate Change convened by the World Future Council jointly with Hamburg University for Architecture and Urban Development (HCU) between 2008 and 2011. The Commission consisted of urban planning experts, climate scientists, representatives of the United Nations, politicians and the private sector. The concept was first presented through the report "Regenerative Cities" in 2010 and further expanded in various subsequent reports as well as in the book titled "Creating Regenerative Cities" by Herbert Girardet. Since 2011 the concept was also recurrently discussed during the annual Future of Cities Forum.

The regenerative city is also included in the principles for the New Urban Paradigm as outlined in The City We Need document compiled by the UN-Habitat advocacy and partnership platform the World Urban Campaign. The City We Need, whose aim is to set key principles and establish essential paths for building a New Urban Agenda towards the Habitat III conference, states that "the city we need is a regenerative city".

Examples of cities committing to the regenerative city concept include the city of Wittenberg in Germany which declared its intention to become a regenerative city in 2013. Similarly, Iowa City in the U.S. launched the Regenerative City Initiative in 2014, consisting of various projects and strategies to transform the city into a regenerative city.

== Going beyond urban sustainability ==
At the core of the regenerative city concept lies the understanding that it is essential to go beyond a restrictive definition of sustainability and embrace a broader model of urban development that puts the emphasis on the need for cities not to only to sustain but to actively regenerate the natural resources they need and absorb. While the original definition of sustainable development states that "sustainable development is a development that meets the needs of the present without compromising the ability of future generations to meet their own needs" regenerative urban development recognizes that considering the speed and scale of current resource consumption, the ability of future generations to meet their own needs is many times already compromised. For example, in 2013, by August consumption worldwide had already overshot the earth's annual natural production. For the rest of the year humanity was incurring resource debt. Therefore, in light of the problems related to resource consumption and overshoot, regenerative cities strive not only to stop consuming natural resources at a rate which is faster than ecosystems can recover, but reverse the trend by actively improving the regenerative capacity of ecosystems they rely on.

== Linear resource flows in an urbanising world ==
Currently most cities are heavily dependent on resources which are consumed and wasted with little consideration to their origin or their final destination. Input resources such as water, food, energy and goods are imported from well beyond the cities´ boundaries to be consumed by city dwellers and discarded in the form of waste and pollution to air, water and land. In order to meet the increasingly high level of energy demand, cities import and burn fossil fuels whose output pollutes the air and increases the level of greenhouse gases which cause climate change. Raw materials are continuously extracted to meet an ever increasing consumer demand and very often exit the consumption chain in the form of waste to landfill that cannot be reabsorbed by nature. Nutrients and carbon are removed from farmland as food is harvested, processed and eaten and the resulting waste is discharged into rivers and coastal waters downstream from population centres and usually not returned to farmland. Rivers and oceans become increasingly contaminated by sewage, toxic effluents and mineral run-offs. This deleterious relationship in which cities are unable to interact in a mutually beneficial way with the ecosystems on which they depend is putting at risk the long-term viability of urbanization. Regenerative urban development is based on the understanding that if urban areas are to continue to offer individuals around the world the prospect of an improved quality of life and ability to realise their potential and aspirations, they must embrace their role in ensuring that the earth's life support systems remain healthy and sound. This can be achieved by adopting a model of urban development which enables cities to interact symbiotically with their surrounding environment and actively improve the degraded conditions of their supporting ecosystems.

== The regenerative vision ==
First of all, the development of a regenerative city requires a switch in paradigm away from the old linear metabolism – which allows cities to operate within an isolated segment of the resource cycle – to a new circular metabolism. Regenerative urban development seeks to mimic the circular metabolic systems found in nature where all waste becomes organic nutrients for new growth. In regenerative cities priority is given to closing the urban resource cycle, which means finding value in outputs that are conventionally regarded as waste and using them as resource inputs in local and regional production systems.

For example, a regenerative city reintroduces treated water into the hydrology cycle, sources food from urban and peri-urban producers, captures the nutrients from its sewage and waste to be applied to surrounding agricultural land, reduces its dependence on petroleum products and boosts the deployment of renewable energies particularly from local sources. Closing resource loops in this way is the first fundamental step toward regenerative development.

The second step is to actively work to regenerate the materials and resources the city uses, making the regenerative city a node of production. This can be aided by developing ecosystem service infrastructure within the urban area which improves the self-sufficiency of cities and their ability to meet their own demand for energy, food, water and goods from resource within the city's boundaries or from the surrounding areas. While many cities, especially megacities and those located in resource-poor regions, may not be able to meet all their needs within their own borders, they can employ a concept of subsidiarity: to seek opportunities to optimise urban and peri-urban production as much as possible before relying on the surrounding region, only after which they would look further afield. This renewed, enhanced relationship between cities and their hinterland and between urban and rural areas is a key aspect of regenerative cities. More recently, some authors have argued that a truly regenerative city is the one that completely offsets its environmental impact by restoring the damaged ecosystems in its region to the extent that its overall land, carbon, water, etc footprints are positive. This radical approach has been proposed for Nusantara, the new capital city of Indonesia, under construction in Borneo/Kalimantan.

== The fundamental processes for implementation ==
Beyond ensuring the long-term environmental sustainability of urbanization, implementing the regenerative city also means creating opportunities for local economic growth, enhanced liveability and well-being, better public spaces, improved social equality and cohesion, greater democratic participation, and stronger urban resilience. The implementation of regenerative cities is enabled by adopting a series of processes and policy solutions that create cites which are dynamic centres of democracy, public engagement, human development, innovation, urban regeneration, well-being, justice and equality. The key processes and recommendations to pave the way towards the regenerative city include:

1. Vision, leadership and long-term target setting
2. Citizen participation and democracy
3. Multi-stakeholder engagement and cross sectoral cooperation
4. Multi-level governance and vertical coordination
5. Enhanced targets and indicators
6. Communication, education and behavioural change
7. Improved research and connection to policy-making
